= Honor cords =

Token consisting of twisted cords with tassels

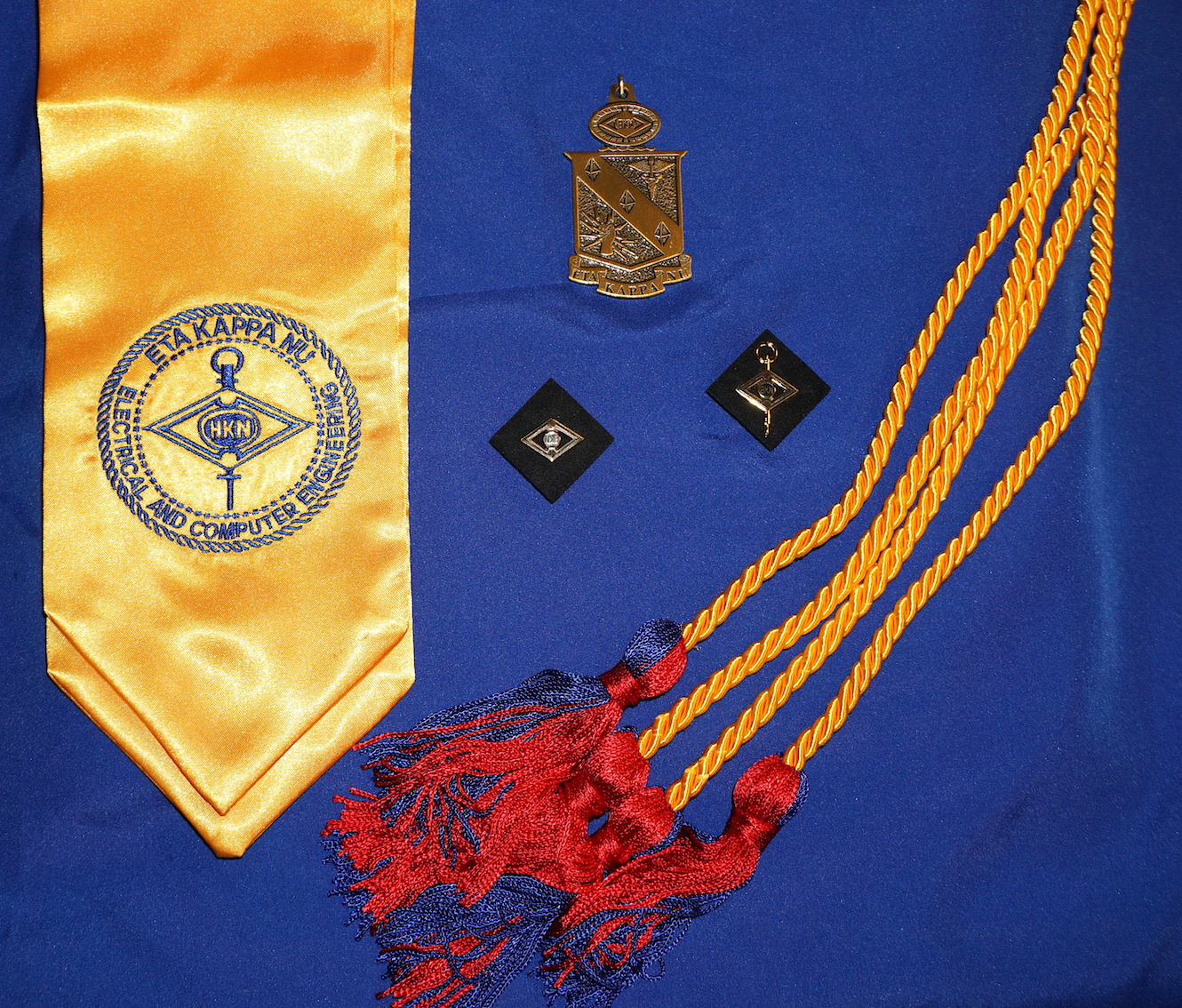
From left to right: Eta Kappa Nu stole, pins, and honor cords for inductions, graduations, and membership.

An honor cord is a token consisting of twisted cords with tassels on either end awarded to members of honor societies or for various academic and non-academic achievements, awards, or honors. Usually, cords come in pairs with a knot in the middle to hold them together. Sometimes sashes, stoles, or medallions are given in place of cords. They are most often worn at academic ceremonies and functions. With cap and gown, and (sometimes) the hood, high school or university degree candidates have worn these cords at the discretion of the educational institution, but they are not usually worn with academic regalia after the academic year in which the honor was awarded. Unlike hoods and stoles, by tradition more than one cord may be worn at the same time.

At some universities, pairs of honor cords, in the school colors, indicate honors graduates: one pair for cum laude, two pairs for magna cum laude, and three pairs for summa cum laude. These are in addition to any cords for membership in an honor society.

== Collegiate honor society honor cords ==
Following is a list of honor society and the colors of their related honor cords, stoles, and medallions.

Honor society	Honor cord colors	Stole colors	Medallion colors
Alpha Alpha Alpha	Blue and Grey/Silver		
Alpha Beta Gamma		Sapphire Blue (Adviser, Gold)	
Alpha Chi	Emerald Green and Sapphire Blue		
Alpha Epsilon	Honor Gold or Blue and Green		
Alpha Epsilon Delta	Red and Violet		
Alpha Epsilon Lambda	Scarlet and Grey		
Alpha Gamma Sigma	Double Gold Cord		
Alpha Kappa Delta	Teal		
Alpha Kappa Mu	Royal Blue and White		
Alpha Lambda Delta	Red, Gold, and White		
Alpha Mu Alpha	Red		
Alpha Mu Gamma	Gold		
Alpha Nu Sigma	White		
Alpha Phi Omega	Royal Blue and Old Glory Gold		
Alpha Phi Sigma	Royal blue and Gold	Gold	Blue
Alpha Pi Mu	White and Gold		
Alpha Psi Omega	Light Blue and Amber		
Alpha Sigma Lambda	Maroon/Burgundy and Gold		
Alpha Sigma Nu			Gold on Maroon Ribbon
American Mock Trial Association	Maroon, Purple and Royal Blue		
Beta Alpha Psi	Red	White	
Beta Beta Beta	Forest Green and Blood Red		
Beta Gamma Sigma	Blue and Gold		
Beta Kappa Chi	Royal Blue		
Beta Phi Mu	Purple and White		
Chi Alpha Sigma	Gold and Black		
Chi Epsilon		Purple and White	
Chi Sigma Iota	Blue and White		
Delta Epsilon Iota	Royal Blue and Old Gold		
Delta Epsilon Sigma	Gold and Maroon		
Delta Mu Delta	Purple and Gold		
Delta Phi Alpha	Black, Red and Gold		
Delta Omicron	Pink and Grey		
Delta Sigma Rho-Tau Kappa Alpha			
Delta Tau Alpha	Hunter Green and Harvest Gold		
Dobro Slovo	Black and Gold		
Epsilon Pi Tau	Blue, White and Gold		
Eta Kappa Nu	Gold Cord with Navy Blue, and Scarlet Red Tassels		
Eta Sigma Delta	Blue and White		
Eta Sigma Phi	Gold and Purple	Gold	
Gamma Sigma Alpha	Cardinal Red and God		
Gamma Sigma Epsilon	Blue and White		
Gamma Theta Upsilon	Brown, Light Blue, and Gold		
Golden Key International Honour Society	Royal Blue and Gold		
Iota Iota Iota	Lavender (purple)		
Iota Tau Alpha	Red, Yellow, and Royal Blue		
Kappa Alpha Omicron	Forest Green		
Kappa Beta Delta	Blue and Gold		
Kappa Delta Pi	Purple and Jade Green		
Kappa Kappa Psi	Blue and White		
Kappa Mu Epsilon	Pink and Gray		
Kappa Omicron Nu	Burgundy and Cream		Gold/Burgundy with Burgundy Ribbon
Kappa Tau Alpha	Light Blue and Gold		
Lambda Alpha	White, Black, Green, and Red		
Lambda Epsilon Chi		Purple	
Lambda Iota Tau	Purple and Gold		
Lambda Pi Eta	Red, White, and Gold		
Lambda Sigma	Blue and Gold		
Mortar Board	Silver and Gold		
Mu Kappa Tau	Blue and Gold		
National Residence Hall Honorary	Blue and White		
National Society of Collegiate Scholars	Burgundy and Gold		
Nu Lambda Mu	Gold and Green		
Nu Rho Psi	Black and Gold		
Omega Chi Epsilon	Maroon and White		
Omicron Delta Epsilon	Royal Blue and Gold		
Omicron Delta Kappa	Light Blue, White, and Black		
Omega Nu Lambda	Navy and Gray		
Omega Rho	Blue and Red		
Omicron Delta Epsilon	Blue and Gold		
Omicron Delta Kappa	Sky Blue, White, and Black		
Order of Omega	Gold and Ivory		
Phi Alpha Honor Society	Royal Blue and Gold		
Phi Alpha Theta	Madonna Red and Madonna Blue (sky blue)		
Phi Beta Delta	Red and Gold		
Phi Beta Kappa	Pink and Sky Blue		
Phi Delta Phi	Red, Blue, and Gold		
Phi Epsilon Kappa	Black and Gold		
Phi Eta Sigma	Gold and Black		
Phi Kappa Phi	Navy and Gold	Gold with Royal Blue Ribbon	
Phi Lambda Upsilon	Blue, Pink		
Phi Sigma	Yellow, Green, and White		
Phi Sigma Iota	Gold		
Phi Sigma Tau	White and Purple		
Phi Sigma Theta	Gold, Green and Purple		
Phi Theta Kappa	Blue and Gold	Gold	Gold
Phi Upsilon Omicron	Yellow, White, and Purple		
Pi Alpha Alpha	Light Blue and Gold		
Pi Alpha Xi	Cerulean Blue and Nile Green		
Pi Delta Phi	Blue, White, and Red		
Pi Gamma Mu	Royal Blue and White		
Pi Kappa Lambda	Gold and White		
Pi Mu Epsilon	Gold and Purple		
Pi Omega Pi	Silver, Royal Blue, and Gold		
Pi Sigma Alpha	Red, White, and Black		
Pi Tau Sigma	Red and Blue		
Pi Theta Epsilon	Navy and Gold		
Psi Beta	Royal Blue and Gold		
Psi Chi	Platinum and Dark Blue		
Rho Chi	Royal Purple and White		
Rho Lambda	Maroon and Gold		
S.A.L.U.T.E.	Red/Cardinal, White, and Royal Blue		
Sigma Alpha Lambda	Navy, Black, and Gold		
Sigma Alpha Pi	Platinum and Black		
Sigma Beta Delta	Hunter Green and Gold		
Sigma Delta Pi	Red and Gold		
Sigma Lambda Alpha	Gold and Green		
Sigma Lambda Chi	Green and Gold	Silver Logo	
Sigma Pi Sigma	Forest Green and Ivory		
Sigma Tau Delta	Cardinal Red and Black		
Sigma Theta Tau	Orchid and White		
Sigma Xi	Silver and Blue		
Tau Alpha Pi	Green and Gold		
Tau Beta Pi	Orange and White	White with Orange Bent	
Tau Beta Sigma	White and Blue		
Tau Sigma	Red and Gold		
Theta Alpha Kappa	Scarlet		
Thompson Scholars	Black and Royal Blue		
Upsilon Phi Delta	Red and Blue		
Upsilon Pi Epsilon	Maroon and White		

== High school honor society honor cords ==
Honor society	Color
National Honor Society	Blue and Gold
National Technical Honor Society	Purple and White
Computer Science Honor Society	Light Blue
National English Honor Society	Blue and Gold
National Art Honor Society	Red, Orange, Yellow, Green, Blue, and Purple
Société Honoraire de Français	Red, White, and Blue
German National Honor Society	Black, Red and Gold
Japanese National Honor Society	Red and White
National Junior Classical League Latin Honor Society	Purple and Gold
Mu Alpha Theta	Light Blue and Gold
Tri-M Music Honor Society	Pink
National Business Honor Society	Hunter Green and Silver
Science National Honor Society	Green and Purple
Rho Kappa	Blue and White
The Duke of Edinburgh's Award	Gold, Silver, Bronze
Sociedad Honoraria Hispánica	Gold and Red
National Speech and Debate Association	Red and Grey
Technology Student Association	Red, Silver, and Blue
International Thespian Society	Blue and Gold, Brown
National Eagle Scout Association	Red, White, and Blue
Mensa Honor Society	Blue, White, and Black

== See also ==
- Association of College Honor Societies
- Honor Society Caucus
- Graduation pin
- Honor medal
