= List of Pi Omega Pi chapters =

Pi Omega Pi is an scholastic honor society for students in the field of business education. In the following list of chapters, active chapters are indicated in bold and inactive chapters are in italics.

Number	Chapter	Charter date and range	Institution	Location	Status	Ref.
1	Alpha	June 13, 1923	Northeast Missouri State University	Kirksville, Missouri	Inactive	
2	**Beta**	1924	Northwest Missouri State University	Maryville, Missouri	Active	
3	Gamma	1927	University of Northern Iowa	Cedar Falls, Iowa	Inactive	
4	Delta	1927	Peru State College	Peru, Nebraska	Inactive	
5	Epsilon	1927–1980	University of Iowa	Iowa City, Iowa	Inactive	
6	Zeta	1928	University of Northern Colorado	Greeley, Colorado	Inactive	
7	Eta	1928	North Texas State	Denton, Texas	Inactive	
8	**Theta**	1928	Illinois State University	Normal, Illinois	Active	
9	Iota	1929–1968	Northern State University	Aberdeen, South Dakota	Inactive	
10	**Kappa**	1929	Indiana University of Pennsylvania	Indiana, Pennsylvania	Active	
11	Lambda	1929	Fort Hays State University	Hays, Kansas	Inactive	
12	**Mu**	1929	Emporia State University	Emporia, Kansas	Active	
13	Nu	1929–1979	Kearney State College	Kearney, Nebraska	Inactive	
14	Xi	1929	Ball State University	Muncie, Indiana	Inactive	
15	Omicron	1930–1978	Pittsburg State University	Pittsburg, Kansas	Inactive	
16	**Pi**	1930	Valley City State University	Valley City, North Dakota	Active	
17	Rho	1930–1967	Northeastern State University	Tahlequah, Oklahoma	Inactive	
18	Sigma	1931	Southeastern State College	Durant, Oklahoma	Inactive	
19	Tau	1931–1977	Northern Arizona University	Flagstaff, Arizona	Inactive	
20	Upsilon	1931–1932	New Jersey State Teachers College and State Normal School at Trenton	Trenton, New Jersey	Inactive	
21	Phi	1932–1932	Sam Houston State Teachers College	Huntsville, Texas	Inactive	
22	**Chi**	1932	Indiana State University	Terre Haute, Indiana	Active	
23	**Psi**	1932	University of Wisconsin–Whitewater	Whitewater, Wisconsin	Active	
24	Omega	1933	Western Illinois State College	Macomb, Illinois	Inactive	
25	Alpha Alpha	1934–1978	San Jose State University	San Jose, California	Inactive	
26	**Alpha Beta**	1935	Eastern Kentucky University	Richmond, Kentucky	Active	
27	Alpha Gamma	1935	Mississippi Women's College	Hattiesburg, Mississippi	Inactive	
28	**Alpha Delta**	1935	Bloomsburg University of Pennsylvania	Bloomsburg, Pennsylvania	Active	
29	Alpha Epsilon	1936–1936	Mary Washington College	Fredericksburg, Virginia	Inactive	
30	Alpha Zeta	1937	Southwest Missouri State	Springfield, Missouri	Inactive	
31	Alpha Eta	1938–1970	Oklahoma State University–Stillwater	Stillwater, Oklahoma	Inactive	
32	Alpha Theta	1938	Chadron State College	Chadron, Nebraska	Inactive	
33	Alpha Iota	1938	Arizona State University	Tempe, Arizona	Inactive	
34	Alpha Kappa	1939	Arkansas State University	Jonesboro, Arkansas	Inactive	
35	Alpha Lambda	1939–1972	University of Oklahoma	Norman, Oklahoma	Inactive	
36	Alpha Mu	1939	University of Central Oklahoma	Edmond, Oklahoma	Inactive	
37	Alpha Nu	1939	Northwestern State University	Natchitoches, Louisiana	Inactive	
38	Alpha Xi	1939–1963	Ohio State University	Columbus, Ohio	Inactive	
39	Alpha Omicron	1939	St. Cloud State University	St. Cloud, Minnesota	Inactive	
40	**Alpha Pi**	1939	Mississippi State University	Mississippi State, Mississippi	Active	
41	**Alpha Rho**	1940	Wayne State College	Wayne, Nebraska	Active	
42	Alpha Sigma	1940	University of Southern Mississippi	Hattiesburg, Mississippi	Inactive	
43	Alpha Tau	1940–1961	University of Southern California	Los Angeles, California	Inactive	
45	Alpha Upsilon	1943–1972	Miami University	Oxford, Ohio	Inactive	
44	Alpha Phi	1940	Duquesne University	Pittsburgh, Pennsylvania	Inactive	
46	**Alpha Chi**	1940	Eastern Illinois University	Charleston, Illinois	Active	
	Alpha Psi	1941	Bowling Green State University	Bowling Green, Ohio	Inactive	
	Alpha Omega	1941–1970	Drexel University	Philadelphia, Pennsylvania	Inactive	
	Beta Alpha	1942	George Peabody College for Teachers	Nashville, Tennessee	Inactive	
	Beta Beta	1942–1968	University of Akron	Akron, Ohio	Inactive	
	Beta Gamma	1941–1963	University of Tennessee	Knoxville, Tennessee	Inactive	
	Beta Delta	1941–1964	New York University	New York City, New York	Inactive	
	Beta Epsilon	1942	Montana State University	Bozeman, Montana	Inactive	
	Beta Zeta	1941	Southern Illinois University Carbondale	Carbondale, Illinois	Inactive	
	Beta Eta	1942	University at Albany, SUNY	Albany, New York	Inactive	
	Beta Theta	1941–1968	New Mexico Highlands University	Las Vegas, New Mexico	Inactive	
	Beta Iota	1942–1963	Wayne State University	Detroit, Michigan	Inactive	
58	**Beta Kappa**	1944	East Carolina University	Greenville, North Carolina	Active	
59	**Beta Lambda**	1944	Shippensburg University of Pennsylvania	Shippensburg, Pennsylvania	Active	
60	Beta Mu	1945–1968	Tennessee Tech	Cookeville, Tennessee	Inactive	
61	Beta Nu	1945	James Madison University	Harrisonburg, Virginia	Inactive	
62	Beta Xi	1946–1968	Boston University	Boston, Massachusetts	Inactive	
63	Beta Omicron	1947	University of Arizona	Tucson, Arizona	Inactive	
64	Beta Pi	1948–1960	Concord College	Athens, West Virginia	Inactive	
65	Beta Rho	1948	University of Central Missouri	Warrensburg, Missouri	Inactive	
66	Beta Sigma	1948	Montclair State University	Montclair, New Jersey	Inactive	
67	Beta Tau	1945	East Texas State University	Commerce, Texas	Inactive	
68	Beta Upsilon	1949–1977	Central Missouri State University	Warrensburg, Missouri	Inactive	
69	Beta Phi	1949	Michigan State Normal School	Ypsilanti, Michigan	Inactive	
70	Beta Chi	1949–1971	San Diego State University	San Diego, California	Inactive	
71	Beta Psi	1950	Tennessee State University	Nashville, Tennessee	Inactive	
72	Beta Omega	1950–1956	Paterson State Teachers College	Wayne, New Jersey	Inactive	
73	Gamma Alpha	1950	Western Michigan University	Kalamazoo, Michigan	Inactive	
74	Gamma Beta	1950	West Liberty University	West Liberty, West Virginia	Inactive	
75	Gamma Gamma	1950–1976	Florida State University	Tallahassee, Florida	Inactive	
76	Gamma Delta	1950–1978	California State University, Chico	Chico, California	Inactive	
77	Gamma Epsilon	1951	University of North Dakota	Grand Forks, North Dakota	Inactive	
78	Gamma Zeta	1951–1962	Pennsylvania State University	State College, Pennsylvania	Inactive	
79	Gamma Eta	1951	Bluefield State University	Bluefield, West Virginia	Inactive	
80	Gamma Theta	1951	Lincoln Memorial University	Harrogate, Tennessee	Inactive	
81	Gamma Iota	1951–1982	University of South Dakota	Vermillion, South Dakota	Inactive	
82	Gamma Kappa	1951	Southwest Texas State University	San Marcos, Texas	Inactive	
83	Gamma Lambda	1951–1964	Virginia Tech	Blacksburg, Virginia	Inactive	
84	Gamma Mu	1952	Marshall University	Huntington, West Virginia	Inactive	
85	Gamma Nu	1952	Georgia State College for Women	Milledgeville, Georgia	Inactive	
86	Gamma Xi	1952	Texas Tech University	Lubbock, Texas	Inactive	
87	Gamma Omicron	1952	University of Central Arkansas	Conway, Arkansas	Inactive	
88	Gamma Pi	1953–1980	Kent State University	Kent, Ohio	Inactive	
89	Gamma Rho	1953–1976	Bethune–Cookman University	Daytona Beach, Florida	Inactive	
90	Gamma Sigma	1953–1971	California State University, Fresno	Fresno, California	Inactive	
91	Gamma Tau	1953–1961	University of California, Los Angeles	Los Angeles, California	Inactive	
92	Gamma Upsilon	1953	Murray State University	Murray, Kentucky	Inactive	
93	**Gamma Phi**	1954	North Carolina A&T State University	Greensboro, North Carolina	Active	
94	Gamma Chi	1954–1980	Middle Tennessee State University	Murfreesboro, Tennessee	Inactive	
95	Gamma Psi	1955–1973	Appalachian State University	Boone, North Carolina	Inactive	
96	Gamma Omega	1955	University of Texas at Austin	Austin, Texas	Inactive	
97	Delta Alpha	1956–1981	Salem University	Salem, West Virginia	Inactive	
98	Delta Beta	1956–1971	University of Miami	Coral Gables, Florida	Inactive	
99	Delta Gamma	1956–1970	California State University, Long Beach	Long Beach, California	Inactive	
100	Delta Delta	1957–1974	Michigan State University	East Lansing, Michigan	Inactive	
101	Delta Epsilon	1957	Northern Illinois University	DeKalb, Illinois	Inactive	
102	Delta Zeta	1957	Southeast Missouri State University	Cape Girardeau, Missouri	Inactive	
103	Delta Eta	1957–1970	University of Detroit Mercy	Detroit, Michigan	Inactive	
104	Delta Theta	1958–1960	University of Hawaiʻi	Manoa, Honolulu, Hawaii	Inactive	
105	Delta Iota	1958–1981	Georgia Southern University	Statesboro, Georgia	Inactive	
106	Delta Kappa	1959	West Texas State	Canyon, Texas	Inactive	
107	Delta Lambda	1959	Southern University and A&M College	Baton Rouge, Louisiana	Inactive	
108	Delta Mu	1960	Delta State University	Cleveland, Mississippi	Inactive	
109	Delta Nu	1960	Virginia State University	Ettrick, Virginia	Inactive	
110	Delta Xi	1960–1966	University of Kansas	Lawrence, Kansas	Inactive	
111	Delta Omicron	1960	California State University, Sacramento	Sacramento, California	Inactive	
112	Delta Pi	1961	Ferris State University	Big Rapids, Michigan	Inactive	
113	Delta Rho	1961	Longwood University	Farmville, Virginia	Inactive	
114	Delta Sigma	1961–1967	Baylor University	Waco, Texas	Inactive	
115	Delta Tau	1961–1972	Colorado State University	Fort Collins, Colorado	Inactive	
116	Delta Upsilon	1962–1976	Mississippi College	Clinton, Mississippi	Inactive	
117	Delta Phi	1963	University of Houston	Houston, Texas	Inactive	
118	Delta Chi	1963	Temple University	Philadelphia, Pennsylvania	Inactive	
119	Delta Psi	1965–1966	University of Mary Hardin–Baylor	Belton, Texas	Inactive	
120	**Delta Omega**	1964	Minot State University	Minot, North Dakota	Active	
121	Epsilon Alpha	1964–1976	Edgewood College	Madison, Wisconsin	Inactive	
122	Epsilon Beta	1966	Southern Illinois University Edwardsville	Edwardsville, Illinois	Inactive	
123	Epsilon Gamma	1966	Norfolk State University	Norfolk, Virginia	Inactive	
124	Epsilon Delta	1967	Northern Michigan University	Marquette, Michigan	Inactive	
125	Epsilon Epsilon	1968	Rider University	Lawrence Township, New Jersey	Inactive	
126	Epsilon Zeta	1968	Radford University	Radford, Virginia	Inactive	
127	Epsilon Eta	1970	Mankato State University	Mankato, Minnesota	Inactive	
128	Epsilon Theta	1970	Western Kentucky University	Bowling Green, Kentucky	Inactive	
129	Epsilon Iota	1971	Texas Southern University	Houston, Texas	Inactive	
130	Epsilon Kappa	1972	Moorhead State University	Moorhead, Minnesota	Inactive	
131	Epsilon Lambda	1973	Fayetteville State University	Fayetteville, North Carolina	Inactive	
132	Epsilon Mu	1973	Wichita State University	Wichita, Kansas	Inactive	
133	Epsilon Nu	1973	Bishop College	Marshall, Texas	Inactive	(Note: Bishop College closed in 1988.)
134	Epsilon Xi	1973	Jackson State University	Jackson, Mississippi	Inactive	
135	Epsilon Omicron	1973	Prairie View A&M University	Prairie View, Texas	Inactive	
136	Epsilon Pi	1974	Jarvis Christian University	Hawkins, Texas	Inactive	
137	Epsilon Rho	1974	Grambling State University	Grambling, Louisiana	Inactive	
138	Epsilon Sigma	1974	University of Wisconsin–Eau Claire	Eau Claire, Wisconsin	Inactive	
139	Epsilon Tau	1974	University of New Hampshire	Durham, New Hampshire	Inactive	
140	Epsilon Upsilon	1975–1976	Mississippi Valley State University	Mississippi Valley State, Mississippi	Inactive	
141	Epsilon Phi	1975	University of Texas–Pan American	Edinburg, Texas	Inactive	
142	Epsilon Chi	1976	Northeast Louisiana University	Monroe, Louisiana	Inactive	
143	Epsilon Psi	1976	Missouri Southern State University	Joplin, Missouri	Inactive	
144	Epsilon Omega	1977	Wiley University	Marshall, Texas	Inactive	
145	Zeta Alpha	1977	Florida A&M University	Tallahassee, Florida	Inactive	
146	Zeta Beta	1978–1979	University of Mississippi	Oxford, Mississippi	Inactive	
147	Zeta Gamma	1978	University of South Alabama	Mobile, Alabama	Inactive	
148	**Zeta Delta**	1978–19xx ?; 2010	Alabama State University	Montgomery, Alabama	Active	
149	Zeta Epsilon	1979	Central Michigan University	Mount Pleasant, Michigan	Inactive	
150	Zeta Zeta	1981	University of Alabama	Tuscaloosa, Alabama	Inactive	
151	Zeta Eta	1983	Kansas State University	Manhattan, Kansas	Inactive	
