= Alpha Delta Mu =

American social work honor society

- ΑΔΜ
- Founded: Fall 1976; 50 years ago Morgan State University
- Type: Honor
- Affiliation: Independent
- Former affiliation: ACHS
- Status: Active
- Emphasis: Social Work
- Scope: National
- Motto: "Advocate of the People"
- Colors: Black and Silver
- Publication: The Alpha Delta Mu Journal
- Chapters: 88
- Members: 10,000+ lifetime
- Headquarters: 1025 Connecticut Avenue NW, Suite 1000; Washington, D.C. 20036; United States

Alpha Delta Mu (ΑΔΜ) is an American social work honor society It was founded in 1976 at Morgan State University in Baltimore, Maryland. It has chartered more than ninety chapters across the United States. The society is a former member of the Association of College Honor Societies.

== History ==
Alpha Delta Mu was founded by Dr. J. Lawrence Feagins at Morgan State University in Baltimore, Maryland in the fall of 1976. Its purpose is to encourage scholarship in the field of social work and to advance the field. The society was incorporated in April 1977 in Maryland.

A second chapter, Beta, was chartered at the University of Wisconsin–Eau Claire in 1977. Alpha Delta Mu went on to add chapters at colleges and universities in the United States with social work programs.

Alpha Delta Mu was previously a member of the Association of College Honor Societies, joining in 1983 and becoming a full member in 1986. In 1991, the society had 88 active chapters and initiated 8,350 members. In 2004, it had sixty active chapters and had initiated 10,000 members.

== Symbols ==
The Alpha Delta Mu motto is "Advocate of the People". The society's colors are black and silver. Its members may wear an honor cord at graduation. Its publication is The Alpha Delta Mu Journal.

== Membership ==
To be eligible for membership, students must be a social work major who have completed six hours of courses in social work with a 3.0 GPA for undergraduate and a 3.5 GPA for graduate students. Colleges and universities with Alpha Delta Mu chapters must hold accreditation from regional and national organizations recognized by the Council for Higher Education Accreditation and must offer degrees at baccalaureate or higher levels in social work and maintain program accreditation from the Council on Social Work Education.

== Chapters ==
As of 1991 the society had 88 chapters. Following is an incomplete chapter list, with active chapters indicated in bold and inactive chapters and institutions indicated in italics.

Chapter	Charter date and range	Institution	Location	Status	Ref.
Alpha	1976	Morgan State University	Baltimore, Maryland		
Beta	1977	University of Wisconsin–Eau Claire	Eau Claire, Wisconsin		
	1977	University of South Dakota	Vermillion, South Dakota	Inactive	
**Epsilon**	May 1977	Misericordia University	Dallas, Pennsylvania	Active	
Zeta	1977	Norfolk State University	Norfolk, Virginia	Active	
Theta	May 12, 1977	East Carolina University	Greenville, North Carolina		
Iota	1978 ?	Tennessee State University	Nashville, Tennessee		
	1978 ?	Kean College	Union, New Jersey		
Rho	1978	North Carolina A&T State University	Greensboro, North Carolina		
Sigma	1979 ?	Murray State University	Murray, Kentucky		
Upsilon	1978 ?	University of Wisconsin–Milwaukee	Milwaukee, Wisconsin		
Chi	1978 ?	Southern University	Baton Rouge, Louisiana		
Psi	1978	University of Wisconsin–Oshkosh	Oshkosh, Wisconsin		
Alpha Beta	May 1978	Monmouth College	Monmouth, Illinois		
Alpha Gamma	1978 ?	University of Kentucky	Lexington, Kentucky		
**Alpha Epsilon**	1978	Ohio State University	Columbus, Ohio	Active	
Alpha Zeta	1978	University of Illinois Urbana-Champaign	Urbana, Illinois		
	before fall 1979	Southern Illinois University	Carbondale, Illinois		
Alpha Theta	before 1981	Seton Hall University	South Orange, New Jersey	Active	
Alpha Lambda	before 1981	Marycrest College	Davenport, Iowa		
Alpha Omicron	May 1980	North Carolina State University	Raleigh, North Carolina		
Alpha Pi	1980	Ferrum College	Ferrum, Virginia		
Alpha Rho	before May 1984	University of North Carolina at Greensboro	Greensboro, North Carolina		
**Alpha Sigma**	1978	East Texas A&M University	Commerce, Texas	Active	(Note: Chapter formed at East Texas State University, now called East Texas A&M University.)
Alpha Tau	before May 1980	Mount Mary College	Milwaukee, Wisconsin		
Beta Beta		Texas Tech University	Lubbock, Texas		
Beta Epsilon		University of St. Thomas	Saint Paul, Minnesota		
Beta Zeta		University of Wisconsin-Waukesha	Waukesha, Wisconsin		
Beta Lambda	198x ?	Harding University	Searcy, Arkansas	Active	
Beta Mu	before May 1982	University of South Carolina	Columbia, South Carolina		
Beta Nu	before May 1981	Averett College	Danville, Virginia		
Beta Xi	before September 1982–19xx ?; May 2003	Longwood University	Farmville, Virginia	Active	
Beta Omicron	198x ?	Southwest Missouri State University	Springfield, Missouri		
**Beta Rho**	1981	Temple University	Philadelphia, Pennsylvania	Active	
**Beta Tau**	198x ?	Prairie View A&M University	Prairie View, Texas	Active	
Beta Phi	198x ?	Elizabethtown College	Elizabethtown, Pennsylvania		
**Beta Chi**	1982	Rhode Island College	Providence, Rhode Island	Active	
Gamma Alpha	October 1982	Radford University	Radford, Virginia		
Gamma Beta	1983	University of Southern Mississippi	Hattiesburg, Mississippi		
Gamma Gamma		Southern Illinois University Edwardsville	Edwardsville, Illinois		
Gamma Delta		Louisiana State University	Baton Rouge, Louisiana		
Gamma Epsilon	198x ?	Indiana University	Indianapolis, Indiana		
Gamma Zeta	198x ?	Meredith College	Raleigh, North Carolina		
Gamma Eta	1985	Delta State University	Cleveland, Mississippi		
Gamma Mu	1986	Augustana College	Sioux Falls, South Dakota		
Gamma Nu	1986	Winona State University	Winona, Minnesota		
**Gamma Omicron**	April 1986	Lamar University	Beaumont, Texas	Active	
Gamma Xi	March 1986	Weber State University	Ogden, Utah		
Gamma Tau		Catholic University of America	Washington, D.C.		
Gamma Upsilon		Middle Tennessee State University	Murfreesboro, Tennessee		
Gamma Omega	1991	Wright State University	Fairborn, Ohio		
**Delta Gamma**		University of North Carolina at Pembroke	Pembroke, North Carolina	Active	
Delta Epsilon		Delaware State University	Dover, Delaware	Active	
Delta Xi		Providence College	Providence, Rhode Island	Active	
Epsilon Delta	Before March 2015	Valdosta State University	Valdosta, Georgia		
		Andrews University	Berrien Springs, Michigan		
		Auburn University	Auburn, Alabama	Active	
	before July 1989	Baylor University	Waco, Texas		
		College of St. Catherine	Saint Paul, Minnesota		
	xxxx ?–c. 2016	East Central University	Ada, Oklahoma	Inactive	(Note: Alpha Delta Mu was replaced by the Phi Alpha social work honor society in the fall of 2016.)
		Marywood University	Scranton, Pennsylvania	Active	
	before December 1982	Morningside College	Sioux City, Iowa		
		Northern Kentucky University	Highland Heights, Kentucky		
	before April 1982	Pittsburg State University	Pittsburg, Kansas		
		Rutgers University–Camden	Camden, New Jersey	Active	
Beta	before June 1980	Saint Francis University	Loretto, Pennsylvania	Active	
	before May 1981	San Jose State University	San Jose, California		
		Sioux Falls College	Sioux Falls, South Dakota		
	before May 1980	Texas Woman's University	Denton, Texas		
		Tuskegee University	Tuskegee, Alabama	Inactive	
	before July 1981	University of Mississippi	University, Mississippi		
		University of North Carolina at Charlotte	Charlotte, North Carolina		
		University of Northern Iowa	Cedar Falls, Iowa	Active	
	before February 1981	University of Tennessee at Martin	Martin, Tennessee		
	before September 1990	University of Texas at Arlington	Arlington, Texas		
		Virginia State University	Ettrick, Virginia	Inactive	
		West Virginia State University	Institute, West Virginia	Active	
