= Phi Alpha =

Phi Alpha may refer to:

- Phi Alpha Literary Society, a men's literary society at Illinois College
- Phi Alpha (fraternity), a historically Jewish fraternity
- Phi Alpha Honor Society, a social work honor society
- Phi Alpha, the motto of social fraternity Sigma Alpha Epsilon
