= ΣΤ =

ΣΤ may refer to:

- Stigma (ligature), a ligature of the Greek letters sigma and tau (Ϛ), also used as ΣΤʹ or στʹ, as an alternative form of the Greek numeral Ϛʹ (6)
- Sigma Tau, a former American honor society
