= Epsilon Mu Eta =

American engineering management honor society

- ΕΜΗ
- Logo of Epsilon Mu Eta
- Founded: June 15, 2003; 23 years ago St. Louis, Missouri, U.S.
- Type: Honor
- Affiliation: ACHS; ASEM
- Status: Active
- Emphasis: Engineering management
- Scope: National
- Chapters: 17
- Members: 1,200 lifetime
- Headquarters: 200 Sparkman Drive, Suite 2 Huntsville, Alabama 35805; United States
- Website: www.asem.org/Epsilon-Mu-Eta

Epsilon Mu Eta (ΕΜΗ) is an American honor society in the field of engineering management. It was founded during the 2003 convention of the American Society for Engineering Management (ASEM) in St. Louis, Missouri. Epsilon Mu Eta is a member of the Association of College Honor Societies.

== History ==
Epsilon Mu Eta was established on June 15, 2003, at the convention of the American Society for Engineering Management (ASEM) in St. Louis, Missouri. It was created as an honor society for students in the field of engineering management at the undergraduate, master's, and doctoral levels. It also recognizes professional achievement and service to the field of engineering management.

It became a member of the Association of College Honor Societies in 2025. In 2026, Epsilon Mu Eta initiated 1,200 student and faculty members.

== Symbols ==
Epsilon Mu Eta members may wear a society medal at commencement.

== Chapters ==
The following is a list of the chapters of Epsilon Mu Eta, with active chapters indicated in bold and inactive chapters in italics.

Chapter	Symbols	Charter date and range	Institution	Location	Status	References
Alpha Alpha	αα		Old Dominion University	Norfolk, Virginia	Active	
Alpha Beta	αβ		Stevens Institute of Technology	Hoboken, New Jersey	Active	
Alpha Chi	αχ	May 2003	United States Military Academy	West Point, New York	Active	(Note: Founding member of Epsilon Mu Eta.)
Alpha Delta	αδ		Christian Brothers University	Memphis, Tennessee	Active	
Alpha Epsilon	αε		University of Alabama in Huntsville	Huntsville, Alabama	Active	
Alpha Phi	αφ		Missouri University of Science and Technology	Rolla, Missouri	Active	
Alpha Gamma	αγ		Western Michigan University	Kalamazoo, Michigan	Active	
Alpha Eta	αη		University of North Carolina at Charlotte	Charlotte, North Carolina	Active	
Alpha Iota	αι		University of the Pacific	Stockton, California	Active	
Alpha Kappa	ακ		University of Tennessee Space Institute	Tullahoma, Tennessee	Active	
Alpha Lambda	αλ		University of Minnesota Duluth	Duluth, Minnesota	Active	
Beta Alpha	βα		Texas Tech University	Lubbock, Texas	Active	
Beta Beta	ββ		George Washington University	Washington, D.C.	Active	
Beta Chi	βγ		South Dakota State University	Brookings, South Dakota	Active	
Beta Delta	βδ		Auburn University	Auburn, Alabama	Active	
Beta Epsilon	βε		University of South Florida	Tampa, Florida	Active	
Beta Phi	βφ		University of Nebraska–Lincoln	Lincoln, Nebraska	Active	

== Membership ==
Epsilon Mu Eta membership is offered to engineering management students at the undergraduate, graduate, and doctoral levels who display academic achievement and exceptional character. Character is defined as integrity, leadership, and professionalism. In addition to engineering management students, Epsilon Mu Eta also accepts students who are pursuing engineering, engineering technology, and technical management degrees.

Non-students may also be nominated to become senior members of Epsilon Mu Eta, based on their skills and character. Faculty can also be admitted to Epsilon Mu Eta; their nominations are reviewed by the American Society of Engineering Management.

== Notable members ==
- Larry Richards, academic and engineer who specializes in cybernetics
- Timothy Trainor, president of Mount St. Mary's University, United States Army brigadier general, an dean of the United States Military Academy
