= Epsilon Pi Phi =

Honor society for emergency management

- ΕΠΦ
- Founded: 2006; 20 years ago Washington, DC
- Type: Honor
- Affiliation: ACHS
- Status: Active
- Emphasis: Emergency management, homeland security, disaster research and science, criminal justice, and continuity management disciplines
- Scope: National
- Colors: Green, Gold, and Navy Blue
- Chapters: 20 active
- Headquarters: 2743 Herrington CV; Round Rock, Texas 78665-2621; United States
- Website: www.epsilonpiphi.org

Epsilon Pi Phi (ΕΠΦ) is an American honor society recognizing academic achievement among students in the field of emergency management, homeland security, and disaster research. It was established in 2006. It is an Association of College Honor Societies member.

== History ==
The Foundation for Higher Education Accreditation (now the Council for the Accreditation of Emergency Management and Homeland Security Education) established Epsilon Pi Phi in 2006 in Washington, D.C. It is an honor society that recognizes academic achievement of students in emergency management, homeland security, disaster research and science, criminal justice, and continuity management disciplines.

In 2015, Epsilon Pi Phi received its IRS ruling as a 501(c)3 nonprofit organization. It was admitted to the Association of College Honor Societies in 2017. Its headquarters are at 2743 Herrington CV in Round Rock, Texas.

== Symbols ==
The Greek letters Epsilon Pi Phi or EPP were selected to stand for Emergency Preparedness Professional. The colors of the society are green, navy blue, and gold, representing balance and progression, bravery and dedication, and wisdom and ambition. At graduation, its members may wear an honor cord is green, navy blue, and gold.

The society's logo includes an upward look at the Jefferson Memorial, selected to represent "the pursuit of education and the development of a better future", as well as the goal of "educating stakeholders and developing resilient communities". The outline of the logo is the border of Washington, D.C., founding location of Epsilon Pi Phi and symbolizing national pride.

== Chapters ==
Following are the chapters of Epsilon Pi Phi, in alphabetical order. Inactive institutions are in italics.

Charter date	Institution	Location	Status	Ref.
	American Military University/American Public University	Charles Town, West Virginia	Active	
	Anna Maria College	Paxton, Massachusetts	Active	
	Arkansas State University	Jonesboro, Arkansas	Active	
	Arkansas Tech University	Russellville, Arkansas	Active	
	Campbell University	Buies Creek, North Carolina	Active	
	Capella University	Online	Active	
	Franklin University	Columbus, Ohio	Active	
	Indiana University–Purdue University Indianapolis	Indianapolis, Indiana	Inactive	(Note: IUPUI split into Indiana University Indianapolis and Purdue University in Indianapolis on July 1, 2024.)
	John Jay College of Criminal Justice	New York City, New York	Active	
	Metropolitan College of New York	New York City, New York	Active	
	Millersville University of Pennsylvania	Millersville, Pennsylvania	Active	
	Nova Southeastern University	Fort Lauderdale and Davie, Florida	Active	
	Ohio Christian University	Circleville, Ohio	Active	
	Oklahoma State University	Stillwater, Oklahoma	Active	
	Pennsylvania Western University, California	California, Pennsylvania	Active	(Note: Chapter was chartered at the California University of Pennsylvania which became Pennsylvania Western University, California in 2022.)
	Rowan University	Glassboro, New Jersey	Active	
	Thomas Jefferson University	Philadelphia, Pennsylvania	Active	(Note: Chapter was chartered at Philadelphia University, which became Thomas Jefferson University in 2018.)
	University at Albany, SUNY	Albany, New York	Active	
2022	University of Florida	Gainesville, Florida	Active	
	University of Guam	Mangilao, Guam	Active	
2002	University of New Haven	West Haven, Connecticut	Active	
	Western Carolina University	Cullowhee, North Carolina	Active	

== See also ==
- Honor cords
