= Delta Tau Alpha =

American agriculture honor society

- ΔΤΑ
- Founded: March 19, 1960; 66 years ago Southwest Missouri State College
- Type: Honor
- Affiliation: ACHS
- Status: Active
- Emphasis: Agriculture
- Scope: National
- Colors: Green and Harvest gold
- Symbol: Corn, Wheat, Scroll
- Flower: Chrysanthemum
- Publication: The Achiever
- Chapters: 31
- Members: 16,000 lifetime
- Headquarters: National DTA c/o Dr. Elizabeth Walker, MSU, School of Agriculture, 2401 S Kansas Expressway; Springfield, Missouri 65807; United States
- Website: nactateachers.org/page/DTA

Delta Tau Alpha (ΔΤΑ) is an American scholastic honor society for the field of agriculture. It was established at Southwest Missouri State College in 1960.

== History ==
The Honor Society of Delta Tau Alpha was founded at Southwest Missouri State College on March 19, 1960. Its purpose is the promote and recognize leadership and scholarship of agricultural students. It also promotes character development and helps prepare undergraduate students for a career in agriculture.

The society held its first national convention in March 1960. Its emblem was adopted at that convention. Delta Tau Alpha was admitted to the Association of College Honor Societies in 1992. The society has 31 active chapters across the United States and a total membership of approximately 16,000.

== Symbols ==
Delta Tau Alpha's colors are green and harvest gold. Green represents "the fresh, new ideas that members bring into agriculture, just as a new crop springs to life each year"; harvest yellow was selected to represent "reaping the benefits of technology through the application of knowledge in the same way a farmer harvests his golden crop of grain"

Its flower is the chrysanthemum. Its symbols are corn, wheat, and a scroll. Corn and wheat represent hard work, experimentation, and products of applied education. The scroll symbolizes the society's founding ideals of "scholarship, character, responsibility, leadership, and lifelong commitment".

The society's emblem features a scroll. On top of the scroll is a Greek letter Delta (Δ) formed by wheat on the upper two sides and an ear of corn on the bottom. The Greek letter Delta signifies change because agricultural professionals continually adapt to changing environments and resources. In the center of the letter Delta is the fraternity's Greek letters, ΔΤΑ, stacked on top of each other.

Delta Tau Alpha's publication is The Achiever.

== Activities ==
The society has an annual convention each spring that rotates between member campuses. It presents awards for the best chapter, outstanding teacher-advisor, and the winner of an agricultural knowledge contest. Chapters award scholarships and participate in community service activities, including canned food drives for local food banks, educating children about livestock, and donating to The Angel Tree Project.

== Membership ==
To be eligible for membership in Delta Tau Alpha, a student must have completed at least nine semester hours in agricultural courses and 45 hours in college courses, with a rank in the top 35 percent of their class. Members are initiated at a ceremony and reception/banquet. Membership is for life.

== Chapters ==
Following is a list of Delta Tau Alpha chapters.

Chapter	Charter date and range	City	State	Status	Ref.
Abilene Christian University	March 19, 1960	Abilene	Texas	Active	
Angelo State University	1998	San Angelo	Texas	Active	
Arkansas State University		Jonesboro	Arkansas	Active	
Austin Peay State University		Clarksville	Tennessee	Active	
Berea College		Berea	Kentucky	Active	
College of the Ozarks		Point Lookout	Missouri	Active	
Crowder College		Neosho	Missouri	Active	
Delaware Valley College		Doylestown	Pennsylvania	Active	
Eastern Kentucky University		Richmond	Kentucky	Active	
Ferrum College		Ferrum	Virginia	Active	
Fort Hays State University		Hays	Kansas	Active	
Mcneese State University		Lake Charles	Louisiana	Inactive	
Middle Tennessee State University		Murfreesboro	Tennessee	Active	
Missouri State University		Springfield	Missouri	Active	
Morehead State University		Morehead	Kentucky	Active	
Nicholls State University		Thibodaux	Louisiana	Inactive	
North Carolina State University	1995	Raleigh	North Carolina	Active	
Northwest Missouri State University		Maryville	Missouri	Active	
Sam Houston State University		Huntsville	Texas	Active	
Southeast Missouri State University		Cape Girardeau	Missouri	Active	
Southern Arkansas University		Magnolia	Arkansas	Active	
Stephen F. Austin State University		Nacogdoches	Texas	Active	
Sul Ross State University		Alpine	Texas	Active	
Tennessee Tech		Cookeville	Tennessee	Active	
Texas A&M University–Commerce		Commerce	Texas	Active	
Texas State University		San Marcos	Texas	Active	
Truman State University		Kirksville	Missouri	Active	
University of Central Missouri		Warrensburg	Missouri	Active	
University of Louisiana at Monroe		Monroe	Louisiana	Active	
University of Maryland Eastern Shore		Princess Anne	Maryland	Active	
Wilmington College		Wilmington	Ohio	Active	

== See also ==
- Association of College Honor Societies
- Honor cords
