= Alpha Alpha Alpha =

American collegiate honor society

- ΑΑΑ
- Seal of Alpha Alpha Alpha
- Founded: March 24, 2018; 8 years ago Moravian College
- Type: Honor
- Affiliation: Independent
- Status: Active
- Emphasis: First-generation college students
- Scope: National
- Colors: Blue and Grey/Silver
- Chapters: 286 active
- Nickname: Tri-Alpha
- Headquarters: 1200 Main Street; Bethlehem, Pennsylvania 18018; United States
- Website: www.1stgenhonors.org

Alpha Alpha Alpha Honor Society (Tri-Alpha) is an American honor society for first-generation college students. It was formed in 2018 at Moravian College in Bethlehem, Pennsylvania.

== History ==
Alpha Alpha Alpha (Tri-Alpha) was an initiative of Carol Traupman-Carr, the associate provost of Moravian College (now Moravian University) in Bethlehem, Pennsylvania. It was established with the initiation of more than 100 members on March 24, 2018. Tri-Alpha was created as an honor society for first-generation college students.

Later, the honor society was incorporated as a (501)(c)(3) nonprofit corporation to expand to other colleges and universities. Tri-Alpha recognizes the academic achievements of first-generation colleges students, creates a support network for those students, promotes leadership, and encourages enthusiasm for academics. Initially, it expanded to small liberal arts colleges. By April 2021, it has chartered 89 chapters.

As of 2024, Alpha Alpha Alpha has chartered 287 chapters in the United States. Its headquarters are in Bethlehem, Pennsylvania.

== Symbols ==
Alpha Alpha Alpha's emblem is an organizational pin. The pin features Tri-Alpha's logo, which includes a star in the center of several circles. The star symbolizes the inductees, who are "beacons of light for others to follow". The circles represent its member's various communities—the university community, their home community, and the wider world.

Tri-Alpha's colors and honor cord are blue and grey/silver.

== Membership ==
Membership is by invitation and is open to undergraduate students, graduate students, faculty, and staff whose parents or guardians did not complete a bachelor's degree. Eligible undergraduates must have complete thirty hours with a 3.2 GPA, and graduate students must have finished nine hours with a 3.5 GPA. Faculty are eligible if they meet the criteria as a first-generation student when they completed their undergraduate degree. Tri-Alpha also initiates a small number of honorary and alumni members each year. Once initiated, membership is for life.

== Chapters ==
As of 2024, Alpha Alpha Alpha has chartered 287 chapters in the United States.

== See also ==
- Honor cord
