= Chi Sigma Iota =

International honor society for counselors

- ΧΣΙ
- Founded: January 1, 1985; 41 years ago Ohio University
- Type: Honor
- Affiliation: ACHS
- Status: Active
- Emphasis: Counseling
- Scope: International
- Colors: White and Blue
- Chapters: 450+
- Members: 170,000+ active
- Headquarters: P.O. Box 1829; Thomasville, North Carolina 27360; United States
- Website: www.csi-net.org

Chi Sigma Iota Counseling Academic and Professional Honor Society International (ΧΣΙ, CSI, or Chi Sigma Iota) is the international and professional academic honor society for counseling students, counselor educators, and professional counselors. CSI is a member of the Association of College Honor Societies (ACHS), the certifying agency for college and university honor societies that sets the standards for organizational excellence and scholastic eligibility.

The mission of CSI is to promote scholarship, research, professionalism, leadership and excellence in counseling, and to recognize high attainment in the pursuit of academic and clinical excellence in the profession of counseling.

== History ==
Chi Sigma Iota (CSI) was established on January 1, 1985, with the chartering of the Alpha chapter at Ohio University. It is an academic and professional honor society for counseling students, counselor educators, and professional counselors.

In 1988, CSI negotiated with Rho Chi Sigma, the national rehabilitation counseling and services honor society, to establish a single honor society for professional counselors. All chapters of Rho Chi Sigma were officially merged into CSI in March 1989.

Thomas J. Sweeney, professor emeritus of counselor education at Ohio University, was the founding president and the association’s first executive director. Sweeney retired as executive director of CSI in May 2012. The CSI Headquarters staff includes Holly Moorhead as the current Chief Executive Officer.

Chi Sigma Iota is a certified member of the Association of College Honor Societies (ACHS).

== Symbols ==
Chi Sigma Iota's colors are blue, representing trustworthiness, and white, representing virtue and integrity. The Greek letters ΧΣΙ denote Counseling Society International. The wreath within CSI's logo was chosen to encircle the Greek letters ΧΣΙ as a symbol of honor earned and promise for continued commitment to high ideals.

== Membership ==
CSI's membership includes both master's and doctoral-level graduate students enrolled in counseling programs, professional counselors, and counselor educators. The association's bylaws state that membership is by invitation through local chapters to students or graduates of an active chapter’s counselor education program. To be eligible for membership, students must complete at least one semester of full-time graduate coursework in a counselor education degree program, earn a grade point average of 3.5 or higher on a 4.0 system, and be recommended for membership by the chapter as promising for endorsement as a professional counselor whose ethical judgment and behavior will be exemplary. Faculty and alumni of a chapter may be inducted into CSI if they meet the G.P.A. requirement as graduates of a counselor education program and are endorsed by the chapter.

As of May 2025, Chi Sigma Iota has over 176,000 members who have been initiated into the Society through more than 460 chapters. Chapters are supported at least in part by funding from CSI. New chapters of CSI may be established in counselor education training programs accredited by The Council for Accreditation of Counseling and Related Educational Programs (CACREP).

== Activities ==
=== Publications ===
CSI publishes the Exemplar, a quarterly magazine for members, and the Journal of Counselor Leadership and Advocacy. In addition, selected books are endorsed for publication. In 2012, Professional Counseling Excellence through Leadership and Advocacy was selected for the 2012 Publication in Counselor Education and Supervision Award, given annually by the Association for Counselor Education and Supervision.

The Counselors' Bookshelf is an online compendium of reviews of professional books, fiction, movies and television shows, and music with implications for how counselors can use the various media for personal and professional development as well as helping interventions with clients.

=== Annual Meetings ===
CSI Days are annual meetings for membership that include the CSI Annual Delegate Business Meeting for representatives from every CSI chapter, a meeting of CSI’s Executive Council, leadership trainings for chapter leaders and Chapter Faculty Advisors, an awards ceremony, and networking opportunities.

== Governance ==
Each chapter of CSI has a Chapter Faculty Advisor and chapter officers. The CSI Executive Council includes elected officers (president, president-elect, past president, secretary, and treasurer), two CSI leadership interns, and the Chief Executive Officer. Active members of the society can volunteer to chair or serve on CSI committees and review panels for grants and awards, all of which receive charges from the Executive Council. Members may also volunteer to serve on editorial review boards for the CSI Counselors' Bookshelf. The CSI Headquarters staff includes Holly Moorhead as the current Chief Executive Officer.

== See also ==
- Honor cords
