= Mortar Board =

American collegiate honor society

- Founded: February 15, 1918; 108 years ago Syracuse, New York, US
- Type: Honor
- Affiliation: ACHS
- Status: Active
- Scope: National
- Motto: ΠΣΑ "Scholarship, Service and Leadership"
- Colors: Gold and Silver
- Symbol: Mortar Board
- Publication: Mortar Board Forum
- Chapters: 104 active
- Members: 432,000+ lifetime
- Headquarters: 1200 Chambers Road, Suite 201; Columbus, Ohio 43212; United States
- Website: www.mortarboard.org

Mortar Board is an American national honor society for college juniors and seniors. It was established in 1918 in Syracuse, New York through the merger of four local women's organizations from four institutions. It started admitting men in 1975. Mortar Board has chartered 235 collegiate chapters. It is a member of the Association of College Honor Societies.

== History ==
Mortar Board was founded in Syracuse, New York on February 15, 1918. It was the first national honor society for college senior women and continues to promote women's interests in higher education today. The organization coalesced by the agreement of four local women's honor societies. The founding local organizations were:

- Der Hexenkreis, Cornell University
- Mortar Board, Ohio State University
- Mortarboard, University of Michigan
- Pi Sigma Chi, Swarthmore College

These and other chapters continue the tradition of adopting unique, historical, or symbolic local names as their chapter designations, and do not use traditional alphabetized Greek letter names as are common among other honor societies.

The society was originally unnamed. The predecessor local at Ohio State was called Mortar Board, using two separate words, and it was noted that its members and those of a group at Swarthmore both wore pins in the shape of a mortarboard. From this, a pin representative of a mortarboard was adopted at the first national convention on February 15, 1918, and the name Mortar Board was adopted at the second convention, a year later.

The society proliferated, adopting a district governance structure by 1923 when it had already grown to eighteen chartered chapters. By 1925 the Mortar Board Quarterly was established as the official publication, now called the Forum. Mortar Board was invited into the Association of College Honor Societies (ACHS) in 1937, the only women's honor society to be invited up until that time.

The society admitted men in 1975 as a ramification of Title IX, at which point a clause was added in its purpose to include "to promote and advance the status of women." This was further revised the following year to read, "...to emphasize the advancement of the status of women" and "to promote equal opportunities among all people."

By 2012, the society had 229 active chapters, 16 alumni clubs, 5,700 active members, and 431,400 total initiates. As of 2024, it has 5,000 active members. Its national headquarters is in Columbus, Ohio.

== Symbols ==
Mortar Board's motto is the Greek letters "Pi Sigma Alpha", representing the ideals of "Scholarship, Service, and Leadership". The society's symbol is the square academic cap known as a mortarboard, symbolizing honor and distinction. Its colors are gold and silver. Gold symbolizes achievement, and silver symbolizes opportunity. Its badge is in the shape of a mortar board in black, with a gold tassel and edging, and the Greek letters ΠΣΑ in gold.

It publications are Mortar Board Forum and MBits.

== Membership ==
Membership in Mortar Board is open to college juniors and seniors for outstanding academics, leadership, and service. Potential members must be in the top 35 percent of the class with at least a 3.0 GPA. New members are recruited through a tapping process. Tapping ceremonies vary between chapters, with some using the "Tapping Song".

== Organization ==
Mortar Board, Inc. is governed by collegiate chapters. National officers come from the ranks of alumni and collegiate members.

=== National office ===
Mortar Board's national office is located at 1200 Chambers Road, Suite 201, in Columbus, Ohio. It is the source of records and information related to chapter operations, national conferences, alumni, the Mortar Board National Foundation and the historical archives of Mortar Board. The staff enacts policies and procedures established by the National Council and the Mortar Board National Foundation.

=== National Foundation ===
The National Foundation was established in 1955 as the fundraising arm of Mortar Board, as well as to serve the educational aims of Mortar Board, Inc. The mission of the National Foundation is to support Mortar Board, Inc. in furthering its ideals of scholarship, leadership, and service.

=== Region Coordinators ===
Region Coordinators work directly with chapters, serving as close primary contacts for chapters within a specified geographic region. The region coordinator is available to assist the chapters with a variety of tasks, including planning and execution of events.

== Chapters ==
As of 2024, the Mortar Board has chartered 235 chapters in 45 states and has 104 active chapters.

== Notable members ==
More than a quarter of a million members have been initiated nationwide. Some notable alumni include:

== See also ==
- Honor cords
