= Mu Kappa Tau =

American honor society for marketing students

- ΜΚΤ
- Founded: 1966; 60 years ago Arizona State University
- Type: Honor
- Affiliation: ACHS
- Status: Active
- Emphasis: Marketing
- Scope: International
- Motto: "Marketing. Knowledge. Tradition."
- Colors: Navy blue
- Chapters: 54
- Members: 405 active 15,000 lifetime
- Headquarters: c/o Pi Sigma Epsilon; 4811 S 76th St. Greenfield, Wisconsin 53220; United States
- Website: www.mukappatau.org

Mu Kappa Tau (ΜΚΤ) is a North American scholastic honor society that recognizes academic achievement in the field of marketing. It was established in 1966 and was admitted to the Association of College Honor Societies in 1996.

== History ==
Mu Kappa Tau was founded at Arizona State University in 1966 by the members of Pi Sigma Epsilon. Its purpose is the recognize academic excellence and to encourage a lifelong commitment to ethics and excellence in the field of marketing.

It was admitted to the Association of College Honor Societies in 1996.

Mu Kappa Tau honor society has 54 chapters across the United States. It has initiated approximately 15,000, with 405 active members as of 2015.

== Symbols ==
The color of Mu Kappa Tau in navy blue. Its motto is "Marketing, Knowledge, Tradition".

== Activities ==
Mu Kappa Tau hosts workshops and speakers, awards scholarships, and maintains an online Job Board. It also provides opportunities for nationwide networking, including its annual meeting at The National Sales and Marketing Convention; scholarships.

== Membership ==
Membership in Mu Kappa Tau is open to junior and seniors who are majoring in marketing, are in the top ten percent of their class, and have an overall 3.25 GPA. Graduate students are eligible after completing half of their coursework, along with doctoral candidates who are completing their coursework. Faculty and professionals who have shown a commitment to the marketing field may also join.

== Chapters ==
Following is a list of Mu Kappa Tau. Active chapters are indicated in bold. Inactive chapters are in italics.

Chapter	Charter date and range	Location	Status	Ref.
Arizona State University	1966	Tempe, Arizona	Inactive	
Alfred University		Alfred, New York	Active	
Auburn University at Montgomery		Montgomery, Alabama	Active	
Berkeley College New Jersey		Paramus, New Jersey	Active	
Berkeley College New York		New York City, New York	Active	
Brigham Young University		Provo, Utah	Active	
Buena Vista University		Storm Lake, Iowa	Active	
California Polytechnic State University, San Luis Obispo		San Luis Obispo, California	Active	
East Carolina University		Greenville, North Carolina	Active	
Elon University		Elon, North Carolina	Active	
Georgia Southern University		Statesboro, Georgia	Active	
Hampton University		Hampton, Virginia	Active	
Hawaii Pacific University		Honolulu, Hawaii	Active	
Howard University		Washington, D.C.	Active	
Jacksonville State University		Jacksonville, Alabama	Active	
James Madison University		Harrisonburg, Virginia	Active	
Kean University		Union Township, New Jersey	Active	
King's College		Wilkes-Barre, Pennsylvania	Active	
Louisiana State University		Baton Rouge, Louisiana	Active	
Loyola University Maryland		Baltimore, Maryland	Active	
Manhattan College		Riverdale, Bronx, New York	Active	
Miami University		Oxford, Ohio	Active	
Middle Tennessee State University		Murfreesboro, Tennessee	Active	
Mississippi State University		Mississippi State, Mississippi	Active	
Nichols College		Webster, Massachusetts	Active	
North Central College		Naperville, Illinois	Active	
Northern Illinois University		DeKalb, Illinois	Active	
Penn State Harrisburg		Harrisburg, Pennsylvania	Active	
PennWest Clarion		Clarion, Pennsylvania	Active	
Purdue University		West Lafayette, Indiana	Active	
Rutgers University–Camden		Camden, New Jersey	Active	
Saint Joseph's University		Philadelphia, Pennsylvania	Active	
Samford University		Birmingham, Alabama	Active	
Slippery Rock University		Slippery Rock, Pennsylvania	Active	
Southern Illinois University Carbondale		Carbondale, Illinois	Active	
Stephen F. Austin State University		Nacogdoches, Texas	Active	
University of Akron		Akron, Ohio	Active	
University of Baltimore		Baltimore, Maryland	Active	
University of Denver		Denver, Colorado	Active	
University of Hawaiʻi at Mānoa		Manoa, Hawaii	Active	
University of Louisiana at Lafayette		Lafayette, Louisiana	Active	
University of Louisiana at Monroe		Monroe, Louisiana	Active	
University of North Carolina Wilmington		Wilmington, North Carolina	Active	
University of North Texas		Denton, Texas	Active	
University of Northern Iowa		Cedar Falls, Iowa	Active	
University of South Dakota		Vermillion, South Dakota	Active	
University of Tennessee at Martin		Martin, Tennessee	Active	
University of Windsor		Windsor, Ontario, Canada	Active	
University of Wisconsin–Whitewater		Whitewater, Wisconsin	Active	
Virginia Tech		Blacksburg, Virginia	Active	
Washburn University		Topeka, Kansas	Active	

== See also ==
- Honor cords
