= Alpha Iota Delta =

Honor society for decision sciences and information systems

- ΑΙΔ
- Founded: 1971; 55 years ago Decision Sciences Institute
- Type: Honor
- Affiliation: ACHS
- Status: Active
- Emphasis: Decision Sciences
- Scope: International
- Colors: Green and Gold
- Publication: International Journal of Applied Decision Sciences (IJADS)
- Chapters: 54 (active)
- Members: 6,000+ lifetime
- Headquarters: 22200 W. Eleven Mile Road, No. 200; Southfield, Michigan 48037; United States
- Website: www.alphaiotadelta.com

Alpha Iota Delta (ΑΙΔ) is an international scholastic honor society recognizing academic achievement among students in the fields of decision sciences and Information Systems.

== History ==
Alpha Iota Delta was founded at Decision Sciences Institute in 1971. It is an honor society that recognizes academic achievement for student in the fields of decision sciences and information systems. It was admitted to the Association of College Honor Societies in 2009.

Alpha Iota Delta honor society has 54 active in the United States and Canada, and a total membership of more than 6,000. It maintains a relationship with the Decision Sciences Institute.

Its headquarters is located in Southfield, Michigan. Its publication is the International Journal of Applied Decision Sciences.

== Symbols ==
Alpha Iota Delta's colors are green and gold. Its badge is a diamond shaped key, filled with the Greek letters ΑΙΔ.

== Membership ==
Membership is open to undergraduates who have a GPA of at least 3.0 and completed four upper-level courses in computer information systems with a B+ or better in those courses.

== Chapters ==
Following is a list of Alpha Iota Delta chapters.

Chapter	Charter date	Institution	Location	Status	Ref.
Alpha		Georgia State University	Atlanta, Georgia	Active	
Beta		Drexal University	Philadelphia, Pennsylvania	Active	
Gamma		California State Polytechnic University, Pomona	Pomona, California	Active	
Delta		University of Tulsa	Tulsa, Oklahoma	Active	
Epsilon		Penn State University	State College and College Township, Pennsylvania	Active	
Zeta		University of Florida	Gainesville, Florida	Active	
Eta		Arizona State University	Tempe, Arizona	Active	
Theta		Eastern Michigan University	Ypsilanti, Michigan	Active	
Iota		University of Miami	Coral Gables, Florida	Active	
Kappa		Southern Methodist University	Dallas, Texas	Active	
Lambda		Concordia University	Montreal, Quebec, Canada	Active	
Mu		Air Force Institute of Technology	Dayton, Ohio	Active	
Nu		University of Texas at Arlington	Arlington, Texas	Active	
XI		Eastern Washington University	Cheney, Washington	Active	
Omicron		University of New Mexico	Albuquerque, New Mexico	Active	
Pi		Wright State University	Fairborn, Ohio	Active	
Rho		Baruch College	New York City	Active	
Sigma		University of Cincinnati	Cincinnati, Ohio	Active	
Tau		Colorado State University	Fort Collins, Colorado	Active	
Upsilon		New Jersey Institute of Technology	Newark, New Jersey	Active	
Phi		Virginia Commonwealth University	Richmond, Virginia	Active	
Chi		Valparaiso University	Valparaiso, Indiana	Active	
Tau Alpha		Oakland University	Oakland County, Michigan	Active	
Upsilon Alpha		University of Arkansas	Fayetteville, Arkansas	Active	
Gamma Gamma		Indiana University Bloomington	Bloomington, Indiana	Active	
Rho Delta		Rider University	Lawrence Township, New Jersey	Active	
Sigma Delta		Kent State University	Kent, Ohio	Active	
Nu Epsilon		University of Nebraska Omaha	Omaha, Nebraska	Active	
Alpha Lambda		Alfred University	Alfred, New York	Active	
Tau Lambda		National Sun Yat-sen University	Sizihwan, Kaohsiung, Taiwan	Inactive	
Alpha Mu	November 2005	Saint Joseph's University	Philadelphia, Pennsylvania	Active	
Beta Mu		Auburn University	Auburn, Alabama	Active	
Gamma Mu		California State University, Fullerton	Fullerton, California	Active	
Delta Mu		University of Detroit Mercy	Detroit, Michigan	Active	
Zeta Mu		Carnegie Mellon University	Pittsburgh, Pennsylvania	Active	
Kappa Mu		California State University, Fresno	Fresno, California	Active	
Lambda Mu		Loyola College Maryland	Baltimore, Maryland	Active	
Sigma Mu	2024	Central Michigan University	Mt. Pleasant, Michigan	Active	
Upsilon Mu		University of Minnesota	Minneapolis, Minnesota	Active	
Delta Sigma		Miami University	Oxford, Ohio	Active	
Iota Sigma		Indiana State University	Terre Haute, Indiana	Active	
Lambda Sigma		La Salle University	Philadelphia, Pennsylvania	Active	
Mu Tau		Middle Tennessee State University	Murfreesboro, Tennessee	Active	
Nu Tau		University of North Texas	Denton, Texas	Active	
Pi Upsilon		Pace University	New York City	Active	
Delta Chi	1992	Manhattan College	Bronx, New York City, New York	Active	
Epsilon Chi		East Carolina University	Greenville, North Carolina	Active	
Sigma Chi		California State University, Sacramento	Sacramento, California	Active	
Mu Sigma		Mississippi State University	Starkville, Mississippi	Active	
		Alcorn State University	Lorman, Mississippi	Active	
		Al-Zahra University	Tehran, Iran	Active	
		Berry College	Mount Berry, Georgia	Active	
		Boston University	Boston, Massachusetts	Active	
		Brigham Young University	Provo, Utah	Active	
		Bucknell University	Lewisburg, Pennsylvania	Active	
		California State University, Long Beach	Long Beach, California	Active	
		Chonnam National University	Gwangju, South Korea	Active	
		Claremont McKenna College	Claremont, California	Active	
		Clark Atlanta University	Atlanta, Georgia	Active	
		Dowling College	Oakdale, New York	Inactive	(Note: College closed in 2016.)
		Eastern Connecticut State University	Willimantic, Connecticut	Active	
		East Tennessee State University	Johnson City, Tennessee	Active	
		Florida State University	Tallahassee, Florida	Active	
		Fordham University	New York City	Active	
		Georgia Southern University	Statesboro, Georgia	Active	
		James Madison University	Harrisonburg, Virginia	Active	
		John Carroll University	University Heights, Ohio	Active	
		Kansas State University	Manhattan, Kansas	Active	
		Kettering University	Flint, Michigan	Active	
		LaGrange College	LaGrange, Georgia	Active	
		Lamar University	Beaumont, Texas	Active	
		Le Moyne College	DeWitt, New York	Active	
		Macquarie University	Sydney, Australia	Active	
		Midwestern State University	Wichita Falls, Texas	Active	
		Missouri University of Science and Technology	Rolla, Missouri	Active	
		North Carolina A&T State University	Greensboro, North Carolina	Active	
		North Carolina Central University	Durham, North Carolina	Active	
		Northern Illinois University	DeKalb, Illinois	Active	
		Nova Southeastern University	Davie, Florida	Active	
		Ohio State University	Columbus, Ohio	Active	
		Pacific Luthern University	Parkland, Washington	Active	
		Pepperdine University	Malibu, California	Active	
		Purdue University	West Lafayette, Indiana	Active	
		Qatar University	Doha, Qatar	Active	
		Qingdao University of Technology	Qingdao, China	Active	
		Rollins College	Winter Park, Florida	Active	
		Rutgers University–New Brunswick	New Brunswick, New Jersey	Active	
		Salisbury University	Salisbury, Maryland	Active	
		San Francisco State University	San Francisco, California	Active	
		Seattle University	Seattle, Washington	Active	
		Shandong University of Technology	Zibo, China	Active	
		Southern Utah University	Cedar City, Utah	Active	
		State University of West Georgia	Carrollton, Georgia	Active	
		Stephen F. Austin State University	Nacogdoches, Texas	Active	
		Universidad de las Américas Puebla	San Andrés Cholula, Mexico	Active	
		University at Buffalo	Buffalo, New York	Active	
		University of Alabama in Huntsville	Huntsville, Alabama	Active	
		University of Central Florida	Orlando, Florida	Active	
		University of Denver	Denver, Colorado	Active	
		University of Hawaiʻi at Mānoa	Honolulu, Hawaii.	Active	
		University of Houston–Clear Lake	Houston, Texas	Active	
		University of Houston–Downtown	Houston, Texas	Active	
		University of Maine	Orono, Maine	Active	
		University of Massachusetts Dartmouth	Dartmouth, Massachusetts	Active	
		University of Massachusetts Lowell	Lowell, Massachusetts	Active	
		University of Missouri	Columbia, Missouri	Active	
		University of Missouri–Kansas City	Kansas City, Missouri	Active	
		University of Nebraska–Lincoln	Lincoln, Nebraska	Active	
		University of North Carolina at Charlotte	Charlotte, North Carolina	Active	
		University of South Florida	Tampa, Florida	Active	
		University of Tennessee	Knoxville, Tennessee	Active	
		University of Texas at El Paso	El Paso, Texas	Active	
		University of Washington	Seattle, Washington	Active	
		University of Washington Bothell	Bothell, Washington	Active	
		University of West Indies		Active	
		University of Wisconsin–Milwaukee	Milwaukee, Wisconsin	Active	
		University of Wisconsin–La Crosse	La Crosse, Wisconsin	Active	
		Washington State University	Pullman, Washington	Active	
		Western Michigan University	Kalamazoo, Michigan	Active	
		Yokohama National University	Yokohama, Kanagawa Prefecture, Japan	Active	

== See also ==
- Association of College Honor Societies
