= Alpha Omega Alpha =

Honor society in the field of medicine

- ΑΩΑ
- Founded: August 2, 1902; 124 years ago University of Illinois College of Medicine
- Type: Honor
- Affiliation: Independent
- Former affiliation: ACHS
- Status: Active
- Emphasis: Medicine
- Scope: National
- Motto: "To be worthy to serve the suffering"
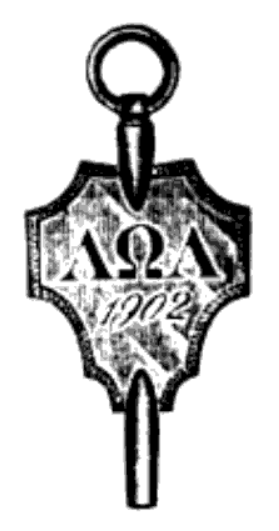
- Member badge
- Colors: Green, Gold and White
- Publication: Medical Professionalism Best Practices (series); The Pharos
- Chapters: 132
- Members: 4,000 active 200,000 lifetime
- Headquarters: 12635 E. Montview Blvd. Suite 270; Aurora, Colorado 80045; United States
- Website: www.alphaomegaalpha.org

Alpha Omega Alpha Honor Medical Society (ΑΩΑ) is an honor society in the field of medicine. It has active chapters in 132 LCME-accredited medical schools in the United States and Lebanon. It annually elects over 4,000 new members. A 2021 JAMA article, noted "Alpha Omega Alpha (ΑΩΑ) honor society membership is the hallmark of academic achievement in undergraduate medical education, and ΑΩΑ membership is associated with future success in academic medicine."

== History ==
In 1902, third-year medical student William Webster Root founded Alpha Omega Alpha while attending the College of Physicians and Surgeons (now the University of Illinois College of Medicine). Alpha Omega Alpha was founded as a coed honor society to recognize scholarly achievement and professional conduct among physicians and medical students. Its founding members were Milton Weston Hall, John Eddy Haskell, George Herbert Howard, Ernest Sisson Moore, William H. Moore, William Webster Root, Benjamin Thomas, Charles Lafayette Williams, and Wenzel Matthias Wochos.

The founders held the first organizational meeting on August 2, 1902. Root then drafted a constitution and developed the society's motto. At a meeting at the Bismarck Hotel in Chicago on September 27, 1902, 28 medical students met to ratify the constitution, adopt the society's motto, and to be inducted as Alpha Omega Alpha's first members.

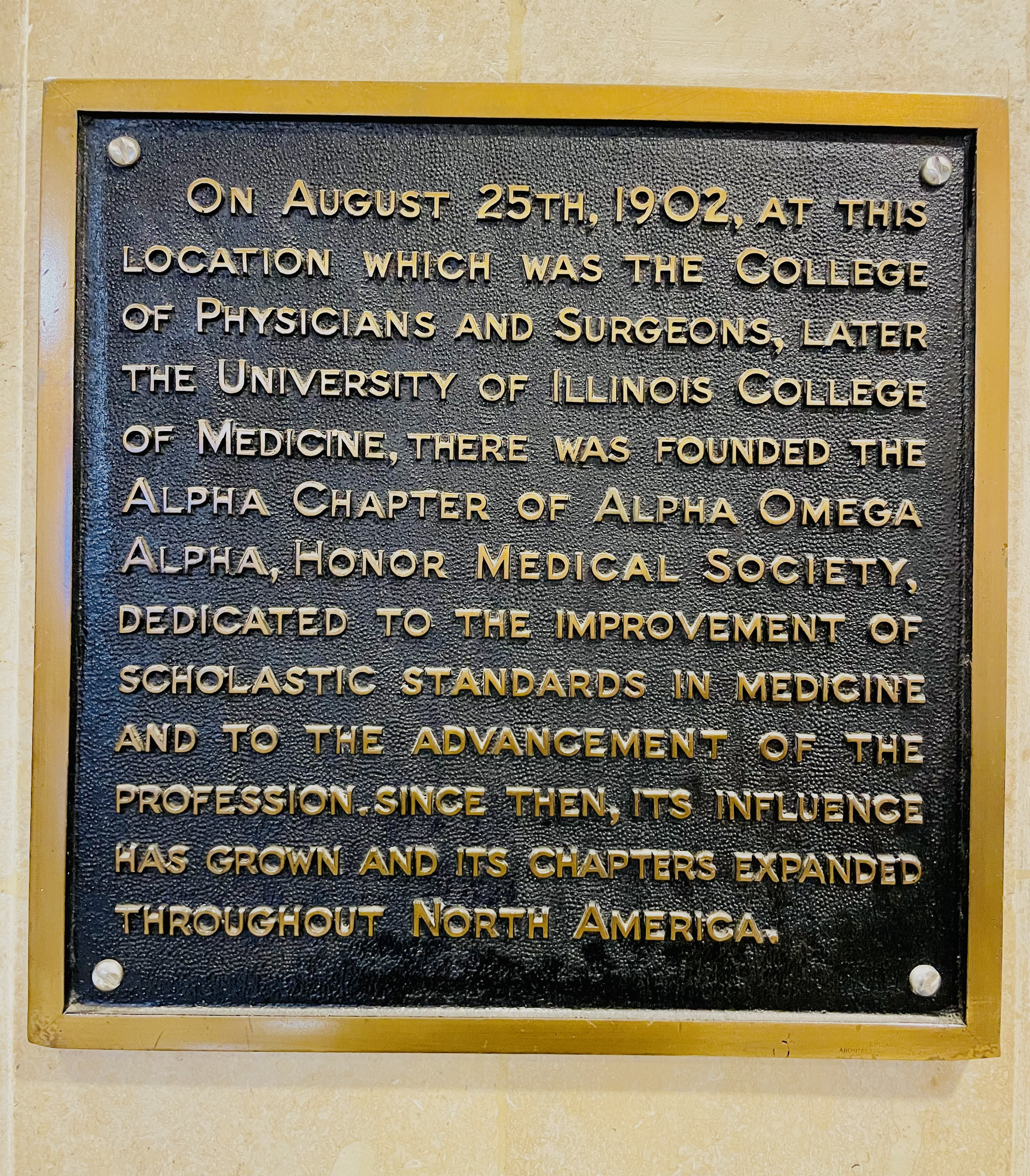
Alpha Omega Alpha Information Board present at the University of Illinois College of Medicine

Root pitched his idea to nearby schools, and Beta was established at University of Chicago's Pritzker School of Medicine in 1902, followed by Gamma at Northwestern University's Feinberg School of Medicine in 1903. Alpha Omega Alpha was incorporated in the State of Illinois in 1903. It inducted its first female member in 1906. By 1912, there were seventeen chapters. As more medical schools became interested, the national organization became more selective in the standards a school needed to meet to be eligible.

In 1930, the society had 37 active chapters and an alumni association. In 1962, that had grown to 85 active chapters and 32,340 total initiates.

Alpha Omega Alpha is a former member of the Association of College Honor Societies. The society's papers were donated to the United States National Library of Medicine in 1973 by John Z. Bowers and in 2000 by Gladys Brill Brampton. Its national headquarters is in Aurora, Colorado.

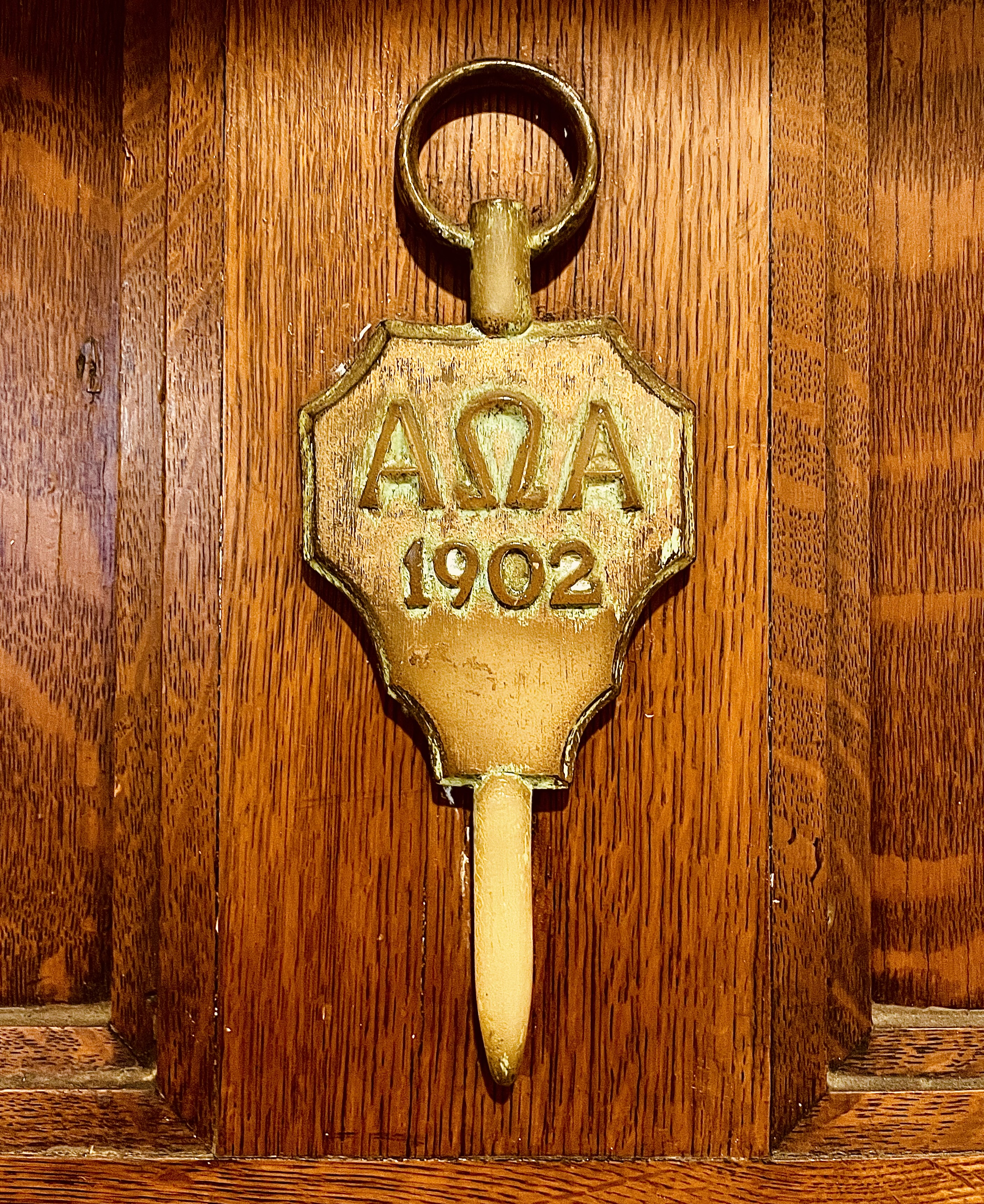
ΑΩΑ symbol, 1902

== Symbols ==
Alpha Omega Alpha's motto is "To be worthy to serve the suffering". The society's badge is a gold key, shaped like the mannbrium sterni, with the Greek letters ΑΩΑ and the founding date of 1902.

Its honor cord is Kelly green and gold, with white strands. Green represents medicine, gold is for science, and white represents the humanities. Alpha Omega Alpha first published its medical humanities journal, The Pharos, in January 1938; it was named after the Pharos lighthouse of Alexandria, one of the seven wonders of the ancient world.

== Activities ==
Medical students, faculty, and active Alpha Omega Alpha members associated with chapters are eligible to participate in the twelve national programs and society's awards, which are funded from member dues.

== Membership ==
Alpha Omega Alpha elects over 4,000 new members annually. Members are selected based on for their academic performance, leadership, patient care, and service. A 2021 JAMA article, noted "Alpha Omega Alpha (ΑΩΑ) honor society membership is the hallmark of academic achievement in undergraduate medical education, and ΑΩΑ membership is associated with future success in academic medicine."

The majority of initiates are initiated in the final year of medical school, though the society also inducts distinguished teachers, faculty members, residents, and working physicians. Alpha Omega Alpha has been inclusive of race, color, creed, sex, and social standing from its founding.

== Chapters ==
In 2025, Alpha Omega Alpha has 135 chapters at American medical schools.

== Notable members ==
In 2025, Alpha Omega Alpha had initiated more than 200,000 members. Its membership includes 59 Nobel laureates and eleven Surgeons General of the United States.

== Controversies ==
Alpha Omega Alpha elections at some institutions have been influenced by internal political and racial bias. A 2017 publication in JAMA Internal Medicine found that "Black and Asian medical students were less likely than their white counterparts to be members of ΑΩΑ, which may reflect bias in selection. In turn, ΑΩΑ membership selection may affect future opportunities for minority medical students." This pattern persisted despite controlling for other variables, such as extracurricular activities.

Many American medical schools do not have student chapters of Alpha Omega Alpha. For example, Mt. Sinai Icahn School of Medicine decided to completely forgo medical student elections into the society in September 2018. Additionally, there are no Alpha Omega chapters at Harvard, Yale, or Mayo Clinic.

== See also ==
- Professional fraternities and sororities
