= Sigma Tau =

American engineering honor society

- ΣΤ
- Founded: February 24, 1904; 122 years ago University of Nebraska
- Type: Honor
- Former affiliation: ACHS
- Status: Merged
- Merge date: January 1, 1974
- Successor: Tau Beta Pi
- Scope: National
- Colors: Navy blue and White
- Symbol: Pyramid, Rail Section
- Publication: The Pyramid
- Chapters: 34
- Members: 45,000 lifetime
- Headquarters: Tulsa, Oklahoma; United States

Sigma Tau (ΣΤ) was an American honor society in the field of engineering. It was founded at the University of Nebraska in 1904 and merged with Tau Beta Pi in 1974.

== History ==
Sigma Tau was founded at the University of Nebraska on February 24, 1904 by fourteen faculty members and students in the College of Engineering. Sigma Tau merged with Tau Beta Pi on January 1, 1974.

== Symbols ==
Sigma Tau's colors were navy blue and white. Its symbols were a pyramid and a rail section. Its publication was The Pyramid.

== Membership ==
Membership was chosen from the upper one-third of the junior and senior classes at recognized engineering schools. Selection from those men and women is made on the further basis of practicality and sociability. Approval of at least three engineering faculty is required. Distinguished members of the engineering profession may be admitted as alumni members.
