= Pi Sigma Alpha =

American honor society

- ΠΣΑ
- Founded: October 1, 1920; 105 years ago University of Texas at Austin
- Type: Honor
- Affiliation: ACHS
- Status: Active
- Emphasis: Political Science
- Scope: National
- Colors: Red and Black
- Publication: Pi Sigma Alpha Newsletter; Pi Sigma Alpha Undergraduate Journal of Politics
- Chapters: Nearly 850
- Members: 300,000 lifetime
- Headquarters: 1527 New Hampshire Ave., NW; Washington, D.C. 20036; United States
- Website: www.pisigmaalpha.org

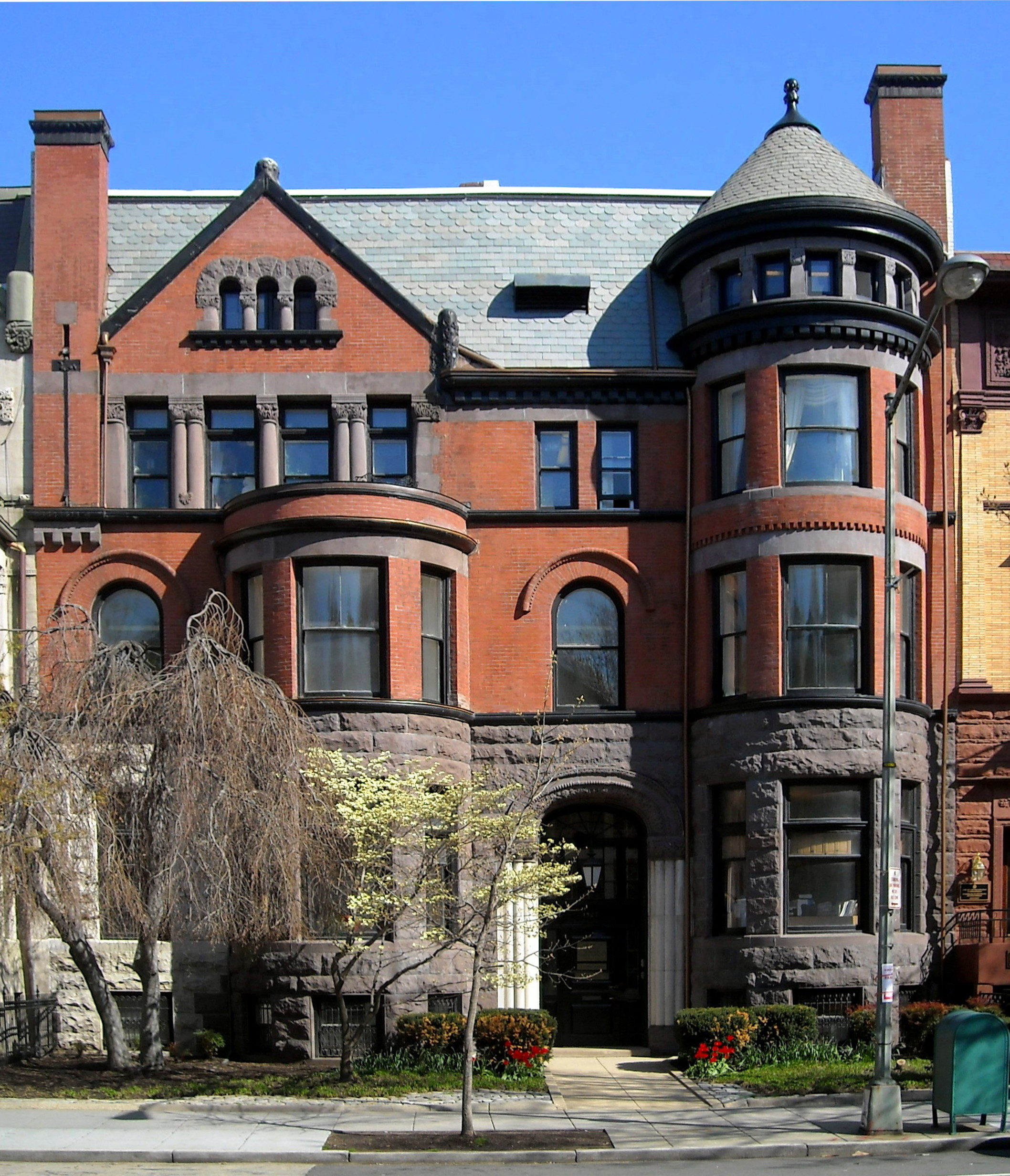
Pi Sigma Alpha headquarters located in the Dupont Circle neighborhood of Washington, D.C.

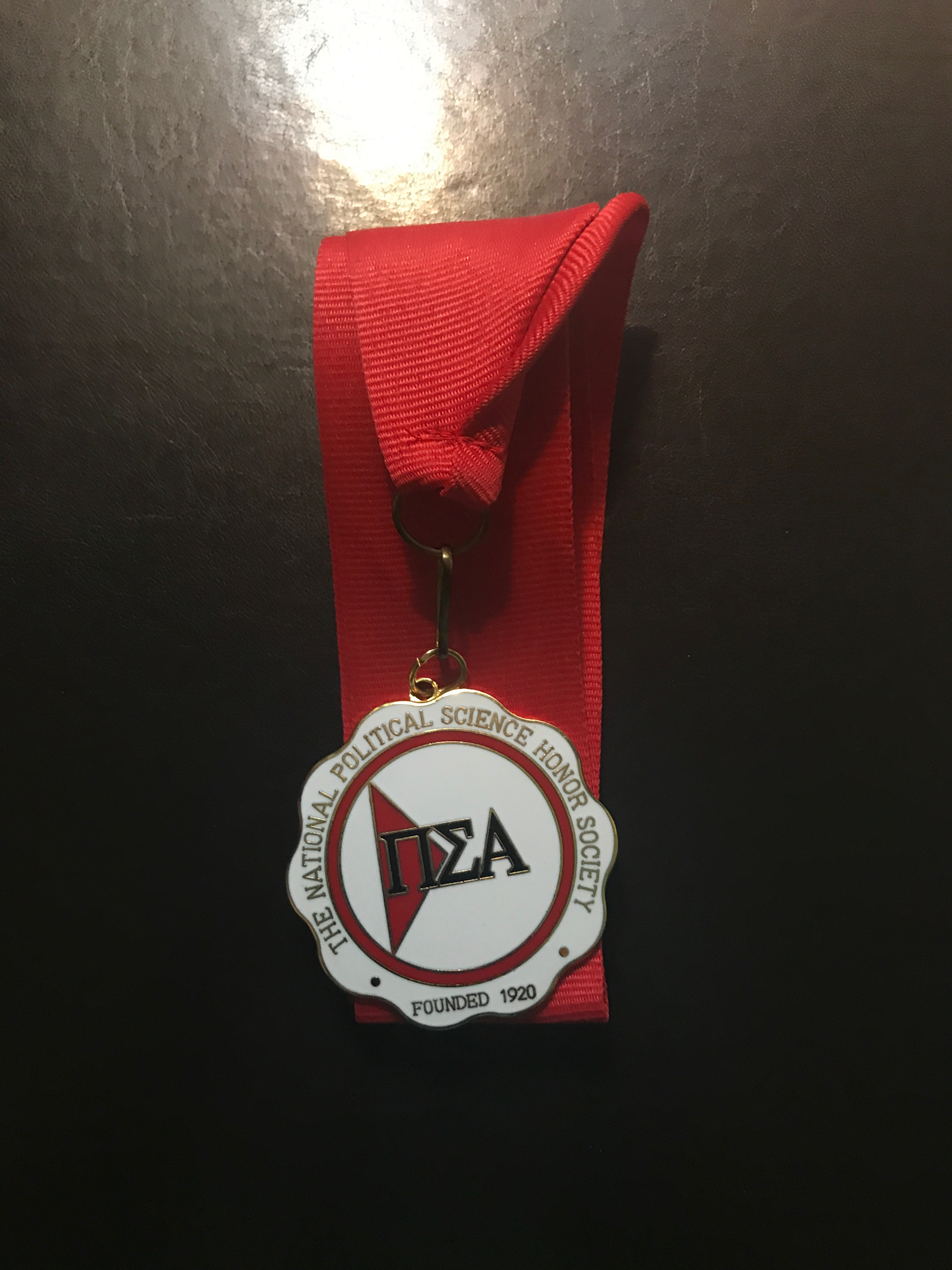
Pi Sigma Alpha Medallion used for graduation/recognition.

Pi Sigma Alpha (ΠΣΑ or PSA), the National Political Science Honor Society, is the only honor society for college and university students of political and social sciences in the United States. Its purpose is to recognize and promote high academic achievement in the field of political science. It is a member of the Association of College Honor Societies.

== Chapters ==
The first chapter of Pi Sigma Alpha was founded in 1920 at the University of Texas at Austin, and the society has grown over the years to nearly 850 campuses (as of 2020). A local chapter may be established at any college or university granting the baccalaureate or higher degrees, which is accredited by a regional or national accrediting association, and which offers a major sequence of courses in political science through an appropriate administrative department, school, or division of the institution, and which conforms to other requirements established by the Executive Council of the society. Chapters are guided by faculty advisors and by student officers.

== Membership ==
There are three classes of membership in Pi Sigma Alpha: student, faculty, and honorary. Student membership is open to juniors, seniors and graduate students currently enrolled in institutions where the chapters are located, who meet the following qualifications:

- For undergraduates, completion of ten semester-credits or fifteen quarter-credits in political science, including at least one upper-division course, with an average grade of B or higher in all political science courses, and an overall GPA placing the student in the top one-third of his or her class. Individual chapters may raise the eligibility threshold; they may not lower it.
- For graduate students, completion of nine graduate credits in political science with no grade lower than a B in those courses.

Faculty in political science departments where chapters are located are automatically eligible for membership in the honor society. Honorary membership is intended for persons of recognized ability and achievement in the field of political science. No more than two such honorary members may be elected by a local chapter in any one year. Election to membership may be based solely on stated criteria and is irrespective of membership in an affiliation with any other organization or group. Chapters may not discriminate on any basis prohibited by law. Membership, once conferred, is for life.

The lifetime national membership fee is $35.00. Individual chapters sometimes collect additional money from each initiate to use for their own chapter programs. The initiation fee is the only payment members ever make to the national office of the honor society. There are no annual dues.

== Governance ==
Pi Sigma Alpha is governed by an elected Executive Council, which acts as its board of directors. The Council includes the President, the President-elect, the Treasurer, the two most recent past presidents, the Pi Sigma Alpha Undergraduate Journal of Politics faculty advisor, the Executive Director, and twelve other members at large. Six of these are elected every two years to serve four-year terms. Members of the Council are almost always faculty of recognized distinction in the field of political science, or of proven leadership to the honor society. Elections take place in even numbered years at the Biennial Business Meeting of the honor society.

== Programs ==
Pi Sigma Alpha has programs to benefit its student members and their chapters, and the profession of political science. Programs for chapters and members include an annual Chapter Activity Grants competition, Best Undergraduate Class Paper and Best Undergraduate Honors Thesis awards, Scholarships for Graduate Study in Political Science, Scholarships for Washington Internships, Best Chapter awards, and Chapter Advisor Recognition awards. The organization hosts a National Undergraduate Research Conference each year in Washington, DC. For the profession of political science, Pi Sigma Alpha sponsors major speakers at the annual meetings of the American Political Science Association (APSA), as well as student research awards and travel grants for the APSA Annual Meeting and the regional political science association annual meetings.

== Publications ==
Pi Sigma Alpha publishes the Pi Sigma Alpha Undergraduate Journal of Politics twice per year. It is hosted by the Sigma Upsilon chapter at Elon University.
