= Alpha Phi Sigma =

International criminal justice honor society

- ΑΦΣ
- Founded: January 1942; 84 years ago Washington State University
- Type: Honor
- Affiliation: ACHS
- Status: Active
- Emphasis: Criminal Justice
- Scope: International
- Motto: "To Honor and Promote Academic Excellence; Community Service; Educational Leadership and Unity"
- Colors: Blue and Gold
- Symbol: Scales of Justice
- Publication: The Docket
- Chapters: 550
- Headquarters: PO Box 292405; Davie, Florida 33329; United States
- Website: www.alphaphisigma.org

Alpha Phi Sigma (ΑΦΣ) (Phi is pronounced "fi") is a North American Criminal Justice Honor Society. The society was established at Washington State University in 1942. It is a member of the Association of College Honor Societies.

== History ==
Alpha Phi Sigma was established in January 1942 at Washington State University by Vivian Anderson Leonard, director of the police science academic program, and seventeen students. It was created as an honor society to recognized scholarship and academic performance. Its first president was Glenn Hill, who drafter the society's constitution and bylaws.

By 1976, the society had chartered fourteen chapters. The executive board of the Academy of Criminal Justice Sciences voted to designate Alpha Phi Sigma as the National Criminal Justice Honor Society at a meeting on March 24, 1976.

Alpha Phi Sigma was admitted into the Association of College Honor Societies (ACHS) in 1981. By 2012, it had 425 active chapters and 102,175 members. As of 2024, it has charted over 550 chapters.

Its national headquarters is located at Nova Southeastern University in Fort Lauderdale, Florida.

== Symbols ==
Alpha Phi Sigma's motto is "To Honor and Promote Academic Excellence; Community Service; Educational Leadership and Unity". Its symbols in the scales of justice. Its colors are blue and gold. The society's newsletter is called The Docket.

== Membership ==
There are several requirements for becoming a member of Alpha Phi Sigma.

Undergraduate students shall be enrolled at the time of application in the institution represented by the chapter, have declared a major, minor or equivalent in the criminal justice or related field, have completed three full-time semesters or its equivalent, have a minimum GPA of 3.2 on a 4.0 scale, with a minimum GPA of 3.2 in courses in criminal justice related fields and rank in the top 35% of their class. A minimum of four courses of the above course work shall be in the criminal justice field.

Masters students shall be enrolled at the time of application in a Master's program in the Criminal Justice field in the institution represented by the chapter; have completed four courses, have a minimum GPA of 3.4 on a 4.0 scale. Up to three undergraduate courses in Criminal Justice may be used to satisfy the four-course requirement. These courses must equate to a 3.4 GPA or higher, and the cumulative undergraduate degree program GPA is a 3.2 or higher. In addition, all Masters level coursework must equate to a 3.4 GPA or higher at the institution in which the student is enrolled.

Doctoral Students shall be enrolled at the time of application in a Ph.D. program in the Criminal Justice/ related field in the institution represented by the chapter; have completed four courses, have a minimum GPA of 3.6 on a 4.0 scale. Up to three Masters courses in Criminal Justice may be used to satisfy the four-course requirement. These courses must equate to a 3.6 GPA or higher, and the cumulative master's degree program GPA is a 3.4 or higher. In addition, any Ph.D. level coursework must equate to a 3.6 GPA or higher at the institution in which the student is enrolled.

Law School Students must have completed their first academic semester, with a grade point average of 2.5 or higher, on a 4.0 scale.

== Chapters ==
As of 2024, Alpha Chi Sigma has charted over 550 chapters.

== See also ==
- Honor society
- Professional fraternities and sororities
