= Alpha Pi Mu =

American honor society for industrial engineering

- ΑΠΜ
- Founded: December 1, 1949; 75 years ago Georgia Tech
- Type: Honor
- Affiliation: ACHS
- Status: Active
- Emphasis: Industrial Engineering
- Scope: National
- Motto: "Humble service to humanity is the goal of the true engineer"
- Colors: Purple and Light Yellow
- Chapters: 68
- Members: 47,000+ lifetime
- Headquarters: 1309 Panorama Circle; Salem, Virginia 24153; United States
- Website: www.alphapimu.com

Alpha Pi Mu (ΑΠΜ) is an American honor society for Industrial and Systems Engineering students. All chapters are based in the United States, with the exception of one university in Puerto Rico which is an unincorporated territory of the United States.

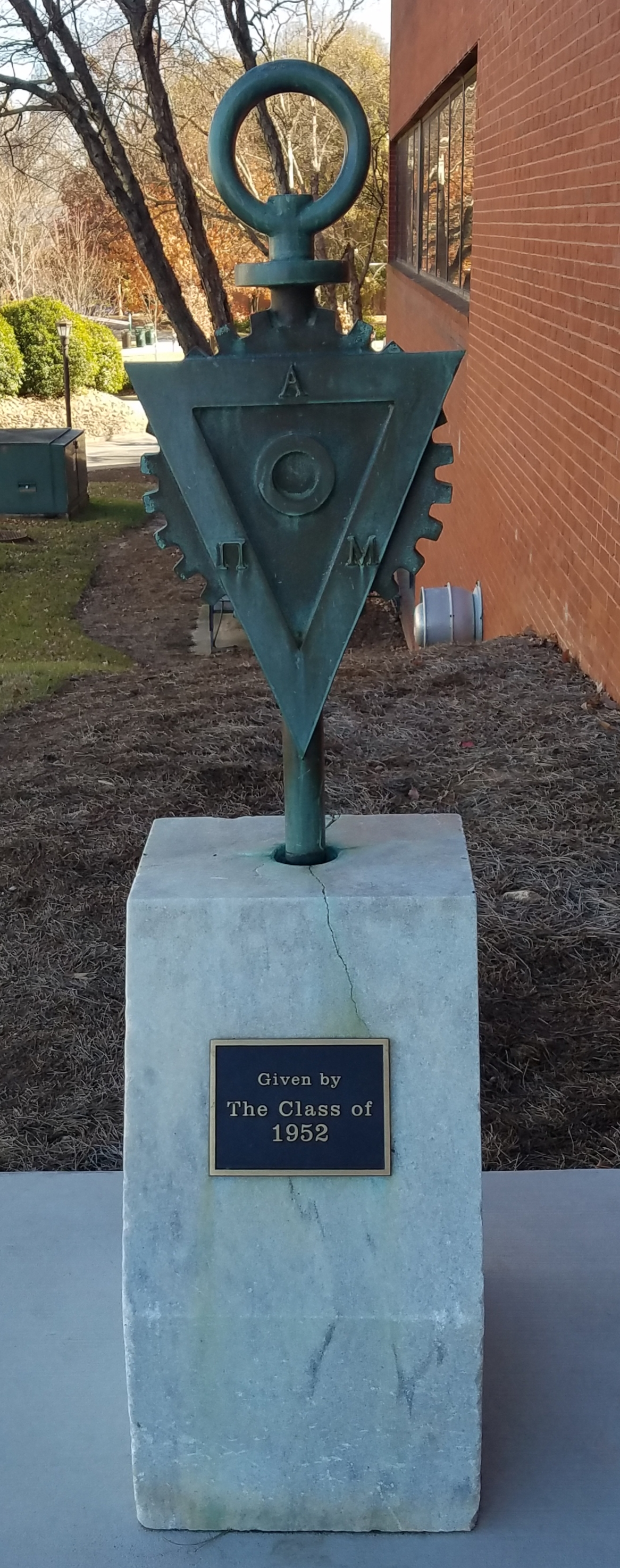
Alpha Pi Mu marker at the Georgia Institute of Technology

== History ==
The founder of Alpha Pi Mu was James T. French, who in 1949 was a senior industrial engineering student at Georgia Tech. He recruited nine men that were members of the Georgia Tech chapter of Tau Beta Pi as the first members of Alpha Pi Mu. Alpha Pi Mu is the only nationally accepted industrial engineering honor society. The Georgia Tech engineers who led the initial developmental work wanted an organization to provide a common ground "on which their outstanding young engineers could exchange ideas," and to provide experiences which could help their future professional development.

The Alpha Pi Mu Honor Society aims to:

Confer recognition upon students of Industrial and Systems Engineering who have shown exceptional academic interest and abilities in their field, encourage the advancement and quality of Industrial and Systems Engineering education, unify the student body of the Industrial Engineering department in presenting its needs and ideals to the faculty.

Alpha Pi Mu became a member of the Association of College Honor Societies in 1952. The society has 68 chapters that have initiated more than 47,095 members as of 2014.

== Symbols ==
French chose the Greek letter name Alpha Pi Mu to represent the three major areas of Industrial Engineering at the time: Administration, Production, and Methods. The society's motto is "Humble service to humanity is the goal of the true engineer".

The society's colors are purple and light yellow. Its stole is white with an embroidered logo.

== Activities ==
The society provides $1,000 scholarships to outstanding members. Its members also participate in activities that improve their campus and the profession.

== Membership ==
Students of Industrial and Systems Engineering programs who rank in the upper one-third of the senior Industrial and Systems Engineering class and the upper one-fifth of the junior Industrial and Systems Engineering class are considered for membership on the basis of leadership, ethics, sociability, character, and breadth of interest. Graduate students and alumni may be elected to membership if they meet the requirements. Faculty members and professional industrial and systems engineers may be elected to faculty and honorary membership respectively have proven themselves outstanding professionals in the field. Around 940 members are initiated each year.

== Chapters ==
The Society has established 68 chapters since 1949.
