= Pi Omega Pi =

American business honor society

- ΠΩΠ
- Founded: June 13, 1923; 103 years ago Northeast Missouri State Teachers College
- Type: Honor
- Affiliation: ACHS
- Status: Active
- Emphasis: Business education
- Scope: National
- Colors: Blue, Silver, and Gold
- Symbol: Lamb of Learning
- Flower: Red rose
- Patron Greek deity: Hermes
- Publication: Here and There
- Chapters: 20
- Members: 55,000 lifetime
- Headquarters: c/o Dr. Tamra Davis; Illinois State University; 410 S University Street; Normal, Illinois 61761; United States
- Website: www.piomegapi.com

Pi Omega Pi (ΠΩΠ) is an American scholastic honor society recognizing academic achievement among students in the field of business education.

== History ==
Pi Omega Pi was established by Dr. F. O. Selby of the department of business education at Northeast Missouri State Teachers College in Kirksville, Missouri. On June 13, 1923, the society held its initiation. Its founding members were:

- Isabelle Baker
- Hazel E. Brong
- William F. Clark
- Winifred Marie Conner
- Vera Dolan
- Gertrude Vogel Holloway
- Clara Marie Husted
- Grace Loughead
- Edwin D. Myers
- Getha Pickens
- Glenn E. Richards
- Virginia Romans
- Paul O. Selby
- Wyna M. Snyder
- Pauline Swanson

Northeast Missouri State Teachers College became the Alpha chapter. Beta chapter was created at Northwest Missouri State University in 1924, followed by Gamma at Iowa State University in 1925, Delta at Nebraska State in 1927, and Epsilon at the University of Iowa in 1927. Alpha governed the society for four years.

On December 29, 1927, the five chapters met under the leadership of Selby as temporary chair to formalize the national organization. Each chapter selected two delegates to create a constitution. Selby was elected the group's first national president.

Its newsletter, Here and There, was first published in 1946. Pi Omega Pi was admitted to the Association of College Honor Societies in 1965.

== Symbols ==
Member Edwin Myers designed the society's badge. It is a gold key with the Greek letters ΠΩΠ arranged horizontally, with lamb of learning above. The society's colors are blue, silver, and gold. Its flower is the red rose. Hermes, the Greek god of commerce, is its patron divinity.

== Membership ==
Pi Omega Pi member types include active, associate, alumni, honorary, and faculty. Active members are undergraduate and graduate students who are currently enrolled in a college or university.

To be eligible for membership, a student must intend to become a teacher of business subjects, have completed three semesters with at least 15 hours in business and education, and be ranked in the upper 35% of their college class with a GPA of B or higher.

== Governance ==
Pi Omega Pi is overseen by a National Council and by delegates who meet at National Conventions.

== Chapters ==
Pi Omega Pi honor society has twenty active chapters in the United States.

== Notable members ==
=== Honorary members ===
- Hamden L. Forkner, educator and writer who created Future Business Leaders of America
- Ellis Jones, sociologist whose research focused on ethical consumerism, corporate social responsibility, and lifestyle movements

== See also ==
- Professional fraternities and sororities
- Honor Cords
