= Association of College Honor Societies =

Organization that regulates collegiate honor societies

- ACHS
- Founded: December 30, 1925; 100 years ago
- Type: Umbrella
- Affiliation: Independent
- Status: Active
- Emphasis: Honor societies
- Scope: North America
- Members: 65 societies active
- Headquarters: 30 North Gould Street #29147; Sheridan, Wyoming; United States
- Website: www.achshonor.org

The Association of College Honor Societies (ACHS) is a voluntary association of national collegiate and post-graduate honor societies. It was established on December 30, 1925, by six organizations: Alpha Omega Alpha, the Order of the Coif, Phi Beta Kappa, Phi Kappa Phi, Sigma Xi, and Tau Beta Pi.

== History ==
The Association of College Honor Societies (ACHS) was formed in 1925 to create a network of affiliated societies and promote standards for scholarship and leadership on campus. The founding societies intended to establish and maintain desirable standards for groups wishing to call themselves honor societies. These standards included criteria for membership, governance, and chapter operation.

Representatives of Alpha Omega Alpha, the Order of the Coif, Phi Beta Kappa, and Sigma Xi attended its preliminary meeting held on October 2, 1925. When ACHS was officially established on December 30, 1925, its founding members were Alpha Omega Alpha, the Order of the Coif, Phi Beta Kappa, Phi Kappa Phi, Sigma Xi, and Tau Beta Pi. They were joined by Omicron Delta Kappa and Sigma Tau in March 1930. The organization's first president was Francis W. Shepardson of Phi Beta Kappa.

Since then, more than 65 honors societies have joined ACHS, becoming an international organization. However, not all legitimate honor societies apply for membership in ACHS. ACHS coordinates member organizations and facilitates communications between them. It also provides both scholarships to members of its member organizations.

The honor society standards set by the Association of College Honor Societies are mentioned by the U.S. government's Office of Personnel Management for entry into government employment at the GS-7 Level: "Applicants can be considered eligible based on membership in one of the national scholastic honor societies listed... by the Association of College Honor Societies. Agencies considering eligibility based on any society not included in the following list must ensure that the honor society meets the minimum requirements of the Association of College Honor Societies."

In 2024, ACHS had 65 active member societies located in North America. Its headquarters are at 30 North Gould Street #29147 in Sheridan, Wyoming.

== List of member organizations ==
As of 2026, 68 organizations are affiliated with the ACHS.

Society	Greek letters	Discipline	Founded	Joined ACHS	References
Alpha Beta Gamma	ΑΒΓ	Business and Professional Studies	1970	1996	
Alpha Chi	ΑΧ	All Academic Fields	February 22, 1922	February 1955	
Alpha Epsilon	ΑΕ	Agricultural, Food, and Biological Engineering	May 14, 1959	1968 (Associate); 1970 (Full)	
Alpha Epsilon Delta	ΑΕΔ	Premedical	April 28, 1926	April 22, 1945	
Alpha Epsilon Rho	ΑΕΡ	Electronic Media	April 30, 1943	2009	(Note: Founded as Beta Epsilon Phi on December 1, 1941.)
Alpha Eta Mu Beta	ΑΗΜΒ	Biomedical Engineering and Bioengineering	March 15, 1979	2013	
Alpha Iota Delta	ΑΙΔ	Decision, Information, and Operations Sciences	1971	2009	
Alpha Kappa Delta	ΑΚΔ	Sociology	November 21, 1920	1967	
Alpha Kappa Mu	ΑΚΜ	General Scholarship	November 26, 1937	1952	
Alpha Lambda Delta	ΑΛΔ	First-year Success/Freshmen	May 31, 1924	1939	
Alpha Phi Sigma	ΑΦΣ	Criminal Justice	January 1942	1981	
Alpha Pi Mu	ΑΠΜ	Industrial Engineering	January 5, 1949	February 1952 (Associate); February 1959 (Full)	
Alpha Sigma Lambda	ΑΣΛ	Continuing Education and Lifelong Learning	1946	2011	
Alpha Sigma Mu	ΑΣΜ	Materials Science and Engineering	January 1932	1965	
Alpha Sigma Nu	ΑΣΝ	General Scholarship - Jesuit Institutions of Higher Education	June 4, 1915	1975	(Note: Merged with Gamma Pi Epsilon March 30, 1973.)
Beta Gamma Sigma	ΒΓΣ	Business and Management	February 19, 1913	February 27, 1937; 1990 (Readmitted)	
Beta Kappa Chi	ΒΚΧ	Natural Sciences and Mathematics	January 31, 1923	1961	
Beta Phi Mu	ΒΦΜ	Library and Information Studies and Information Technology	August 1948	1969	
Chi Alpha Sigma	ΧΑΣ	Athletics	May 17, 1996	2024	
Chi Epsilon	ΧΕ	Civil Engineering	May 20, 1922	2025	
Chi Sigma Iota	ΧΣΙ	Counseling	January 1, 1985	2001	
Delta Epsilon Sigma	ΔΕΣ	General Scholarship in Colleges and Universities with a Catholic Tradition	April 13, 1939	1967	
Delta Mu Delta	ΔΜΔ	Business Administration	November 18, 1913	1963	
Epsilon Mu Eta	ΕΜΗ	Engineering Technology	2003	2025	
Epsilon Pi Phi	ΕΠΦ	Emergency Management	2006	2017	
Epsilon Pi Tau	ΕΠΤ	Professions in Technology	March 13, 1929	2005	
Gamma Theta Upsilon	ΓΘΥ	Geography	May 15, 1931	1976	
Kappa Mu Epsilon	ΚΜΕ	Mathematics	April 18, 1931	1968	
Kappa Omicron Nu	ΚΟΝ	Human Sciences	February 21, 1990	February 25, 1951	(Note: Kappa Omicron Nu founded in 1990 through consolidation of Omicron Nu (founded April 1912) and Kappa Omicron Phi (founded December 11, 1922)). (Omicron Nu admitted to ACHS 1951, readmitted 1968, Kappa Omicron Phi admitted 1972))
Kappa Tau Alpha	ΚΤΑ	Journalism and Mass Communication	March 10, 1910	February 25, 1951	
Lambda Pi Eta	ΛΠΗ	Communication	1985	February 1996	
Lambda Sigma	ΛΣ	Student Leadership, Scholarship and Service	November 7, 1922	1981	(Note: November 7, 1922 as Cwens, March 6, 1976 as Lambda Sigma)
Mortar Board		Scholarship, Leadership, and Service	February 15, 1918	February 27, 1937	
Mu Kappa Tau	ΜΚΤ	Marketing	1966	1996	
National Society of Collegiate Scholars		Scholarship, Leadership, and Service	April 30, 1994	2004	
Omega Chi Epsilon	ΩΧΕ	Chemical Engineering	Spring 1931	1967	
Omega Rho	ΩΡ	Operations Research, and Management Science	April 1, 1976	1983 (Associate); 1986 (Full)	
Omicron Delta Epsilon	ΟΔΕ	Economics	January 1, 1963	1965-1973; 1981 (Readmitted)	
Phi Alpha Honor Society	ΦΑ	Social Work	1962	February 14, 2019	
Phi Alpha Theta	ΦΑΘ	History	March 17, 1921	April 22, 1945 –2012; 2017 (Readmitted)	
Phi Beta Delta	ΦΒΔ	International Education	February 27, 1986	2013	
Phi Eta Sigma	ΦΗΣ	Freshman Scholarship	March 22, 1923	February 27, 1937 – 2011; 2018 (Readmitted)	
Phi Sigma	ΦΣ	Biological Sciences, All Pure and Applied Fields	March 17, 1915	1950	
Phi Sigma Iota	ΦΣΙ	Foreign Language, Literature, and Cultures	October 1922	1950	
Phi Sigma Tau	ΦΣΤ	Philosophy	October 21, 1955	1958	
Phi Upsilon Omicron	ΦΥΟ	Family and Consumer Sciences	February 10, 1909	1979	
Pi Delta Phi	ΠΔΦ	French	1906	1967	
Pi Gamma Mu	ΠΓΜ	Social Sciences	December 1, 1924	1953	
Pi Kappa Lambda	ΠΚΛ	Music	May 17, 1918	February 24, 1940	
Pi Sigma Alpha	ΠΣΑ	Political Science	October 1, 1920	1949	
Pi Tau Sigma	ΠΤΣ	Mechanical Engineering	March 16, 1915	March 1, 1947	
Pi Theta Epsilon	ΠΘΕ	Occupational Therapy	1959	February 1996	
Psi Beta	ΨΒ	Psychology at Two-Year Colleges	November 5, 1981	1994	
Psi Chi	ΨΧ	Psychology	September 4, 1929	1965	
Rho Chi	ΡΧ	Pharmacy	May 19, 1922	March 1, 1947	
Sigma Beta Delta	ΣΒΔ	Business, Management, and Administration	January 16, 1994	1994	
Sigma Delta Pi	ΣΔΠ	Spanish	November 14, 1919	1966	
Sigma Lambda Alpha	ΣΛΑ	Landscape Architecture	September 24, 1977	1983 (Associate); 1986 (Full)	
Sigma Lambda Chi	ΣΛΧ	Construction Management Technology	April 30, 1949	1991	
Sigma Pi Sigma	ΣΠΣ	Physics and Astronomy	December 11, 1921	1945	
Sigma Tau Delta	ΣΤΔ	English Language and Literature	December 12, 1922	1972	
Sigma Theta Tau	ΣΘΤ	Nursing	October 4, 1922	1959	
Tau Alpha Pi	ΤΑΠ	Engineering Technology	1953	2000-2023; 2025	
Tau Beta Pi	ΤΒΠ	Engineering	June 15, 1885	December 30, 1925	(Note: Association of College Honor Societies founding organization.)
Tau Sigma Delta	ΤΣΔ	Architecture and Allied Arts	May 1913	February 28, 1948	
Theta Alpha Kappa	ΘΑΚ	Religious Studies and Theology	Fall 1976	1985 (Associate); 1986 (Full)	
Upsilon Pi Epsilon	ΥΠΕ	Computing and Information Disciplines	January 10, 1967	1997	
Xi Sigma Pi	ΞΣΠ	Forestry	November 24, 1908	1966–1999; 2017 (Readmitted)	

== Former members ==
While the Association of College Honor Societies remains the largest trade association of honor societies, some former members have resigned from ACHS membership to operate independently. Of these, several have emerged into successor groups that remain part of the ACHS or have gone dormant.

Recently, four of the oldest independent honor societies, including three of the original six founding members of the ACHS, have formed a new coordinating organization called the Honor Society Caucus.

Society	Greek letters	Discipline	Founded	Joined ACHS	Left ACHS	Status	References
Alpha Delta Mu	ΑΔΜ	Social Work	Fall 1976	1983 (Associate); 1986 (Full)	February 9, 2007	Independent	
Alpha Omega Alpha	ΑΩΑ	Medical	August 25, 1902	December 30, 1925	1977–1998	Independent	(Note: Association of College Honor Societies founding organization.)
Chi Epsilon	ΧΕ	Civil Engineering	May 22, 1922	1953	2023	Independent	(Note: Founded by two groups of civil engineering students at the University of Illinois in 1922.)
Delta Phi Delta	ΔΦΔ	Art	January 10, 1909	1961	1977–1988	Independent	(Note: Founded as Pallet Club at U of Kansas on January 10, 1909. On May 28, 1912, plans for a national organization were completed, Delta Phi Delta was adopted as the name)
Delta Sigma Rho	ΔΣΡ	Forensics	April 13, 1906	February 1955	August 18, 1963	Merged into Delta Sigma Rho-Tau Kappa Alpha	(Note: Delta Sigma Rho and Tau Kappa Alpha merged on August 18, 1963, to form Delta Sigma Rho-Tau Kappa Alpha.)
Delta Sigma Rho-Tau Kappa Alpha	ΔΣΡ-ΤΚΑ	Forensics	August 18, 1963	February 27, 1937 (ΤΚΑ); February 1955 (ΔΣΡ)	November 2013–January 2014	Independent	
Delta Tau Alpha	ΔΤΑ	Agriculture	March 19, 1960	1992	2023		
Eta Kappa Nu	ΗΚΝ	Electrical and Computer Engineering	October 28, 1904	March 1, 1947	2008	Independent	
Golden Key		General	November 29, 1977	2005	December 31, 2013	Independent	
Iota Sigma Pi	ΙΣΠ	Women in the sciences, especially chemistry	1900 or 1902	February 1955	1957–1963	Independent	
Kappa Delta Pi	ΚΔΠ	Education	March 8, 1911	1974	2008	Independent	
Lambda Iota Tau	ΛΙΤ	Literature of all Languages	December 3, 1953	1965	2015	Merged with Sigma Tau Delta	
National Collegiate Players/Pi Epsilon Delta	ΠΕΔ	Theatre Honors	June 8, 1919	1963	1977–1988	Independent	
Omicron Delta Kappa	ΟΔΚ	Leadership and Scholarship	December 3, 1914	March 3, 1930	2005	Honor Society Caucus	
Omicron Nu	ΟΝ	Human Sciences	April 23, 1912	February 25, 1951; 1968 (Readmitted)	1990	Merged into Kappa Omicron Nu	
Order of the Coif		Law	1902	December 30, 1925	1947–1957	Independent	
Phi Beta Kappa	ΦΒΚ	Liberal Arts	December 5, 1776	December 30, 1925	December 15, 1937	Honor Society Caucus	
Phi Kappa Phi	ΦΚΦ	All Fields	March 15, 1897	December 30, 1925	2006–2007	Honor Society Caucus	
Phi Lambda Sigma	ΦΛΣ	Pharmacy Leadership	March 1965	2018	2025		
Pi Alpha Alpha	ΠΑΑ	Public Affairs and Administration	1974	1983 (Associate); 1984 (Full)	2017	Independent	
Pi Omega Pi	ΠΩΠ	Business Education Teachers	June 13, 1923	1965	2023		
Scabbard and Blade, National Society of		Reserve Officer Training Corps	Fall 1904	2010	2022	Independent	
Sigma Gamma Tau	ΣΓΤ	Aerospace Engineering	February 28, 1953	February 27, 1965	2001	Independent	
Sigma Tau	ΣΤ	Engineering	February 24, 1904	March 3, 1930	1963	Merged into Tau Beta Pi	(Note: Merged with Tau Beta Pi in 1974.)
Sigma Xi	ΣΞ	Scientific Research	November 1886	December 30, 1925	1933	Honor Society Caucus	
Tau Kappa Alpha	ΤΚΑ	Forensics	May 13, 1908	February 27, 1937	August 18, 1963	Merged into Delta Sigma Rho-Tau Kappa Alpha	

== See also ==
- Honor society
- Olivaint Conference of Belgium
