= Alpha Epsilon =

American honor society for agricultural engineering

- ΑΕ
- Founded: May 14, 1959; 67 years ago University of Missouri
- Type: Honor
- Affiliation: ACHS
- Status: Active
- Emphasis: Agricultural, Food, and Biological Engineering
- Scope: National
- Colors: Black and Gold
- Symbol: Horn of Plenty, Plow, T-square and Compass
- Chapters: 30 active
- Members: 8,200+ lifetime
- Headquarters: c/o ASABE; 2950 Niles Road; St. Joseph, Michigan 49085; United States
- Website: Alpha Epsilon Honor Society homepage

Alpha Epsilon (ΑΕ) is a scholastic honor society recognizing academic achievement among students in the fields of agricultural, food, and biological engineering. It has thirty active chapters across the United States and a total membership of more than 8,200.

== History ==
Alpha Epsilon Honor Society was founded at the University of Missouri on May 14, 1959, to recognize academic achievement among students in the field of Agricultural Engineering. The purpose of the society, as outlined in 1959 is:

To promote the high ideals of the engineering profession, to give recognition to those agricultural engineers who manifest worthy qualities of character, scholarship, and professional attainment, and to encourage and support such improvements in the agricultural engineering profession to make it an instrument of greater service to mankind.

It began steady expansion immediately, adding chapters at the University of Illinois, University of Minnesota, University of Arkansas, Purdue University and Virginia Tech. The first six chapters met to formally adopt a national constitution and bylaws four years after its founding, on December 11, 1963. While the Society's initial focus was Agricultural Engineering, this was later expanded to include Food Engineering, and Biological Engineering.

Alpha Epsilon was admitted as an associate member of the Association of College Honor Societies in 1968, with full membership achieved in 1970. By 2012, it had 17 active chapters, 148 active members, and 8,144 total initiates.

The society meets annually in conjunction with the American Society of Agricultural and Biological Engineers (ASABE). The two organizations cooperate but are managed by two separate executive boards. They share a website and physical mailing address.

== Symbols ==
Alpha Epsilon's crest is in the form of a shield with a banner displaying the name of the society, "Alpha Epsilon," The shield is further decorated with three symbols, the Horn of Plenty, a plow, and a T-square and a compass. These symbols represent the place of agricultural engineering in the production of food and fiber. At the top of the shield is the center portion of the key with the Greek letters Α and Ε.

Alpha Epsilon's colors are black and gold. Its badge is a key, etched in the back with the name of the owner, the name of the chapter, and the year of the member's initiation. The motto of the society is not public.

== Governance ==
Chapters are fairly autonomous and allowed to manage their activity broadly. One commonality that is shared by many groups is the provision of tutoring services to students in the Agricultural sciences.

== Membership ==
Membership is open to upperclassmen and graduate students of agricultural and biological engineering. Membership selection is based on character, leadership, and scholarship. Prospective members are juniors in the upper quarter of their class, seniors in the upper third of their class, or graduate students who met eligibility as an undergraduate or who have at least a 3.25 GPA after completing seven hours.

Alpha Epsilon has three types of members, active, alumni, and honorary.

== Chapters ==
This is a list of Alpha Epsilon chapters, with active chapters indicated in bold and inactive chapters in italics.

Number	Chapter	Charter date and range	Institution	Location	Status	Ref.
1.	**Missouri Alpha**	1959	University of Missouri	Columbia, Missouri	Active	
	Beta				Unassigned	(Note: Neither Baird's nor the online chapter list notes the use of a Beta chapter designation.)
2.	**Minnesota Gamma**	1960	University of Minnesota	St. Paul, Minnesota	Active	
3.	**Illinois Delta**	1960	University of Illinois	Urbana, Illinois	Active	
4.	**Arkansas Epsilon**	1961	University of Arkansas	Fayetteville, Arkansas	Active	
5.	**Indiana Zeta**	1962	Purdue University	West Lafayette, Indiana	Active	
6.	**Virginia Eta**	1963	Virginia Tech	Blacksburg, Virginia	Active	
7.	**North Dakota Theta**	1964	North Dakota State University	Fargo, North Dakota	Active	
8.	**Ohio Iota**	1965	Ohio State University	Columbus, Ohio	Active	
9.	**South Dakota Kappa**	1966	South Dakota State University	Brookings, South Dakota	Active	
10.	**Nebraska Lambda**	1966	University of Nebraska	Lincoln, Nebraska	Active	
11.	**North Carolina Mu**	1966	North Carolina State University	Raleigh, North Carolina	Active	
12.	**Colorado Nu**	1969	Colorado State University	Fort Collins, Colorado	Active	
13.	Texas Xi	1969–xxxx ?	University of Texas	Austin, Texas	Inactive	
14.	**Pennsylvania Omicron**	1970	Penn State University	State College, Pennsylvania	Active	
15.	**Iowa Pi**	1971	Iowa State University	Ames, Iowa	Active	
16.	West Virginia Rho	1971–xxxx ?	West Virginia University	Morgantown, West Virginia	Inactive	
17.	**Michigan Sigma**	1973	Michigan State University	East Lansing, Michigan	Active	
18.	**Wisconsin Tau**	1974	University of Wisconsin	Madison, Wisconsin	Active	
19.	**Oregon Upsilon**	1976	Oregon State University	Corvallis, Oregon	Active	
20.	**Texas (A&M) Phi**	1976	Texas A&M University	College Station, Texas	Active	
21.	**California (Davis) Chi**	1976	University of California, Davis	Davis, California	Active	
22.	**Maryland Psi**	1977	University of Maryland	College Park, Maryland	Active	
23.	**Kentucky Omega**	1977	University of Kentucky	Lexington, Kentucky	Active	
X.	Alpha Beta				Unassigned	(Note: Neither Baird's nor the online chapter list notes the use of an Alpha Beta chapter designation)
X.	Beta Beta				Unassigned	(Note: Neither Baird's nor the online chapter list notes the use of a Beta Beta chapter designation)
24.	**Florida Gamma Beta**	1979	University of Florida	Gainesville, Florida	Active	
25.	**Alabama Delta Beta**	1980	Auburn University	Auburn, Alabama	Active	
26.	**Oklahoma Epsilon Beta**	1981	Oklahoma State University	Stillwater, Oklahoma	Active	
27.	**Kansas Zeta Beta**	1983	Kansas State University	Manhattan, Kansas	Active	
28.	**Arizona Eta Beta**	1986	University of Arizona	Tucson, Arizona	Active	
29.	**North Carolina Theta Beta**	1996	North Carolina A&T State University	Greensboro, North Carolina	Active	
30.	**New York Iota Beta**	1998	Cornell University	Ithaca, New York	Active	
31.	**Florida (A&M) Kappa Beta**	19xx ?	Florida A&M University	Tallahassee, Florida	Active	

== See also ==
- Association of College Honor Societies
