= American Society for Engineering Management =

International professional society

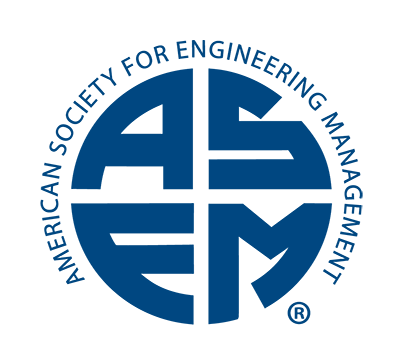
- Successor: Originated from Missouri University of Science & Technology
- Founded: 1979
- Type: Professional Organization
- Legal status: 501(c)(6)
- Purpose: Engineering Management
- Location: Huntsville, Alabama, USA (headquarters)
- Region served: Worldwide
- Members: Approximately 1,000
- Key people: Dr. Gana Natarajan, PhD, CPEM, F.ASEM (current president)
- Website: www.asem.org

The American Society for Engineering Management (ASEM) is an international professional society that is focused on promoting and advancing the field of Engineering Management. The subject of Engineering Management is concerned with the management of people and projects in a technological or engineering systems context. The successful engineering manager will have the ability to manage complex programs and systems while drawing on the tools and techniques developed within the field of Engineering Management.

== History ==
The first Engineering Management academic program was launched at the University of Missouri – Rolla (now called Missouri University of Science and Technology) in the mid-1960s. A number of years later in 1979, the American Society for Engineering Management (ASEM) was founded by Professor Bernard R. Sarchet, who held the first Chair of the Engineering Management Department at Missouri S&T, with support provided by the university's Chancellor, Professor Merl Baker.

In recognition of Professor Sarchet's seminal impact on the field of Engineering Management, there are two prestigious awards named in his honor. These include the Bernard R. Sarchet Award in recognition for lifetime achievement in engineering management education, which is presented by the Engineering Management Division of ASEE and the Bernard R. Sarchet Award in recognition for advancement of the engineering management discipline, which is presented by ASEM.

== Publications ==
ASEM is responsible for a number of technical publications associated with the field of Engineering Management. This includes an academic journal (Engineering Management Journal) and practitioner focused publication (Practice Periodical) as well as the Guide to the Engineering Management Body of Knowledge (EMBoK) and Engineering Management Handbook.

== International Annual Conference ==
The ASEM International Annual Conference is held annually at different locations across the United States and includes research papers, workshops, student competitions, and other sessions related to the communication of knowledge concerned with both the academic and practitioner dimensions of Engineering Management.

== See also ==
- University of Colorado Engineering Management Program
- Accreditation Board for Engineering and Technology
- Larry Richards (former ASEM President, 1998–99)
