= Tau Alpha Pi =

American honor society for engineering technology

- ΤΑΠ
- Founded: 1953; 72 years ago Southern Polytechnic State University
- Type: Honor
- Affiliation: ACHS
- Status: Active
- Emphasis: Engineering Technology
- Scope: National
- Colors: Green and Gold
- Publication: Tau Alpha Pi Journal
- Chapters: 85
- Members: 850+ active 7,000+ lifetime
- Nickname: TAP
- Headquarters: c/o ASEE; 1818 N Street NW, Suite 600; Washington, D.C. 20036; United States
- Website: taualphapi.org

Tau Alpha Pi (ΤΑΠ) is a scholastic honor society that recognizes academic achievement among students in the field of engineering technology. Tau Alpha Pi honor society has 85 chapters across the United States and a total membership of approximately 7,000. It is one of the most selective honor societies in the United States, only inviting the top four percent of an institution's total engineering technology enrollment.

== History ==
The society was founded at Southern Polytechnic State University in 1953 by professor Jesse DeFore, head of the physics department at Southern Polytechnic State University.

The purpose of Tau Alpha Pi is twofold. First, to recognize high standards of scholarship among students in engineering technology programs. Secondly, to promote and encourage scholastic achievement by offering outstanding engineering technology students membership in the society. To allow members to succeed academically, the society keeps a list of scholarships on its website that members can apply to.

Tau Alpha Pi was managed for over thirty years by engineering technology educator Frederick J. Berger who saw it dramatically transform into a viable national honor society. The American Society for Engineering Education took over the management of Tau Alpha Pi in 1997 and presents a yearly award in Berger's name.

Tau Alpha Pi was admitted to the Association of College Honor Societies in 2000. As of 2012, it had 85 chapters across the United States and a total membership of approximately 7,000. Its headquarters is in Washington, D.C.

== Symbols ==
The colors of Tau Alpha Pi are green and gold. Its publication is the Tau Alpha Pi Journal.

== Activities ==
At the chapter level, members participate in tutoring in the community and on their campus and raise funds to purchase equipment for their campus.

== Membership ==
The society is open to associate and bachelor's degree candidates who are elected by the prospective chapter. Tau Alpha Pi is one of the most selective honor societies in the United States, only inviting the top four percent of an institution's total engineering technology enrollment. Potential members are in the top 25 percent of their class and have completed three academic semesters. Over 850 members are admitted to Tau Alpha Pi each year.

== Chapters ==
Tau Alpha Pi honor society has 85 chapters across the United States .

== See also ==
- Honor society
- Professional fraternities and sororities
