= Kappa Tau Alpha =

American honor society for journalism

- ΚΤΑ
- Founded: March 10, 1910; 115 years ago University of Missouri
- Type: Honor
- Affiliation: ACHS
- Status: Active
- Emphasis: Journalism and mass communication
- Scope: National
- Motto: "The Truth Will Prevail"
- Colors: Light blue and Gold
- Symbol: Key with a quill pen
- Publication: KTA Newsletter
- Chapters: 99
- Members: 1,248 active 64,974 lifetime
- Headquarters: c/o Dr. Beverly Horvit; School of Journalism; University of Missouri; Columbia, Missouri 65211-1200; United States
- Website: www.kappataualpha.org

Kappa Tau Alpha is an American college honor society which recognizes academic excellence and promotes scholarship in journalism and mass communication. Membership must be earned by excellence in academic work at one of the colleges and universities that have chapters.

== History ==
Kappa Tau Alpha was founded at the University of Missouri on March 10, 1910. Its purpose is to recognize and encourage excellent scholarship and professionalism in journalism and mass communication.

When Kappa Tau Alpha was founded it was limited to only men. However, the society lapsed during World War I and when it was reorganized after the war it was broadened to allow women students. It was admitted into the Association of College Honor Societies in 1951.

In May 2011, it had 94 active chapters, 1,248 collegiate members, and 64,974 total members. As of 2024, it has 99 active chapters.

== Symbols ==
Kappa Tau Alpha means "The Truth Will Prevail." Its Greek letter represent the words: knowledge, truth and accuracy. The society's colors are light blue, signifying truth; and gold, emblematic of worth and high standards. The emblem of Kappa Tau Alpha is the key, the oldest symbol of knowledge and communication, with a quill pen. Its publication is the KTA Newsletter.

== Membership ==
Juniors, seniors, and graduate students majoring in journalism or mass communication who are in the top ten percent of their class are eligible for membership. Membership is by invitation.

== Activities ==
Kappa Tau Alpha presents the AEJMC student awards for research papers and the Frank Luther Mott/Kappa Tau Alpha Award for best journalism or mass community research-based book. The society co-sponsors the Kappa Tau Alpha-AEJMC Awards luncheon at the annual convention of the Association for Education in Journalism and Mass Communication.

== Chapters ==
In 2024, Kappa Tau Alpha had 99 active chapters.
