= Sigma Lambda Chi =

American construction management honor society

- ΣΛΧ
- Founded: April 30, 1949; 77 years ago Michigan State University
- Type: Honor
- Affiliation: ACHS
- Status: Active
- Emphasis: Construction Management
- Scope: International
- Colors: Green and Gold
- Publication: Sigma Lambda Chi Newsletter
- Chapters: 73 active
- Members: 25,000+ lifetime
- Headquarters: P.O. Box 6383; Lafayette, Indiana 47903-6383; United States
- Website: www.slc-intl.org

Sigma Lambda Chi (ΣΛΧ) is an international scholastic honor society that recognizes academic achievement among students in the field of construction management. It was established in 1949 at Michigan State University. It is a member of the Association of College Honor Societies

== History ==
Sigma Lambda Chi International Construction Honor Society was founded at Michigan State University on April 30, 1949.

Sigma Lambda Chi honor society has chartered 93 chapters, and a total membership of approximately 25,000. It was admitted to the Association of College Honor Societies in 1991.

== Symbols ==
The colors of Sigma Lambda Chi are green and gold. Its publication is the Sigma Lambda Chi Newsletter.

The key of Sigma Lambda Chi bears its crest. In the top portion of the crest features trees which represent the natural resources used in construction. In the lower left corner of the creat are plans that symbolized the research and planning that is required in construction managements. There is a building in the lower right corner of the crest, representing the engineered facility and homes produced by construction.

== Activities ==
Chapters organize service activities for their communities and campuses. Chapters also sponsor scholarships for their campus and present awards to recognize students, faculty, and professionals in the construction industry. The society has an annual convention that is held in conjunction with the national conference of the Associated Schools of Construction.

== Chapters ==
Following is a list of Sigma Lambda Chi chapters. Active chapters are indicated in bold. Inactive chapters are in italics.

Chapter	Charter date and range	Institution	Location	Status	Ref.
**Alpha**	April 30, 1949 – xxxx ?; October 22, 2019	Michigan State University	East Lansing, Michigan	Active	
**Beta**		Virginia Tech	Blacksburg, Virginia	Active	
Gamma		University of Wisconsin–Madison	Madison, Wisconsin	Inactive	
Delta		University of Denver	Denver, Colorado	Inactive	
**Epsilon**	June 1, 1952	University of Florida	Gainesville, Florida	Active	
**Zeta**		Bradley University	Peoria, Illinois	Active	
**Eta**		Arizona State University	Tempe, Arizona	Active	
**Theta**		University of Washington	Seattle, Washington	Active	
**Iota**		Auburn University	Auburn, Alabama	Active	
**Kappa**		Colorado State University	Fort Collins, Colorado	Active	
Lambda				Unassigned	
**Mu**		Pittsburg State University	Pittsburg, Kansas	Active	
Nu		Hampton Institute	Hampton, Virginia	Inactive	
**Xi**		University of Louisiana at Monroe	Monroe, Louisiana	Active	
**Omicron**	Late 1960s	University of Nebraska–Lincoln	Lincoln, Nebraska	Active	
**Pi**		Kansas State University	Manhattan, Kansas	Active	
**Rho**		Iowa State University	Ames, Iowa	Active	
Sigma				Unassigned	
**Tau**		Clemson University	Clemson, South Carolina	Active	
**Upsilon**		Louisiana State University	Baton Rouge, Louisiana	Active	
**Phi**		California Polytechnic State University	San Luis Obispo, California	Active	
**Chi**		University of Minnesota		Active	
**Psi**		Purdue University	West Lafayette, Indiana	Active	
**Omega**		Florida International University	Miami, Florida	Active	
**Alpha II**	1975	University of Southern Mississippi	Hattiesburg, Mississippi	Active	
**Beta II**	1979	Montana State University	Bozeman, Montana	Active	
Gamma II		Indiana University–Purdue University Indianapolis	Indianapolis, Indiana	Inactive	(Note: In 2024, IUPUI split into two separate universities, Indiana University Indianapolis and Purdue University in Indianapolis.)
**Delta II**		Central Connecticut State University	New Britain, Connecticut	Active	
**Epsilon II**		University of Houston	Houston, Texas	Active	
**Zeta II**		Eastern Kentucky University	Richmond, Kentucky	Active	
**Eta II**		California State University, Fresno	Fresno, California	Active	
**Theta II**		Texas A&M University	College Station, Texas	Active	
**Iota II**		East Carolina University	Greenville, North Carolina	Active	
Kappa II		Fairleigh Dickinson University	Madison, New Jersey	Inactive	
Lambda II				Unassigned	
**Mu II**		Tuskegee University	Tuskegee, Alabama	Active	
**Nu II**		New York City College of Technology	Brooklyn, New York	Active	
Xi II		California State University, Long Beach	Long Beach, California	Inactive	
**Omicron II**		Ferris State University	Big Rapids, Michigan	Active	
**Pi II**		North Dakota State University	Fargo, North Dakota	Active	
**Rho II**		Kennesaw State University	Cobb County, Georgia	Active	
Sigma II				Unassigned	
**Tau II**		University of Maryland Eastern Shore	Princess Anne, Maryland	Active	
Upsilon II		Southern Illinois University Edwardsville	Edwardsville, Illinois	Inactive	
**Phi II**		State University of New York College of Environmental Science and Forestry	Syracuse, New York	Active	
**Chi II**		California State University, East Bay	Hayward, California	Active	
**Psi II**		Brigham Young University	Provo, Utah	Active	
**Omega II**		Ohio State University	Columbus, Ohio	Active	
Alpha III		New Jersey Institute of Technology	Newark, New Jersey	Inactive	
Beta III		Georgia Tech	Atlanta, Georgia	Inactive	
**Gamma III**		University of Texas at Tyler	Tyler, Texas	Active	
**Delta III**		Indiana State University	Terre Haute, Indiana	Active	
**Epsilon III**		University of Wisconsin–Stout	Menomonie, Wisconsin	Active	
Zeta III		Bowling Green State University	Bowling Green, Ohio	Inactive	
**Eta III**		University of Cincinnati	Cincinnati, Ohio	Active	
Theta III		Royal Melbourne Institute of Technology	Melbourne, Australia	Inactive	
Iota III		University of Northern Iowa	Cedar Falls, Iowa	Inactive	
Kappa III		University of Central Missouri	Warrensburg, Missouri	Inactive	
Lambda III				Unassigned	
**Mu III**		Southeast Missouri State University	Cape Girardeau, Missouri	Active	
**Nu III**		Texas State University	San Marcos, Texas	Active	
**Xi III**		Mississippi State University	Starkville, Mississippi	Active	
**Omicron III**		Florida Gulf Coast University	Fort Myers, Florida	Active	
Rho III				Unassigned ?	
Sigma III				Unassigned	
Tau III		University of Oklahoma	Norman, Oklahoma	Inactive	
Upsilon III				Unassigned ?	
**Phi III**		Roger Williams University	Bristol, Rhode Island	Active	
Chi III				Unassigned ?	
**Psi III**		Central Washington University	Ellensburg, Washington	Active	
**Omega III**		Pennsylvania College of Technology	Williamsport, Pennsylvania	Active	
Alpha IV				Unassigned ?	
**Beta IV**		Northern Arizona University	Flagstaff, Arizona	Active	
Gamma IV		Washington State University	Pullman, Washington	Inactive	
**Delta IV**	1999	University of Arkansas at Little Rock	Little Rock, Arkansas	Active	
**Epsilon IV**		Oklahoma State University–Stillwater	Stillwater, Oklahoma	Active	
**Zeta IV**		Milwaukee School of Engineering	Milwaukee, Wisconsin	Active	
**Eta IV**		Georgia Southern University	Statesboro, Georgia	Active	
Theta IV				Unassigned ?	
**Iota IV**		California State University, Chico	Chico, California	Active	
Kappa IV		North Carolina A&T State University	Greensboro, North Carolina	Inactive	
Lambda IV				Unassigned	
**Mu IV**		Boise State University	Boise, Idaho	Active	
**Nu IV**		University of North Florida	Jacksonville, Florida	Active	
**Xi IV**		Western Carolina University	Cullowhee, North Carolina	Active	
**Omicron IV**		Wentworth Institute of Technology	Boston, Massachusetts	Active	
**Pi IV**		South Dakota State University	Brookings, South Dakota	Active	
**Rho IV**		Weber State University	Ogden, Utah	Active	
Sigma IV				Unassigned	
**Tau IV**		Minnesota State University Moorhead	Moorhead, Minnesota	Active	
**Upsilon IV**		Missouri State University	Springfield, Missouri	Active	
**Phi IV**		Morehead State University	Morehead, Kentucky	Active	
Chi IV		Dublin Institute of Technology	Dublin, Ireland	Inactive	
**Psi IV**		Northern Kentucky University	Highland Heights, Kentucky	Active	
**Omega IV**		Drexel University	Philadelphia, Pennsylvania	Active	
**Alpha V**		University of Alaska Anchorage	Anchorage, Alaska	Active	
Beta V		Illinois State University	Normal, Illinois	Inactive	
Gamma V		Minnesota State University, Mankato	Mankato, Minnesota	Inactive	
**Delta V**		Ball State University	Muncie, Indiana	Active	
**Epsilon V**		University of Texas at San Antonio	San Antonio, Texas	Active	
**Zeta V**		Alfred State College	Alfred, New York	Active	
**Eta V**		Thomas Jefferson University	Philadelphia, Pennsylvania	Active	
**Theta V**		Norwich University	Northfield, Vermont	Active	
**Convention**		Sigma Lambda Chi International Convention		Active	
