= Phi Alpha Honor Society =

American honor society for social work students

- ΦΑ
- Founded: 1962; 64 years ago Michigan State University
- Type: Honor
- Affiliation: ACHS
- Status: Active
- Emphasis: Social Work
- Scope: North America
- Colors: Royal blue and light gold
- Chapters: 62 active
- Members: 124,250+ lifetime
- Headquarters: Phi Alpha Honor Society; East Tennessee State University; Johnson City, Tennessee 37614; United States
- Website: phialpha.org

Phi Alpha Honor Society (ΦΑ) is a North American honor society for social work students. It was established in 1962 at Michigan State University and has since chartered more than 470 chapters. Phi Alpha is a member of the Association of College Honor Societies.

== History ==
A group of undergraduate social work students at Michigan State University conceived of a national social work honor society in 1960. After investigating, they determined that local societies already existed at three other colleges. Michigan State, those three schools, and a few other schools formed a National Honor Society Committee in November 1960. This committee worked on the constitution and other administrative matters. The name Phi Alpha was chosen, since that was the name of the local chapter at Florida State University.

The formal organization and constitution were completed in 1962. Phi Alpha's charter chapters were Florida State University, Michigan State University, Ohio Northern University, Central State College, University of Dayton, and the University of Tennessee. Expansion of the honor society was limited to social work programs that were accredited by the Council on Social Work Education.

The purpose of Phi Alpha is "to promote fellowship among those dedicated to promotion of the humanitarian goals and ideals found in the social work profession, to foster high standards of education for social work, and to encourage scholarship and achievement in both the study and practice of social work."

By May 1964, it had thirteen chapters. Phi Alpha joined the Association of College Honor Societies on February 14, 2019. That year, it had 433 active chapters and 124,223 total initiates.

In October 2024, Phi Alpha had 339 chapters in the United States and Canada. It is a 501(c)(3) nonprofit organization. Its national headquarters is at East Tennessee State University in Johnson City, Tennessee.

== Symbols ==
Members of Phi Alpha receive a lapel pin and a certificate. Phi Alpha's members may wear its blue and gold honor cord, a medallion, or a stoll at graduation. The society's colors are blue and gold; royal blue and light gold are preferred.

The society's logo or keyconsists of a stacked banner with the Greek letters "ΦΑ" vertically in gold, on a blue background.

== Membership ==
Membership in Phi Alpha is by invitation to students who are enrolled in a college social work program as an undergraduate, graduate, or doctoral student. To be eligible for membership, students must rank in the top 35 percent of their class after having completed nine semester hours of social work courses or 35.5 percent of the credit hours required for their degree. After graduating, collegiate members became alumni members for life.

Phi Alpha also admits faculty, honorary, and professional members. Full-time faculty may apply for membership in Phi Alpha if they work at an institution with a chapter and have at least a master's degree in social work. Professional members are working in the field of social work and met the student criteria while in college, but either did not join or were at an institution that lacked a chapter. Honorary members are non-students who have made contributions to the field of social work. Honorary members are usually recognized by local chapters and do not have voting rights in the society.

== Activities ==
Phi Alpha's annual service project is Special Olympics. Phi Alpha presents several awards and scholarships annually, including the Advisor of the Year, the Chapter Service Award, the Patty Gibbs-Wahlberg Scholarship, the MSW Scholarship, and the Student Leadership Award.

== Chapters ==
The honor society has chartered more than 470 chapters. In 2024, it had 62 active chapters.

== See also ==
- Honor society
- Professional fraternities and sororities
