= List of Tau Kappa Alpha chapters =

Tau Kappa Alpha was a collegiate honor society devoted to the promotion of public speaking (forensics). Tau Kappa Alpha and Delta Sigma Rho merged to form Delta Sigma Rho-Tau Kappa Alpha on August 18, 1963. Following is a list of the chapters at the time of its merger with Delta Sigma Rho.

Charter date and range	Institution	Location	Status	Notes
1908 – August 18, 1963	Butler University	Indianapolis, Indiana	Merged	
1908–1920; 1956 – August 18, 1963	University of Notre Dame	Notre Dame, Indiana	Merged	
1908 – August 18, 1963	University of Cincinnati	Cincinnati, Ohio	Merged	
1908–1920	Harvard University	Cambridge, Massachusetts	Merged	
1908 – August 18, 1963	Miami University	Oxford, Ohio	Merged	
1909 – August 18, 1963	University of Denver	Denver, Colorado	Merged	
1909–1911	Colby College	Waterville, Maine	Inactive	
1909–1956	Vanderbilt University	Nashville, Tennessee	Inactive	
1909–1920	Columbia University	New York City, New York	Inactive	
1909–1956	University of North Carolina at Chapel Hill	Chapel Hill, North Carolina	Inactive	
1910 – August 18, 1963	University of Utah	Salt Lake City, Utah	Merged	
1910–1920; 1936 – August 18, 1963	Montana State University	Bozeman, Montana	Merged	
1910 – August 18, 1963	New York University-University Heights	The Bronx, New York City, New York	Merged	
1912 – August 18, 1963	Muskingum University	New Concord, Ohio	Merged	
1912 – August 18, 1963	University of Richmond	Richmond, Virginia	Merged	
1912 – August 18, 1963	Louisiana State University	Baton Rouge, Louisiana	Merged	
1912 – August 18, 1963	New York University Washington Square	Greenwich Village, New York City, New York	Merged	
1912–1950	Lawrence University	Appleton, Wisconsin	Inactive	
1912 – August 18, 1963	University of Vermont	Burlington, Vermont	Merged	
1913–1934; 1956 – August 18, 1963	University of Kentucky	Lexington, Kentucky	Merged	
1913 – August 18, 1963	Randolph–Macon College	Ashland, Virginia	Merged	
1913 – August 18, 1963	Wabash College	Crawfordsville, Indiana	Merged	
1914–1922; 1938 – August 18, 1963	University of Southern California	Los Angeles, California	Merged	
1914 – August 18, 1963	Duke University	Durham, North Carolina	Merged	
1914 – August 18, 1963	University of Arkansas	Fayetteville, Arkansas	Merged	
1914–1955	University of Washington	Seattle, Washington	Inactive	
1914–1916	DePauw University	Greencastle, Indiana	Inactive	
1915 – August 18, 1963	University of Alabama	Tuscaloosa, Alabama	Merged	
1915 – August 18, 1963	Dickinson College	Carlisle, Pennsylvania	Merged	
1915–1955	Indiana University Bloomington	Bloomington, Indiana	Inactive	
1916–1938; 1950 – August 18, 1963	Clark University	Worcester, Massachusetts	Merged	
1916 – August 18, 1963	Colorado College	Colorado Springs, Colorado	Merged	
1916 – August 18, 1963	Ohio University	Athens, Ohio	Merged	
1916 – August 18, 1963	Purdue University	West Lafayette, Indiana	Merged	
1916 – August 18, 1963	St. Lawrence University	Canton, New York	Merged	
1916 – August 18, 1963	University of Tennessee	Knoxville, Tennessee	Merged	
1916 – August 18, 1963	Westminster College	Fulton, Missouri	Merged	
1917 – August 18, 1963	Emory and Henry College	Emory, Virginia	Merged	
1917–1955	Bethany College	Bethany, West Virginia	Inactive	
1917–1950	Gettysburg College	Gettysburg, Pennsylvania	Inactive	
1917–1929	Monmouth University	West Long Branch, New Jersey	Inactive	
1917 – August 18, 1963	University of Mississippi	University, Mississippi	Merged	
1917 – August 18, 1963	Occidental College	Los Angeles, California	Merged	
1917 – August 18, 1963	Southern Methodist University	Dallas, Texas	Merged	
1918–before 1962	Lafayette College	Easton, Pennsylvania	Inactive	
1919 – August 18, 1963	University of Rhode Island	Kingston, Rhode Island	Merged	
1920–1936	Middlebury College	Middlebury, Vermont	Inactive	
1920–1936	Illinois College	Jacksonville, Illinois	Inactive	
1921–1932	Augustana University	Sioux Falls, South Dakota	Inactive	
1921–1934	Union College	Schenectady, New York	Inactive	
1921 – August 18, 1963	Bucknell University	Lewisburg, Pennsylvania	Merged	
1921–1928; 1950 – August 18, 1963	Utah State University	Logan, Utah	Merged	
1921–1935; 1956 – August 18, 1963	College of William & Mary	Williamsburg, Virginia	Merged	
1921 – August 18, 1963	Wittenberg University	Springfield, Ohio	Merged	
1922–1934; 1952 – August 18, 1963	Emory University	Atlanta, Georgia	Merged	
1922 – August 18, 1963	Roanoke College	Salem, Virginia	Merged	
1922 – August 18, 1963	Brigham Young University	Provo, Utah	Merged	
1923 – August 18, 1963	Hampden–Sydney College	Hampden Sydney, Virginia	Merged	
1923 – August 18, 1963	Lynchburg College	Lynchburg, Virginia	Merged	
1923–1953	Franklin & Marshall College	Lancaster, Pennsylvania	Inactive	
1924 – August 18, 1963	Berea College	Berea, Kentucky	Merged	
1924 – August 18, 1963	Denison University	Granville, Ohio	Merged	
1924–1952	University of Mount Union	Alliance, Ohio	Inactive	
1924–before 1962	Albright College	Reading, Pennsylvania	Inactive	
1925 – August 18, 1963	Cornell College	Mount Vernon, Iowa	Inactive	
1925–before 1962	Furman University	Greenville, South Carolina	Inactive	
1925 – August 18, 1963	Ursinus College	Collegeville, Pennsylvania	Merged	
1925 – August 18, 1963	Bridgewater College	Bridgewater, Virginia	Merged	
1926 – August 18, 1963	University of Florida	Gainesville, Florida	Merged	
1926 – August 18, 1963	Willamette University	Salem, Oregon	Merged	
1926 – August 18, 1963	University of New Hampshire	Durham, New Hampshire	Merged	
1926–1954	Hendrix College	Conway, Arkansas	Inactive	
1926–1953	Muhlenberg College	Allentown, Pennsylvania	Inactive	
1927–1955	Juniata College	Huntingdon, Pennsylvania	Inactive	
1927–1955	Randolph-Macon Women's College	Lynchburg, Virginia	Inactive	
1927–1955	Birmingham–Southern College	Birmingham, Alabama	Inactive	
1928 – August 18, 1963	Waynesburg University	Waynesburg, Pennsylvania	Merged	
1928 – August 18, 1963	University of Evansville	Evansville, Indiana	Merged	
1928–1935	McMurry University	Abilene, Texas	Inactive	
1928 – August 18, 1963	Western Michigan University	Kalamazoo, Michigan	Merged	
1929 – August 18, 1963	Rutgers University	New Brunswick, New Jersey	Merged	
1929 – August 18, 1963	Capital University	Bexley, Ohio	Merged	
1929–before 1962	Keuka College	Keuka Park, New York	Inactive	
1929 – August 18, 1963	Earlham College	Richmond, Indiana	Merged	
1930–1952	Susquehanna University	Selinsgrove, Pennsylvania	Inactive	
1930–1960	Upsala College	East Orange, New Jersey	Inactive	
1931–1952	Westhampton College	Richmond, Virginia	Inactive	
1932–1952	Radford University	Radford, Virginia	Inactive	
1934–1955	Brenau University	Gainesville, Georgia	Inactive	
1935–before 1962	Hobart College	Geneva, New York	Inactive	(Note: Chapter formed from Phi Beta Sigma.)
1935–before 1962	Arkansas State University	Jonesboro, Arkansas	Inactive	
1935 – August 18, 1963	Auburn University	Auburn, Alabama	Merged	(Note: Chapter acquired in a national merger with Alpha Phi Epsilon.)
1935–before 1962	Union University	Jackson, Tennessee	Inactive	
1935–before 1962	Western Maryland College	Westminster, Maryland	Inactive	
1935–before 1962	La Verne College	La Verne, California	Inactive	
1935–before 1962	Kenyon College	Gambier, Ohio	Inactive	
1935–before 1962	Southwestern Presbyterian University	Memphis, Tennessee	Inactive	
1936 – August 18, 1963	Lincoln Memorial University	Harrogate, Tennessee	Merged	
1936–before 1962	Drew University	Madison, New Jersey	Inactive	
1936 – August 18, 1963	Hanover College	Hanover, Indiana	Merged	
1936 – August 18, 1963	Manchester College	North Manchester, Indiana	Merged	
1937 – August 18, 1963	University of the Pacific	Stockton, California	Merged	
1937–before 1962	College of Charleston	Charleston, South Carolina	Inactive	
1938–before 1962	Georgian Court University	Lakewood Township, New Jersey	Inactive	
1938 – August 18, 1963	University of New Mexico	Albuquerque, New Mexico	Merged	
1938–before 1962	Moorhead State College	Moorhead, Minnesota	Inactive	
1939 – August 18, 1963	St. Cloud State University	St. Cloud, Minnesota	Inactive	
1939–1952	Florida Southern College	Lakeland, Florida	Inactive	
1940 – August 18, 1963	Mercer University	Macon, Georgia	Merged	
1941 – August 18, 1963	Alma College	Alma, Michigan	Merged	
1941 – August 18, 1963	Murray State University	Murray, Kentucky	Merged	
1941 – August 18, 1963	University of California, Santa Barbara	Santa Barbara, California	Merged	
1941 – August 18, 1963	Indiana State University	Terre Haute, Indiana	Merged	
1941 – August 18, 1963	Case Western Reserve University	Cleveland, Ohio	Merged	(Note: Chapter formed at Case Institute of Technology, which merged to create Case Western Reserve University in 1967.)
1942–before 1962	Saint Mary's College of California	Moraga, California	Inactive	
1948 – August 18, 1963	Loyola University Maryland	Baltimore, Maryland	Merged	
1950 – August 18, 1963	Virginia Tech	Blacksburg, Virginia	Merged	
1950 – August 18, 1963	Ball State University	Muncie, Indiana	Merged	
1951 – August 18, 1963	Florida State University	Tallahassee, Florida	Merged	
1951 – August 18, 1963	University at Albany, SUNY	Albany, New York	Merged	(Note: Chapter formed at the New York Teachers at Albany, now called University at Albany, SUNY.)
1953 – August 18, 1963	Davidson College	Davidson, North Carolina	Merged	
1953 – August 18, 1963	California State University, Long Beach	Long Beach, California	Merged	
1953 – August 18, 1963	Memphis State University	Memphis, Tennessee	Merged	
1955 – August 18, 1963	Minnesota State University, Mankato	Mankato, Minnesota	Merged	
1955 – August 18, 1963	Morgan State University	Baltimore, Maryland	Merged	
1955 – August 18, 1963	Tufts University	Medford, Massachusetts	Merged	
1956 – August 18, 1963	Massachusetts Institute of Technology	Cambridge, Massachusetts	Merged	
1956 – August 18, 1963	University of South Carolina	Columbia, South Carolina	Merged	
1956 – August 18, 1963	Xavier University	Cincinnati, Ohio	Merged	
1958 – August 18, 1963	Bellarmine University	Louisville, Kentucky	Merged	
1958 – August 18, 1963	Samford University	Homewood, Alabama	Merged	
1958 – August 18, 1963	University of Maryland, College Park	College Park, Maryland	Merged	
1958 – August 18, 1963	University of Miami	Coral Gables, Florida	Merged	
1959 – August 18, 1963	Howard University	Washington, D.C.	Merged	
1959 – August 18, 1963	Rochester Institute of Technology	Rochester, New York	Merged	
1960 – August 18, 1963	Saint Anselm College	Goffstown, New Hampshire	Merged	
1960 – August 18, 1963	Western Kentucky University	Bowling Green, Kentucky	Merged	
1960 – August 18, 1963	New Mexico Highlands University	Las Vegas, New Mexico	Merged	
1961 – August 18, 1963	Middlebury College	Middlebury, Vermont	Merged	
1961 – August 18, 1963	Missouri State University	Springfield, Missouri	Merged	(Note: Chapter formed at Southwest Missouri State, now called Missouri State University.)
1961 – August 18, 1963	Washington and Lee University	Lexington, Virginia	Merged	
