= List of Delta Sigma Rho chapters =

Delta Sigma Rho was a collegiate honor society devoted to the promotion of public speaking (forensics). It merged with Tau Kappa Alpha, a similar organization, to form Delta Sigma Rho-Tau Kappa Alpha in 1963. Following are its chapters at the time of its merger with Tau Kappa Alpha; inactive chapters and institutions are in italics.

Chapter name	Symbols	Charter date and range	Institution	Location	Status	Ref.
Chicago	CH	1906	University of Chicago	Chicago, Illinois	Merged	
Illinois	ILL	1906	University of Illinois Urbana-Champaign	Urbana, Illinois	Merged	
Iowa	IU	1906	University of Iowa	Iowa City, Iowa	Merged ?	
Michigan	M	1906	University of Michigan	Ann Arbor, Michigan	Merged	
Minnesota	MN	1906	University of Minnesota	Minneapolis, Minnesota	Merged	
Nebraska	N	1906	University of Nebraska–Lincoln	Lincoln, Nebraska	Merged	
Northwestern	NO	1906	Northwestern University	Evanston, Illinois	Merged	
Wisconsin	WIS	1906	University of Wisconsin–Madison	Madison, Wisconsin	Merged	
Ohio Wesleyan	OW	1907	Ohio Wesleyan University	Delaware, Ohio	Merged	
Georgie Washington	GW	1908	George Washington University	Washington, D.C.	Merged	
Indiana		1908–1922	Indiana University Bloomington	Bloomington, Indiana	Merged	
Virginia	VA	1908	University of Virginia	Charlottesville, Virginia	Merged	
Missouri	MO	1908	University of Missouri	Columbia, Missouri	Merged	
Beloit	BE	1909	Beloit College	Beloit, Wisconsin	Merged	
Brown	BR	1909	Brown University	Providence, Rhode Island	Merged	
Harvard	HR	1909	Harvard University	Cambridge, Massachusetts	Merged	
Iowa State	ISC	1909	Iowa State University	Ames, Iowa	Merged	
Missouri	MO	1909	University of Missouri	Columbia, Missouri	Merged ?	
Pennsylvania	P	1909	University of Pennsylvania	Philadelphia, Pennsylvania	Merged	
Texas	T	1909	University of Texas at Austin	Austin, Texas	Merged	
Yale	Y	1909	Yale University	New Haven, Connecticut	Merged	
Colgate	COL	1910	Colgate University	Hamilton, New York	Merged	
Colorado	CLR	1910	University of Colorado Boulder	Boulder, Colorado	Merged	
Columbia	CLB	1910–1947	Columbia University	New York City, New York	Inactive	
Dartmouth	D	1910–1943	Dartmouth College	Hanover, New Hampshire	Merged	
Kansas	K	1910	University of Kansas	Lawrence, Kansas	Merged	
Ohio State	O	1910	Ohio State University	Columbus, Ohio	Merged	
Syracuse	SY	1910	Syracuse University	Syracuse, New York	Merged	
Wesleyan	WES	1910	Wesleyan University	Middletown, Connecticut	Merged	
Williams	WM	1910	Williams College	Williamstown, Massachusetts	Merged	
Albion	A	1911	Albion College	Albion, Michigan	Merged	
Carleton	CA	1911	Carleton College	Northfield, Minnesota	Merged	
Cornell	COR	1911	Cornell University	Ithaca, New York	Merged	
Knox	KX	1911	Knox College	Galesburg, Illinois	Merged ?	
North Dakota	ND	1911	University of North Dakota	Grand Forks, North Dakota	Merged	
Princeton	PR	1911–1947	Princeton University	Princeton, New Jersey	Inactive	
Stanford	ST	1911	Stanford University	Stanford, California	Merged	
Swarthmore	SW	1911	Swarthmore College	Swarthmore, Pennsylvania	Inactive	
Western Reserve	WR	1911	Case Western Reserve University	Cleveland, Ohio	Merged	(Note: Chapter was established at Western Reserve University, which merged to form Case Western Reserve University in 1965.)
Allegheny	AL	1913	Allegheny College	Meadville, Pennsylvania	Merged	
Amherst	AM	1913	Amherst College	Amherst, Massachusetts	Merged	
Iowa State Teachers	IT	1913	University of Northern Iowa	Cedar Falls, Iowa	Merged	
Oklahoma	OK	1913	University of Oklahoma	Norman, Oklahoma	Merged	
Washington and Lee	WL	1913–1943	Washington and Lee University	Lexington, Virginia	Merged	
Bates	B	1915	Bates College	Lewiston, Maine	Merged	
DePauw	DP	1915	DePauw University	Greencastle, Indiana	Merged	
Southern California	SC	1915	University of Southern California	Los Angeles, California	Merged	
Vassar		1917–1931	Vassar College	Poughkeepsie, New York	Inactive	
Mount Holyoke	MH	1917	Mount Holyoke College	South Hadley, Massachusetts	Inactive	
Pennsylvania State	PS	1917	Pennsylvania State University	State College, Pennsylvania	Merged	
Washington State	WSC	1917–1946	Washington State University	Pullman, Washington	Merged	
Washington and Jefferson	WJ	1917	Washington & Jefferson College	Washington, Pennsylvania	Merged	
Wyoming	WYO	1917	University of Wyoming	Laramie, Wyoming	Merged	
Pittsburgh	PT	1920	University of Pittsburgh	Pittsburgh, Pennsylvania	Merged	
Whitman	WHIT	1920–1957	Whitman College	Walla Walla, Washington	Inactive	
Arizona	AR	1920–before 1963	University of Arizona	Tucson, Arizona	Inactive	
Washington Univ. (MO)	W	1922	Washington University in St. Louis	St. Louis, Missouri	Merged	
Oregon State	ORS	1922	Oregon State University	Corvallis, Oregon	Merged	(Note: With the national merger, this chapter merged with a chapter of Tau Kappa Alpha)
Wooster	WO	1922	College of Wooster	Wooster, Ohio	Merged	
Hamilton	H	1922	Hamilton College	Clinton, New York	Merged	
California	C	1922–1957	University of California, Berkeley	Berkeley, California	Inactive	
West Virginia	WVA	1923	West Virginia University	Morgantown, West Virginia	Merged	
Idaho	I	1926	University of Idaho	Moscow, Idaho	Merged ?	
Oregon	OR	1926	University of Oregon	Eugene, Oregon	Merged	
Pomona	PO	1928	Pomona College	Claremont, California	Merged	
Marquette	MQ	1930	Marquette University	Milwaukee, Wisconsin	Merged	
Elmira	EL	1931	Elmira College	Elmira, New York	Merged	
American	AMER	1932	American University	Washington, D.C.	Merged	
Rockford	R	1933	Rockford University	Rockford, Illinois	Merged	
Creighton	CR	1934	Creighton University	Omaha, Nebraska	Merged	
Boston	BU	1935	Boston College	Chestnut Hill, Massachusetts	Merged	
Oberlin	OB	1936	Oberlin College	Oberlin, Ohio	Merged	
Wayne State	WAY	1937	Wayne State University	Detroit, Michigan	Merged	
Brooklyn	BK	1940	Brooklyn College	New York City, New York	Merged	
Wells	WEL	1941–1957	Wells College	Aurora, New York	Inactive	
Wichita	WICH	1941	Wichita State University	Wichita, Kansas	Merged	
Hawaii	HW	1947	University of Hawaiʻi at Mānoa	Honolulu, Hawaii	Merged	
Nevada	NEV	1948	University of Nevada, Reno	Reno, Nevada	Merged	
Mundelein	MU	1949	Mundelein College	Chicago, Illinois	Merged	
Kansas State	KA	1951	Kansas State University	Manhattan, Kansas	Merged	
Grinnell	GR	1951	Grinnell College	Grinnell, Iowa	Merged	
Connecticut	CON	1952	University of Connecticut	Storrs, Connecticut	Merged	
Temple	TE	1950	Temple University	Philadelphia, Pennsylvania	Merged	
Indiana	IN	1951	Indiana University Bloomington	Bloomington, Indiana	Merged ?	
Texas Tech.	TT	1953	Texas Tech University	Lubbock, Texas	Merged	
Mount Mercy	MM	1954	Mount Mercy University	Cedar Rapids, Iowa	Merged	
University of Washington	WA	1954	University of Washington	Seattle, Washington	Merged ?	
Michigan State	MSU	1958	Michigan State University	East Lansing, Michigan	Merged	
John Carroll	JCU	1958	John Carroll University	University Heights, Ohio	Merged	
Morehouse	MR	1959	Morehouse College	Atlanta, Georgia	Merged	
Lehigh	LU	1960	Lehigh University	Bethlehem, Pennsylvania	Merged	
Loyola Chicago	L	1960	Loyola University Chicago	Chicago, Illinois	Merged	
Tulane	TU	1960	Tulane University	New Orleans, Louisiana	Merged	
University of N.Y. (Fredonia)	UNYF	1960	State University of New York at Fredonia	Fredonia, New York	Merged	
North Carolina	NC	1960	University of North Carolina at Chapel Hill	Chapel Hill, North Carolina	Merged	
Washington State	WSU	1960	Washington State University	Pullman, Washington	Merged	
San Francisco State	SF	1961	San Francisco State University	San Francisco, California	Merged	
Kings	KC	1961	King University	Bristol, Tennessee	Merged	
Wisconsin-Milwaukee	UWM	1962	University of Wisconsin–Milwaukee	Milwaukee, Wisconsin	Merged	
At Large	L					
