= List of Delta Sigma Rho-Tau Kappa Alpha chapters =

Delta Sigma Rho-Tau Kappa Alpha was a collegiate honor society devoted to the promotion of public speaking (forensics). It was formed in 1963 by the merger of two similar organizations, Delta Sigma Rho and Tau Kappa Alpha. Following are the Delta Sigma Rho-Tau Kappa Alpha chapters as of 1991. Charter dates from the predecessor organizations were used after the merger.

Charter date	Institution	Location	Status	Ref.
1906	University of Chicago	Chicago, Illinois	Inactive	
1906	University of Illinois Urbana-Champaign	Urbana, Illinois	Inactive	
1906	University of Michigan	Ann Arbor, Michigan	Inactive	
1906	University of Minnesota	Minneapolis, Minnesota	Inactive	
1906	University of Nebraska–Lincoln	Lincoln, Nebraska	Inactive	
1906	Northwestern University	Evanston, Illinois	Inactive	
1906	University of Wisconsin–Madison	Madison, Wisconsin	Inactive	
1907	Ohio Wesleyan University	Delaware, Ohio	Inactive	
1908	Butler University	Indianapolis, Indiana	Inactive	
1908	University of Cincinnati	Cincinnati, Ohio	Inactive	
1908	George Washington University	Washington, D.C.	Inactive	
1908	Indiana University Bloomington	Bloomington, Indiana	Inactive	
1908	Miami University	Oxford, Ohio	Inactive	
1908	University of Missouri	Columbia, Missouri	Inactive	
1908	University of Notre Dame	Notre Dame, Indiana	Inactive	
1908	University of Virginia	Charlottesville, Virginia	Inactive	
1909	Beloit College	Beloit, Wisconsin	Inactive	
1909	Brown University	Providence, Rhode Island	Inactive	
1909	University of Denver	Denver, Colorado	Inactive	
1909	Harvard University	Cambridge, Massachusetts	Inactive	
1909	Iowa State University	Ames, Iowa	Inactive	
1909	University of North Carolina at Chapel Hill	Chapel Hill, North Carolina	Inactive	
1909	University of Pennsylvania	Philadelphia, Pennsylvania	Inactive	
1909	University of Texas at Austin	Austin, Texas	Inactive	
1909	Vanderbilt University	Nashville, Tennessee	Inactive	
1909	Yale University	New Haven, Connecticut	Inactive	
1910	Colgate University	Hamilton, New York	Inactive	
1910	University of Colorado Boulder	Boulder, Colorado	Inactive	
1910	Dartmouth College	Hanover, New Hampshire	Inactive	
1910	University of Kansas	Lawrence, Kansas	Inactive	
1910	Montana State University	Bozeman, Montana	Inactive	
1910	New York University-University Heights	The Bronx, New York City, New York	Inactive	
1910	Ohio State University	Columbus, Ohio	Inactive	
1910	Syracuse University	Syracuse, New York	Inactive	
1910	University of Utah	Salt Lake City, Utah	Inactive	
1910	Wesleyan University	Middletown, Connecticut	Inactive	
1910	Williams College	Williamstown, Massachusetts	Inactive	
1911	Albion College	Albion, Michigan	Inactive	
1911	Carleton College	Northfield, Minnesota	Inactive	
1911	Cornell University	Ithaca, New York	Inactive	
1911	University of North Dakota	Grand Forks, North Dakota	Inactive	
1911	Stanford University	Stanford, California	Inactive	
1911	Case Western Reserve University	Cleveland, Ohio	Inactive	(Note: Chapter was established at Western Reserve University, which merged to form Case Western Reserve University in 1965.)
1912	Louisiana State University	Baton Rouge, Louisiana	Inactive	
1912	Muskingum University	New Concord, Ohio	Inactive	
1912	New York University Washington Square	Greenwich Village, New York City, New York	Inactive	
1912	University of Richmond	Richmond, Virginia	Inactive	
1912	University of Vermont	Burlington, Vermont	Inactive	
1913	Allegheny College	Meadville, Pennsylvania	Inactive	
1913	Amherst College	Amherst, Massachusetts	Inactive	
1913	University of Northern Iowa	Cedar Falls, Iowa	Inactive	
1913	University of Kentucky	Lexington, Kentucky	Inactive	
1913	University of Oklahoma	Norman, Oklahoma	Inactive	
1913	Randolph–Macon College	Ashland, Virginia	Inactive	
1913	Wabash College	Crawfordsville, Indiana	Inactive	
1913	Washington and Lee University	Lexington, Virginia	Inactive	
1914	University of Arkansas	Fayetteville, Arkansas	Inactive	
1914	DePauw University	Greencastle, Indiana	Inactive	
1914	Duke University	Durham, North Carolina	Inactive	
1914	University of Oregon	Eugene, Oregon	Inactive	
1914	University of Southern California	Los Angeles, California	Inactive	
1915	University of Alabama	Tuscaloosa, Alabama	Inactive	
1915	Bates College	Lewiston, Maine	Inactive	
1915	Dickinson College	Carlisle, Pennsylvania	Inactive	
1916	Clark University	Worcester, Massachusetts	Inactive	
1916	Colorado College	Colorado Springs, Colorado	Inactive	
1916	Ohio University	Athens, Ohio	Inactive	
1916	Purdue University	West Lafayette, Indiana	Inactive	
1916	University of South Dakota	Vermillion, South Dakota	Inactive	
1916	St. Lawrence University	Canton, New York	Inactive	
1916	University of Tennessee	Knoxville, Tennessee	Inactive	
1916	Westminster College	Fulton, Missouri	Inactive	
1917	Emory and Henry College	Emory, Virginia	Inactive	
1917	University of Mississippi	University, Mississippi	Inactive	
1917	Occidental College	Los Angeles, California	Inactive	
1917	Pennsylvania State University	State College, Pennsylvania	Inactive	
1917	Southern Methodist University	Dallas, Texas	Inactive	
1917	Washington State University	Pullman, Washington	Inactive	
1917	Washington & Jefferson College	Washington, Pennsylvania	Inactive	
1917	University of Wyoming	Laramie, Wyoming	Inactive	
1919	University of Rhode Island	Kingston, Rhode Island	Inactive	
1920	Middlebury College	Middlebury, Vermont	Inactive	
1920	University of Pittsburgh	Pittsburgh, Pennsylvania	Inactive	
1921	Bucknell University	Lewisburg, Pennsylvania	Inactive	
1921	Utah State University	Logan, Utah	Inactive	
1921	College of William & Mary	Williamsburg, Virginia	Inactive	
1921	Wittenberg University	Springfield, Ohio	Inactive	
1922	Brigham Young University	Provo, Utah	Inactive	
1922	Emory University	Atlanta, Georgia	Inactive	
1922	Hamilton College	Clinton, New York	Inactive	
1922	Oregon State University	Corvallis, Oregon	Inactive	
1922	Roanoke College	Salem, Virginia	Inactive	
1922	Washington University in St. Louis	St. Louis, Missouri	Inactive	
1922	College of Wooster	Wooster, Ohio	Inactive	
1923	Hampden–Sydney College	Hampden Sydney, Virginia	Inactive	
1924	Berea College	Berea, Kentucky	Inactive	
1924	Denison University	Granville, Ohio	Inactive	
1924	West Virginia University	Morgantown, West Virginia	Inactive	
1925	Bridgewater College	Bridgewater, Virginia	Inactive	
1925	Ursinus College	Collegeville, Pennsylvania	Inactive	
1926	University of Florida	Gainesville, Florida	Inactive	
1926	University of New Hampshire	Durham, New Hampshire	Inactive	
1926	Willamette University	Salem, Oregon	Inactive	
1927	Birmingham–Southern College	Birmingham, Alabama	Inactive	
1928	University of Evansville	Evansville, Indiana	Inactive	
1928	Pomona College	Claremont, California	Inactive	
1928	Waynesburg University	Waynesburg, Pennsylvania	Inactive	
1928	Western Michigan University	Kalamazoo, Michigan	Inactive	
1929	Capital University	Bexley, Ohio	Inactive	
1929	Earlham College	Richmond, Indiana	Inactive	
1929	Rutgers University	New Brunswick, New Jersey	Inactive	
1930	Marquette University	Milwaukee, Wisconsin	Inactive	
1931	Elmira College	Elmira, New York	Inactive	
1932	American University	Washington, D.C.	Inactive	
1933	Rockford University	Rockford, Illinois	Inactive	
1934	Creighton University	Omaha, Nebraska	Inactive	
1935	Auburn University	Auburn, Alabama	Inactive	
1935	Boston College	Chestnut Hill, Massachusetts	Inactive	
1936	Hanover College	Hanover, Indiana	Inactive	
1936	Lincoln Memorial University	Harrogate, Tennessee	Inactive	
1936	Manchester University	North Manchester, Indiana	Inactive	
1936	Oberlin College	Oberlin, Ohio	Inactive	
1937	University of the Pacific	Stockton, California	Inactive	
1937	Wayne State University	Detroit, Michigan	Inactive	
1938	University of New Mexico	Albuquerque, New Mexico	Inactive	
1940	Brooklyn College	New York City, New York	Inactive	
1940	Mercer University	Macon, Georgia	Inactive	
1941	Alma College	Alma, Michigan	Inactive	
1941	University of California, Santa Barbara	Santa Barbara, California	Inactive	
1941	Indiana State University	Terre Haute, Indiana	Inactive	
1941	Murray State University	Murray, Kentucky	Inactive	
1941	Wichita State University	Wichita, Kansas	Inactive	
1942	Case Western Reserve University	Cleveland, Ohio	Inactive	(Note: Chapter formed at Case Institute of Technology, which merged to create Case Western Reserve University in 1967.)
1947	University of Hawaiʻi at Mānoa	Honolulu, Hawaii	Inactive	
1948	Loyola University Maryland	Baltimore, Maryland	Inactive	
1948	University of Nevada, Reno	Reno, Nevada	Inactive	
1949	Mundelein College	Chicago, Illinois	Inactive	
1950	Ball State University	Muncie, Indiana	Inactive	
1950	Temple University	Philadelphia, Pennsylvania	Inactive	
1950	Virginia Tech	Blacksburg, Virginia	Inactive	
1951	Florida State University	Tallahassee, Florida	Inactive	
1951	Grinnell College	Grinnell, Iowa	Inactive	
1951	Kansas State University	Manhattan, Kansas	Inactive	
1951	University at Albany, SUNY	Albany, New York	Inactive	
1952	University of Connecticut	Storrs, Connecticut	Inactive	
1953	California State University, Long Beach	Long Beach, California	Inactive	
1953	Davidson College	Davidson, North Carolina	Inactive	
1953	Texas Tech University	Lubbock, Texas	Inactive	
1954	Mount Mercy University	Cedar Rapids, Iowa	Inactive	
1955	Minnesota State University, Mankato	Mankato, Minnesota	Inactive	
1955	Morgan State University	Baltimore, Maryland	Inactive	
1955	Tufts University	Medford, Massachusetts	Inactive	
1956	Massachusetts Institute of Technology	Cambridge, Massachusetts	Inactive	
1956	University of South Carolina	Columbia, South Carolina	Inactive	
1956	Xavier University	Cincinnati, Ohio	Inactive	
1958	Bellarmine University	Louisville, Kentucky	Inactive	
1958	Howard University	Washington, D.C.	Inactive	
1958	John Carroll University	University Heights, Ohio	Inactive	
1958	University of Maryland, College Park	College Park, Maryland	Inactive	
1958	University of Miami	Coral Gables, Florida	Inactive	
1958	Michigan State University	East Lansing, Michigan	Inactive	
1959	Morehouse College	Atlanta, Georgia	Inactive	
1959	Rochester Institute of Technology	Rochester, New York	Inactive	
1960	Lehigh University	Bethlehem, Pennsylvania	Inactive	
1960	Loyola University Chicago	Chicago, Illinois	Inactive	
1960	New Mexico Highlands University	Las Vegas, New Mexico	Inactive	
1960	State University of New York at Fredonia	Fredonia, New York	Inactive	
1960	Saint Anselm College	Goffstown, New Hampshire	Inactive	
1960	Tulane University	New Orleans, Louisiana	Inactive	
1960	Western Kentucky University	Bowling Green, Kentucky	Inactive	
1961	King University	Bristol, Tennessee	Inactive	
1961	San Francisco State University	San Francisco, California	Inactive	
1961	Missouri State University	Springfield, Missouri	Inactive	(Note: Chapter formed at Southwest Missouri State, now called Missouri State University.)
1961	Yeshiva University	New York City, New York	Inactive	
1962	Hiram College	Hiram, Ohio	Inactive	
1962	University of Wisconsin–Milwaukee	Milwaukee, Wisconsin	Inactive	
1963	Wake Forest University	Winston-Salem, North Carolina	Inactive	
1964	LIU Post	Brookville, New York	Inactive	
1964	Eastern Kentucky University	Richmond, Kentucky	Inactive	
1964	University of Georgia	Athens, Georgia	Inactive	
1964	University of Massachusetts Amherst	Amherst, Massachusetts	Inactive	
1964	Queens College, City University of New York	Queens, New York	Inactive	
1964	St. Mary's University, Texas	San Antonio, Texas	Inactive	
1965	Clemson University	Clemson, South Carolina	Inactive	
1965	Weber State University	Ogden, Utah	Inactive	
1965	Whittier College	Whittier, California	Inactive	
1966	Hampton University	Hampton, Virginia	Inactive	
1966	Binghamton University	Binghamton, New York	Inactive	(Note: Chapter was established at Harpur College, which became the State University of New York at Binghamton in 1966.)
1966	University of Hartford	West Hartford, Connecticut	Inactive	
1966	Samford University	Homewood, Alabama	Inactive	
1966	Spring Hill College	Mobile, Alabama	Inactive	
1967	Emerson College	Boston, Massachusetts	Inactive	
