= List of University of Richmond fraternities and sororities =

At the University of Richmond, there are many fraternities and sororities of varying social, academic, honor, and service natures. Currently, there are eight recognized social fraternities and eight social sororities, along with a number of non-social fraternities and sororities. The fraternity system began in 1870 when Kappa Alpha was organized at Richmond College and has continued to the present day. Sororities at the University of Richmond arrived in 1987. Sigma Phi Epsilon started at Richmond College in 1901 and grew to become a North American fraternity.

Following is a list of University of Richmond fraternities and sororities.

== Academic, honor, and service fraternities and sororities ==
Organization	Chapter name	Charter date and range	Type	Status	Ref.
Alpha Kappa Psi	Delta Zeta	May 19, 1955 – 2002; 2010 – April 3, 2010	Business	Active	
Alpha Sigma Kappa	Mu	April 14, 2018	Women in technical studies	Active	
Alpha Phi Omega	Omicron Phi	May 21, 1965	Service.	Active	
Alpha Phi Epsilon		1922	National Literary Society with which Mu Sigma Rho affiliated	Inactive	
Alpha Chi Sigma	Delta Kappa		Chemistry	Active	
Alpha Psi Omega	Eta	May 21, 1928	Theater	Active	
Beta Beta Beta	Beta Theta	May 19, 1939	Biology Honor Society	Active	(Note: Formed from the Phoenix Society)
Beta Gamma Sigma	Gamma	1965	Business Honor Society	Active	
Delta Epsilon Chi		xxxx – 2011	Business	Inactive	(Note: Suspended fall 2011, which led to the establishment of Delta Sigma Pi.)
Delta Sigma Pi	Rho Omega	2013	Business	Active	
Delta Sigma Rho-Tau Kappa Alpha		August 18, 1963	Speech	Active	(Note: Formed from Tau Kappa Alpha national fraternity merging with Delta Sigma Rho.)
Delta Theta Phi	Jefferson	September 26, 1913 – 1941; 1946	Law	Active	(Note: Formed from a chapter of Theta Lambda Phi national fraternity. Closed during World War II.)
Eta Sigma Phi	Beta Gamma	May 17, 1940	Classics	Active	(Note: Formed from the Pegasus Club, established in 1938.)
Gamma Theta Upsilon	Mu Delta	November 17, 2010	Geography Honor Society	Active	
Gamma Sigma Epsilon	Epsilon Beta	May 29, 1948 – 2010	Chemistry Honor Society	Inactive	
Kappa Delta Pi	Theta Theta	1955	Education	Active	
Lambda Pi Eta	Iota Theta		Rhetoric / Communications	Active	
Mu Sigma Rho (local)		1846	Literary	Active	(Note: Mu Sigma Rho was the publisher, along with the Philologian Club, of Monthly Musings, which later transformed into The Messenger, Richmond College's literary magazine and newspaper before The Collegian was established in 1914. Last mention in The Collegian was in 1953.)
Omicron Delta Epsilon	Lambda		Economics	Active	
Omicron Delta Kappa	Epsilon	March 12, 1921	Leadership	Active	
Phi Alpha Delta	Coke/Patrick Henry	October 29, 1948	Law / Pre-Law	Active	
Phi Alpha Theta		November 1940	History	Active	(Note: Formed from Rho Eta Sigma)
Phi Beta Delta	Gamma Iota	1995	International Scholars	Active	
Phi Beta Kappa		April 12, 1929	Honor.	Active	
Phi Delta Phi	James Madison Inn	1962	Law	Active	
Phi Eta Sigma		November 19, 1975	Freshman Honor Society	Active	
Phi Kappa Mu (local)			Music Honor Society	Active	
Phi Sigma Iota	Iota Epsilon	1975	Foreign Languages Honor Society	Active	
Phi Sigma Tau	Virginia Delta		Philosophy	Active	
Pi Alpha (local)		1921 – October 25, 1930	Honor society	Inactive	(Note: Established for Westhampton College Seniors. Merged into the Mortar Board)
Pi Delta Epsilon		November 26, 1926 – 1981	Journalism	Inactive	(Note: Formed from the Collegian Press Club)
Pi Mu Epsilon	Virginia Alpha	November 5, 1948	Mathematics.	Active	
Pi Sigma Alpha	Beta Xi	1953	Political / Social Sciences Honor Society	Active	
Psi Chi		1950	Psychology	Active	(Note: Formed from Psychology Club, established in 1938.)
Rho Eta Sigma (local)		1938–1940	History		(Note: Merged into Phi Alpha Theta.)
Sigma Delta Pi	Sigma Gamma		Spanish	Inactive	
Sigma Xi		March 6, 1970	Engineering	Active	
Sigma Pi Beta (local)		1974–1988	Business society for women	Inactive	
Sigma Pi Sigma		1932	Physics	Active	
Sigma Tau Delta		March 8, 1966	English	Active	
Sigma Upsilon		April 25, 1922	Literary	Active	(Note: Formed from the Writer's Club.)
Tau Kappa Alpha		1912–1963	Debate	Inactive	(Note: Merged into Delta Sigma Rho–Tau Kappa Alpha.)
Theta Alpha Kappa		1986–xxxx ?	Religious studies and theology	Inactive	
Theta Lambda Phi	Jefferson	1911–1913	Law	Inactive	(Note: Merged into Delta Theta Phi.)

== Social fraternities ==
Following are the social fraternities that have formed at the University of Richmond. Active organizations are indicated in bold; inactive sororities are in italics.

Organization	Chapter name	Charter date and range	Status	Ref.
**Alpha Delta** **(local)**		1928	Active	(Note: Alpha Delta organized as a social and ministerial club in April 1923 and became a fraternity in spring 1928. It olonized as a chapter of Alpha Kappa Lambda in fall 1960 but was never chartered. It continues to function as a local ministeria and social organization)
Alpha Epsilon Pi	Upsilon Rho	May 15, 1954 – 1965; 1966–c. 1969	Inactive	(Note: Chapter formed from the Upsilon Rho local fraternity.)
**Alpha Phi Alpha**	Upsilon Gamma	2009	Active	
Alpha Tau Omega	Alpha Alpha	September 15, 1878 – c. 1883	Inactive	
Beta Theta Pi	Alpha Kappa	December 1871 – c. 1895	Inactive	
Chi Sigma (local)		November 1955 – April 13, 1958	Merged	(Note: Merged into Sigma Chi on April 13, 1958.)
Delta Kappa Epsilon	Rho Beta	2002–2010s	Inactive	
**Kappa Alpha Order**	Eta	March 18, 1870	Active	
**Kappa Sigma**	Beta Beta	March 5, 1898 – December 3, 2012; 2017	Active	(Note: The chapter's charter was revoked in 2012 because of multiple violations.)
Kappa Sigma Kappa		c. 1875–1884 – 1890	Inactive	(Note: When the chapter closed in 1890, most of its members transferred to Phi Delta Theta.)
**Lambda Chi Alpha**	Alpha Chi	May 10, 1918 – January 1999; January 31, 2010	Active	(Note: Chapter formed from Sigma Delta Chi, a local fraternity organized in 1916. Its charter was suspended in 1999 for violations.)
Phi Alpha	Rho	February 6, 1925 – April 19, 1959	Merged	(Note: Merged into Phi Sigma Delta in 1959.)
Phi Alpha Chi		1883–1895	Inactive	
Phi Beta Sigma		1980–xxxx ?	Inactive	
Phi Delta Theta	Virginia Delta	September 30, 1875 – 1895; February 17, 1939 – March 13, 2006	Inactive	(Note: Chapter was rechartered in 1939 from Phi Delta Omega, a local fraternity. It closed in 2006 due to low membership.)
Phi Delta Omega (local)		1915–1939	Merged	(Note: Merged into Phi Delta Theta in 1939.)
**Phi Gamma Delta**	Rho Chi	January 27, 1890 – January 27, 2012; January 2016	Active	
Phi Kappa Sigma	Phi	January 15, 1873 – 1875; 1884–April 1996	Inactive	(Note: Closed 1875, with most of its brothers moving to Beta Theta Pi. Rechartered 1884 and closed in April 1996 due to low membership.)
Phi Phi Phi (local)		February 1917–September 1925	Merged	(Note: Closed in September 1925 but later merged into Phi Delta Omega and subsequently Phi Delta Theta in 1939.)
Phi Sigma Delta	Phi Rho	April 19, 1959 – 1970	Merged	(Note: Chapter formed from Phi Alpha. It merged into Zeta Beta Tau in 1970.)
Phi Theta Psi		c. 1875–1884 – c. 1892	Inactive	
Pi Delta Sigma (local)		December 4, 1930 – February 4, 1938	Merged	(Note: ormed from P.I.N.E.S. Club, organized in May 1926. Merged into Sigma Alpha Epsilon in 1938.)
Pi Kappa Alpha	Omicron	1891–1893; 1901–August 2006; 2023	Active	(Note: Charter revoked August 2006 due to violations.)
Sigma Alpha Epsilon	Virginia Tau	October 15, 1884 – 1887; February 4, 1938 – 1991;1995-July 24, 2015	Inactive	(Note: Rechartered in 1938 from Pi Delta Sigma local fraternity. It was suspended indefinitely in 2015 due to risk management violations.)
Sigma Delta Chi (local)		1916–1918	Merged	(Note: Merged into Lambda Chi Alpha in 1918.)
Sigma Chi	Alpha Beta	1880–1880	Inactive	(Note: Chapter's charter was revoked within a few weeks. The fraternity was reestablished at Richmond in 1958 as the Epsilon Rho chapter.)
Sigma Chi	Epsilon Rho	April 13, 1958 – March 8, 2019	Inactive	(Note: Formed from Chi Sigma local fraternity. Chapter was suspended in 2019, due to hazing and is eligible to receive recognition again beginning in 2024.)
**Sigma Phi Epsilon**	Virginia Alpha	November 1, 1901	Active	(Note: This was the founding chapter of the fraternity.)
Theta Chi	Omicron	May 29, 1915 – November 1996; 2013–2020	Inactive	. (Note: Chapter formed from the local group, Zeta Xi, established in 1908. Its charter was revoked in 1996 due to low membership and chapter debt. After being rechartered in 2013, it was suspended by the university in 2020 and is eligible to receive recognition again beginning in 2024.)
Upsilon Rho (local)		1952–1954	Merged	(Note: Merged into Alpha Epsilon Pi in 1954.)
Zeta Beta Tau	Phi Rho	1970 – September 19, 1972	Inactive	(Note: Formed when Phi Sigma Delta national fraternity merged into Zeta Beta Tau.)
Zeta Xi (local)		1909 – May 29, 1915	Merged	(Note: Merged into Theta Chi in 1915)
**Alpha Psi Lambda**	University of Richmond Affiliate	2024	Active	(Note: Co-Ed Fraternity and the first Greek lettered organization on campus to fall within the Multicultural Greek Council umbrella.)

== Social sororities ==
Following are the social sororities that have formed at the University of Richmond. Active organizations are indicated in bold; inactive sororities are in italics.

Organization	Chapter name	Charter date and range	Status	Ref.
Alpha Chi Omega	Iota Mu	1991 – November 17, 2010	Inactive	(Note: Closed due to risk management violations.)
**Alpha Kappa Alpha**	Rho Mu	September 10, 1995	Active	
Alpha Phi	Eta Pi	January 1989 – October 26, 1997	Inactive	(Note: Closed due to low membership and financial issues)
Chi Omega	Tau Lambda	1987–Spring 1988	Inactive	(Note: Closed due to low membership)
**Delta Delta Delta**	Gamma Eta	1987	Active	
**Delta Gamma**	Zeta Gamma	1987	Active	
**Delta Sigma Theta**	Rho Rho	April 26, 1992	Active	
**Kappa Alpha Theta**	Epsilon Psi	1987	Active	
**Kappa Delta**	Theta Mu	2015	Active	
**Kappa Kappa Gamma**	Zeta Omicron	1987	Active	
Pi Beta Phi	Virginia Eta	1987 - Spring 2025	Inactive	(Note: Closed due to low membership)
Zeta Tau Alpha	Iota	1905–1908	Inactive	

== Fraternity lodges ==
The first fraternity houses at the University of Richmond were Phi Kappa Sigma and Kappa Sigma, which were built in 1928 and 1930, respectively. The other fraternities met in various rooms across the campus until the university began building lodges, starting in 1953 and ending in 1959. Phi Kappa Sigma and Kappa Sigma moved out of their old houses in 1959 to occupy their new lodges (9 and 10 on the map). Their old houses were converted into student dormitories and renamed Pacific House and Atlantic House. At UR, there are two "rows" of fraternity lodges: Old Fraternity Row (1–7 and 12–14 on the map) and New Fraternity Row (8–11 on the map). In 1996, the old Pi Kappa Alpha, Sigma Chi, and Lambda Chi Alpha lodges (12–14) were demolished to make room for a new parking lot for the Robins Center.

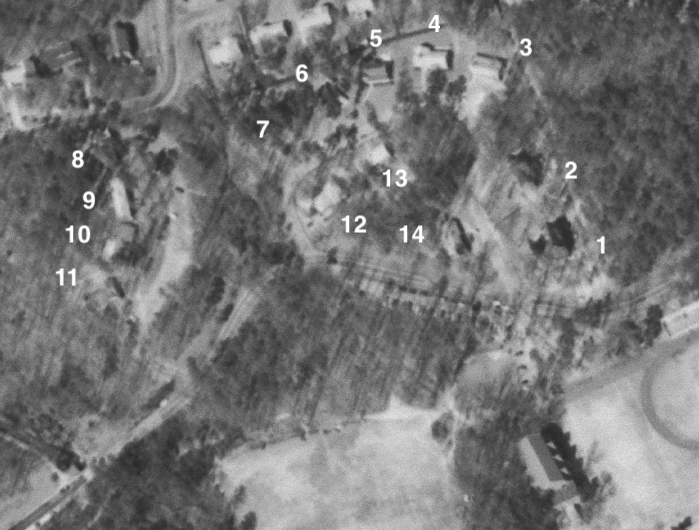
Map of UR Fraternity Lodges in 1968: 1=Pacific House, 2=Atlantic House, 3=Phi Sigma Delta, 4=Sigma Alpha Epsilon, 5=Phi Delta Theta, 6=Sigma Phi Epsilon, 7=Phi Gamma Delta, 8=Theta Chi, 9=Phi Kappa Sigma, 10=Kappa Sigma, 11=Kappa Alpha, 12=Pi Kappa Alpha, 13=Sigma Chi, 14=Lambda Chi Alpha. The future site of the Robins Center, Millhiser Gymnasium, and the future site of Robins Stadium can be seen at the bottom.

=== List of lodges ===
Fraternities at the University of Richmond do not have residential houses, but do have university-owned lodges for gatherings.

Number on map	Name	Photo	Year built	Notes
1	Pacific House		1928	Phi Kappa Sigma, 1928–September 1959. Currently student housing. Original address: 1 Fraternity Row
2	Atlantic House		1930	Kappa Sigma, 1930–September 1959. Currently student housing. Original address: 2 Fraternity Row
3	Law School Dormitory		1957	Phi Alpha (1957–1959), Phi Sigma Delta (1959–1970), Zeta Beta Tau (1970–1972). Currently a residence for undergraduates and law students. Address: 22D Old Fraternity Row
4	Student Organization Lodge		1954	Sigma Alpha Epsilon (1954–2015). Original address: 4 Fraternity Row
5	Pi Kappa Alpha		1953	Phi Delta Theta (1953–2006), Theta Chi (2013–2020), Pi Kappa Alpha (2024–to date). Address: 22F Old Fraternity Row
6	Sigma Phi Epsilon		1953	Address: 22H Old Fraternity Row
7	Phi Gamma Delta		1953	
8	Rethink Waste		1959	Theta Chi (1959–1996) and Sigma Chi (1999–2019). Address: 24D New Fraternity Row
9	Lambda Chi Alpha		1959	Phi Kappa Sigma (1959–1996), Pi Kappa Alpha (1996–2006), Lambda Chi Alpha (2010–to date). Address: 24C New Fraternity Row
10	Kappa Sigma		1959	Address: 24B New Fraternity Row
11	Kappa Alpha		1959	Address: 24A New Fraternity Row
12	Pi Kappa Alpha		1956	This lodge was demolished. Address: 5 Fraternity Row
13	Old Sigma Chi			Alpha Epsilon Pi (1950s–1965) and Sigma Chi (1965–1996) This lodge was demolished.
14	Old Lambda Chi Alpha		1959	This lodge was demolished.

=== Gallery of fraternity lodges ===
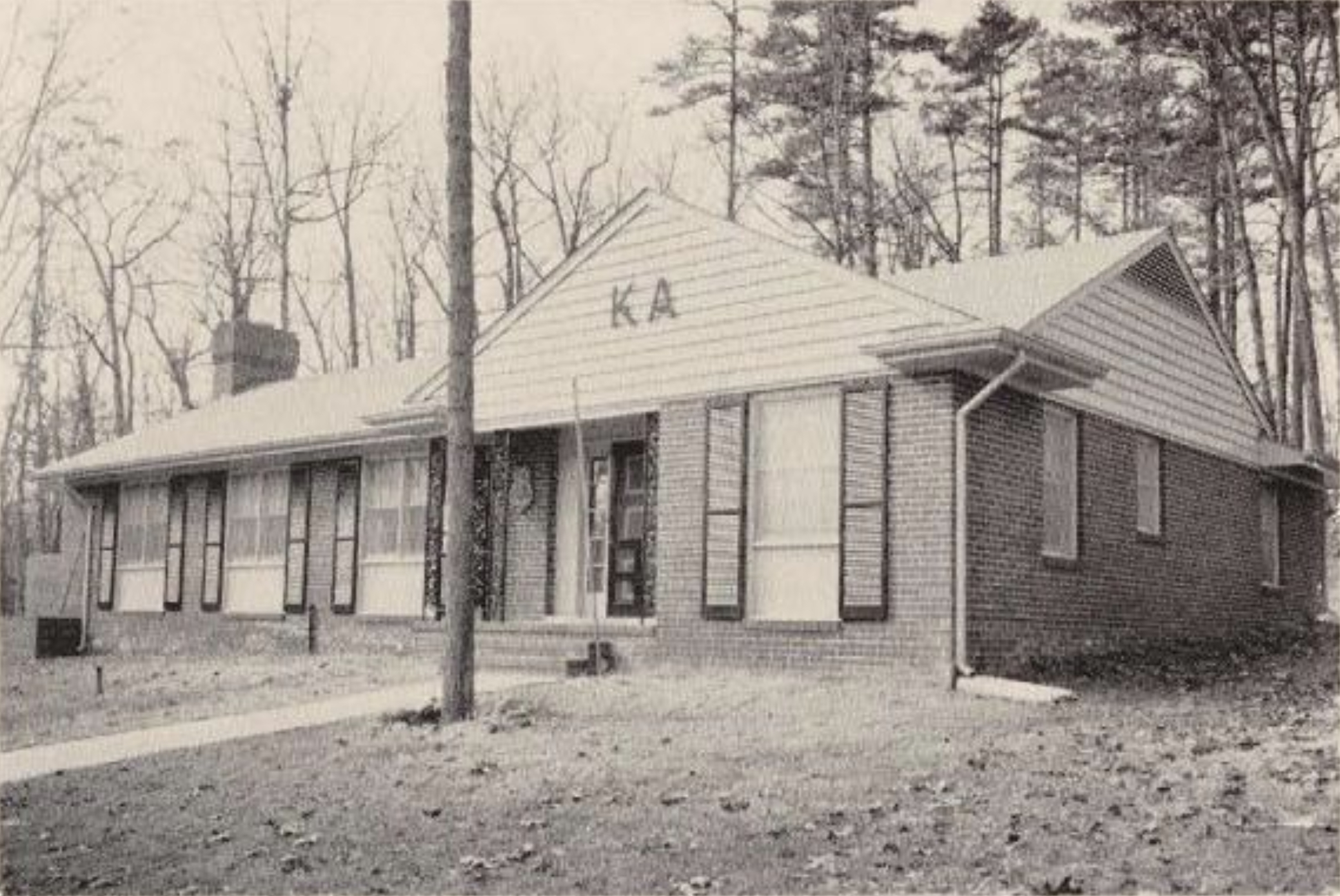
Kappa Alpha (1961)

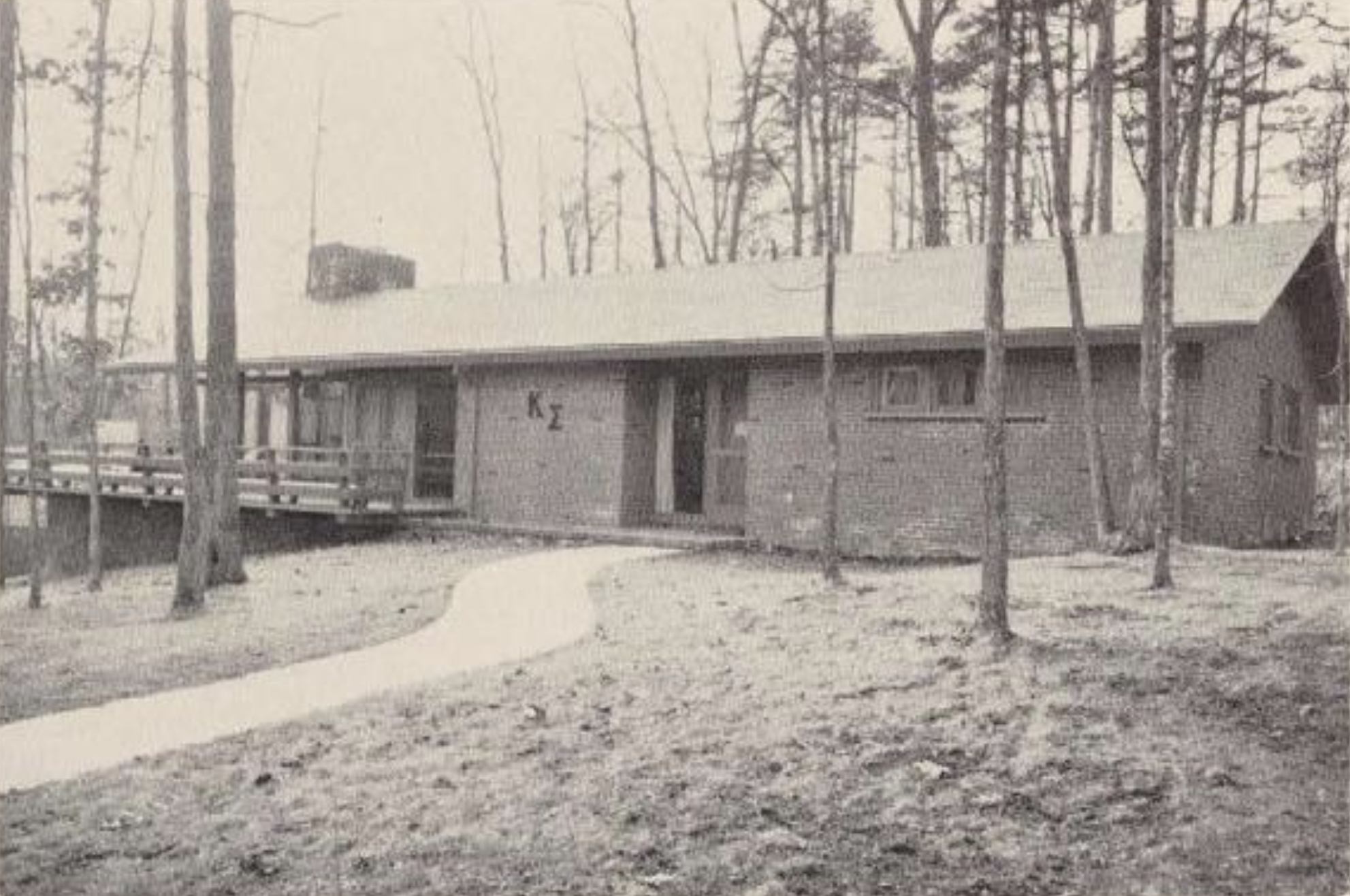
Kappa Sigma (1961)

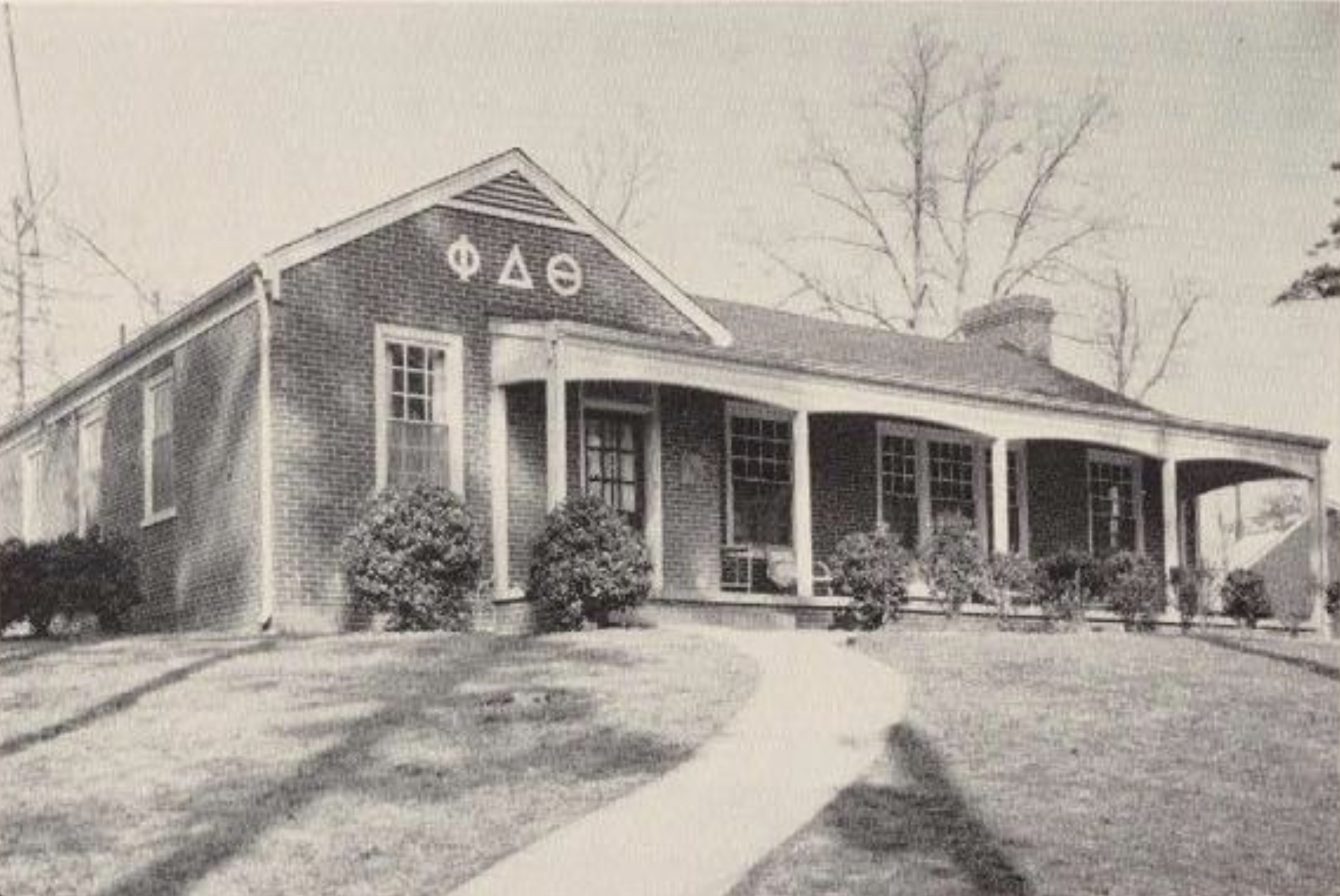
Phi Delta Theta (1961), later Theta Chi. Now Pi Kappa Alpha

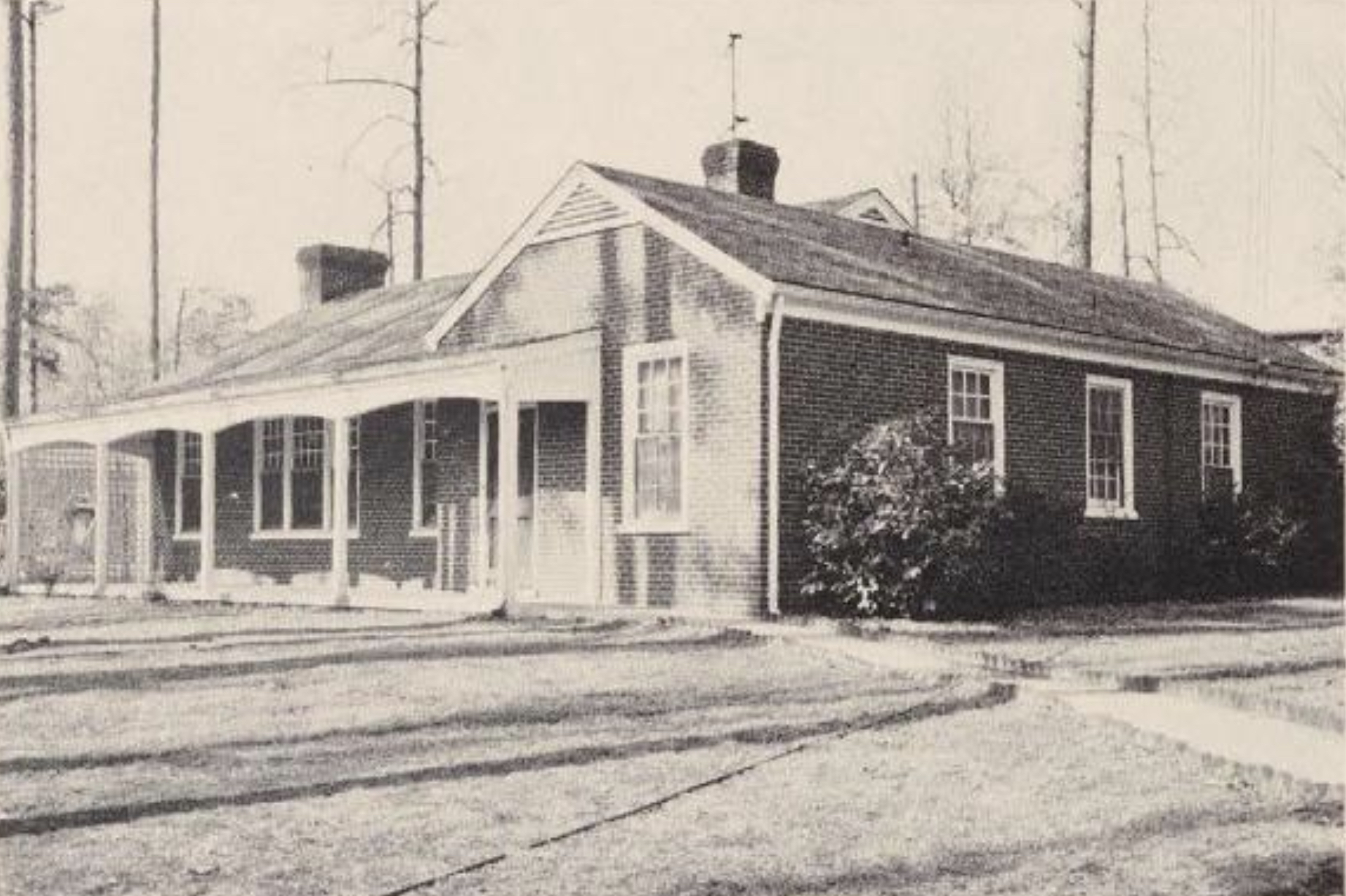
Phi Gamma Delta (1961)

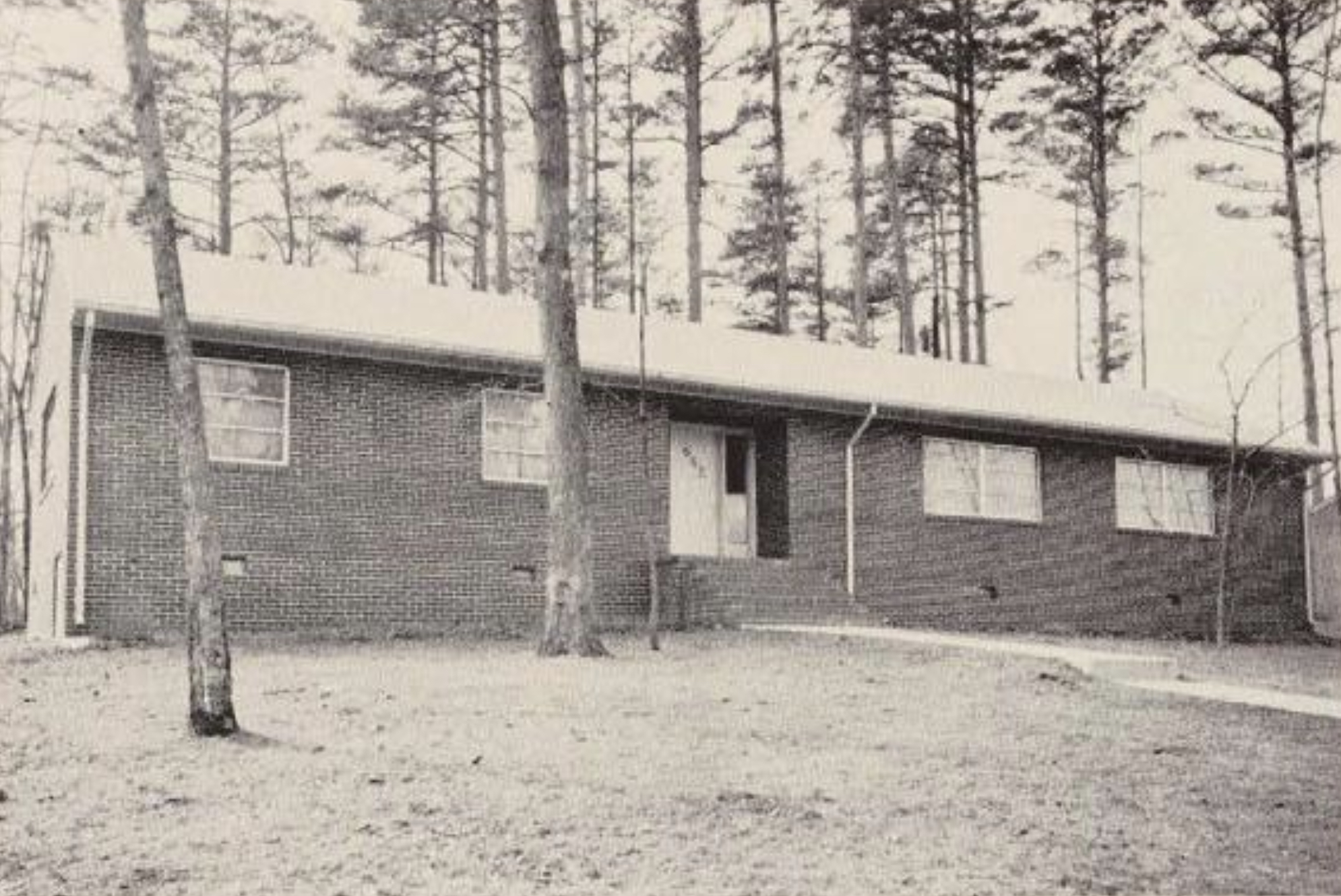
Phi Kappa Sigma (1961), later Pi Kappa Alpha. Now Lambda Chi Alpha

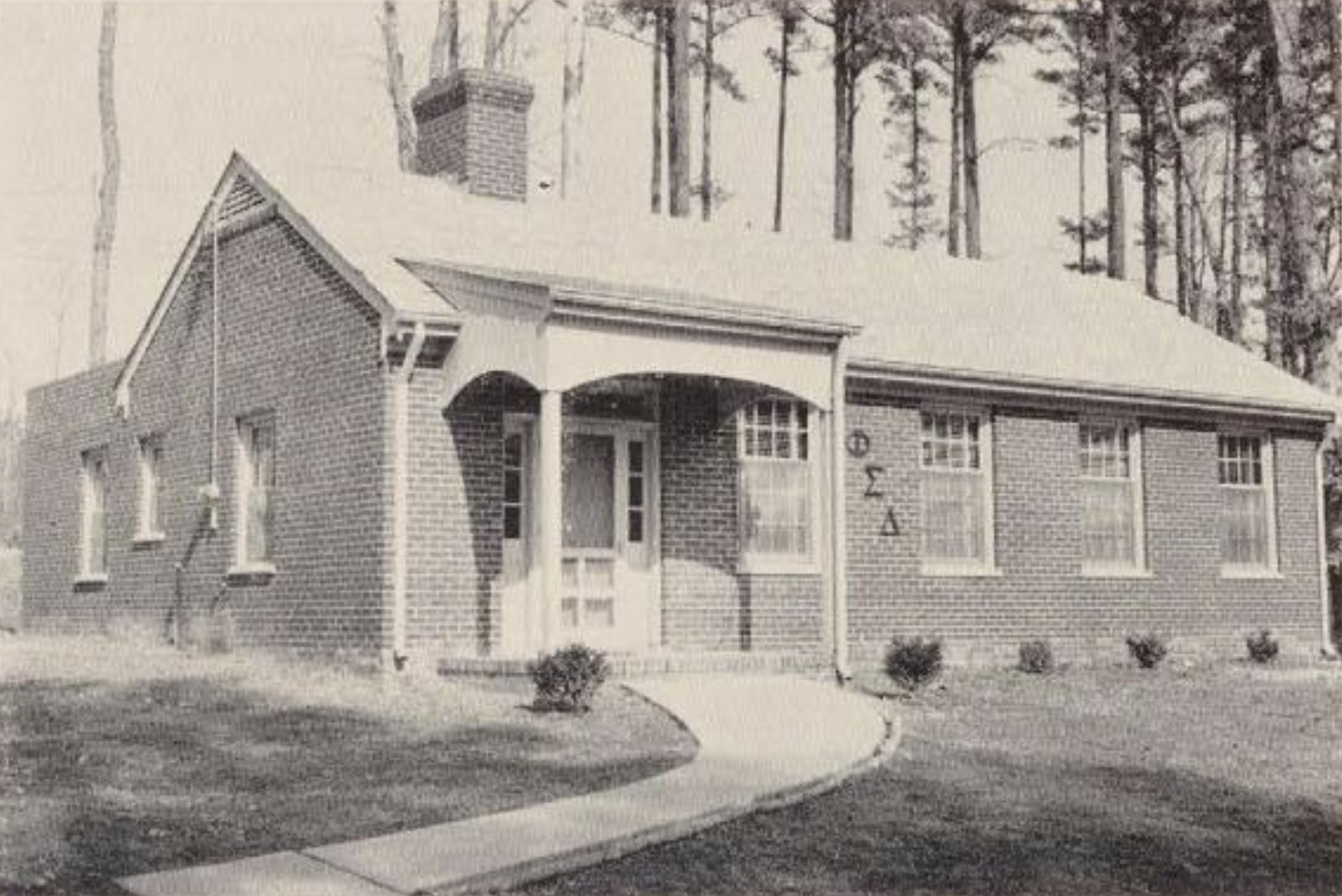
Phi Sigma Delta (1961), later Zeta Beta Tau. Now law student housing

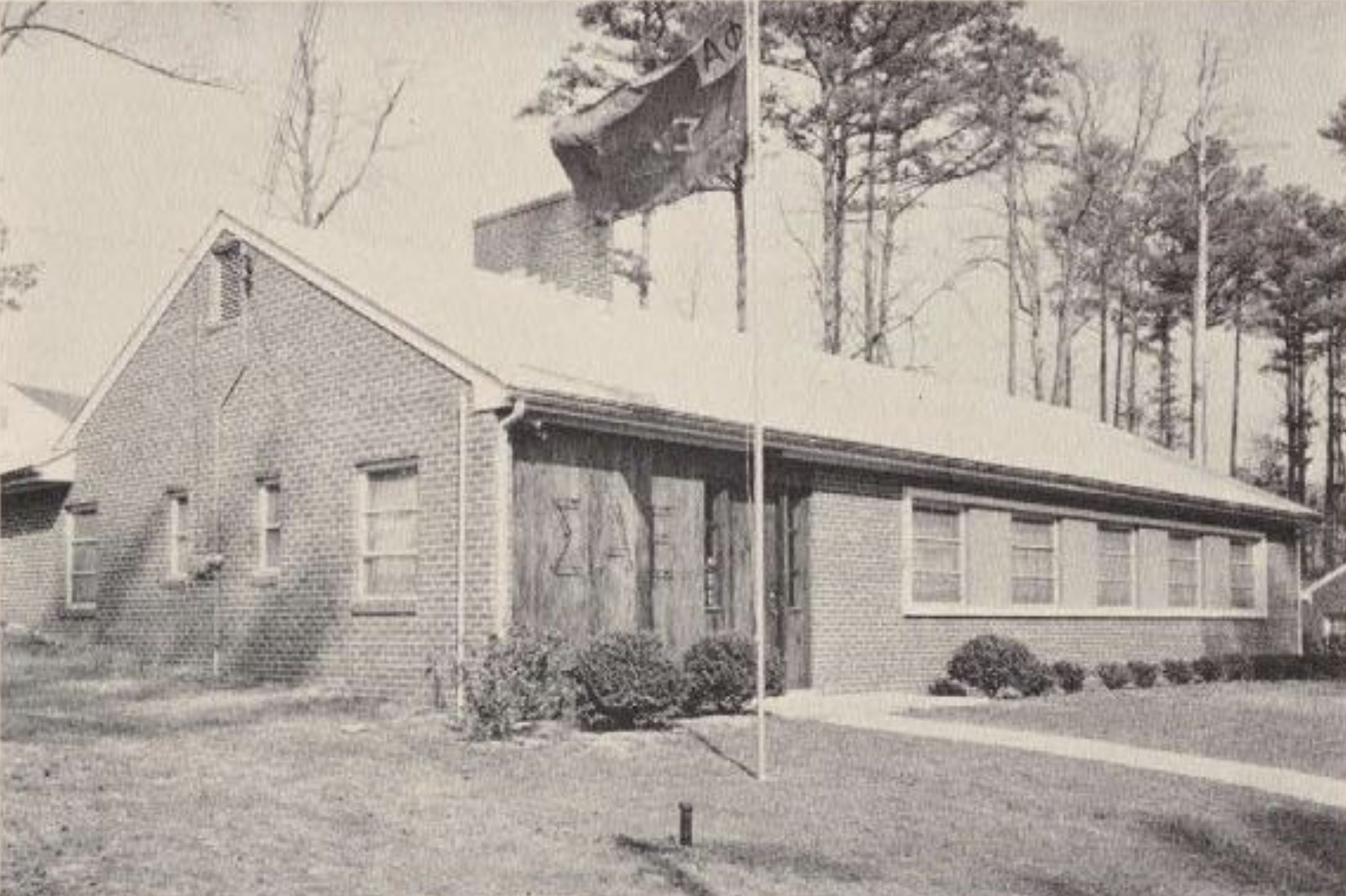
Sigma Alpha Epsilon (1961), now the student organization lodge

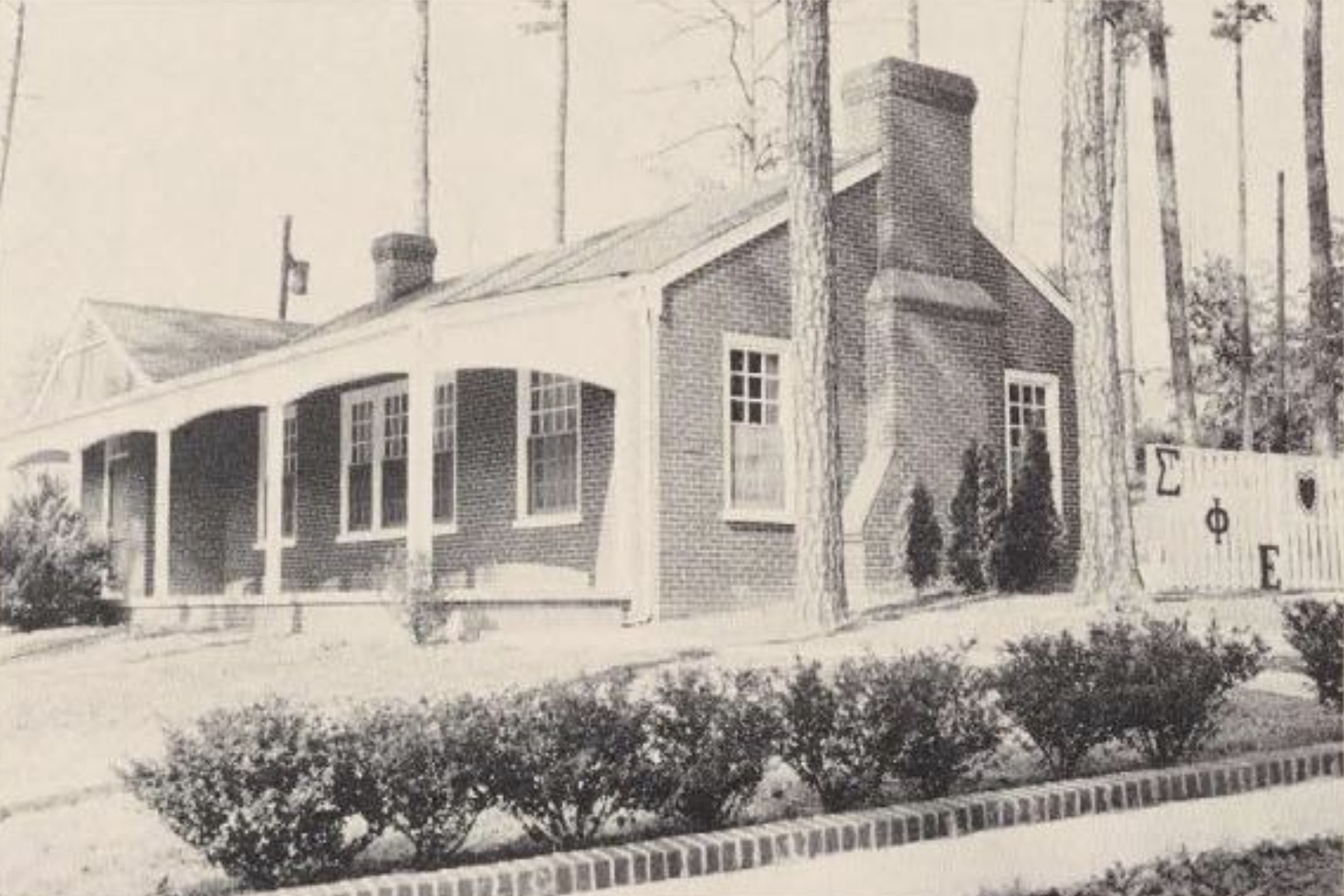
Sigma Phi Epsilon (1961)

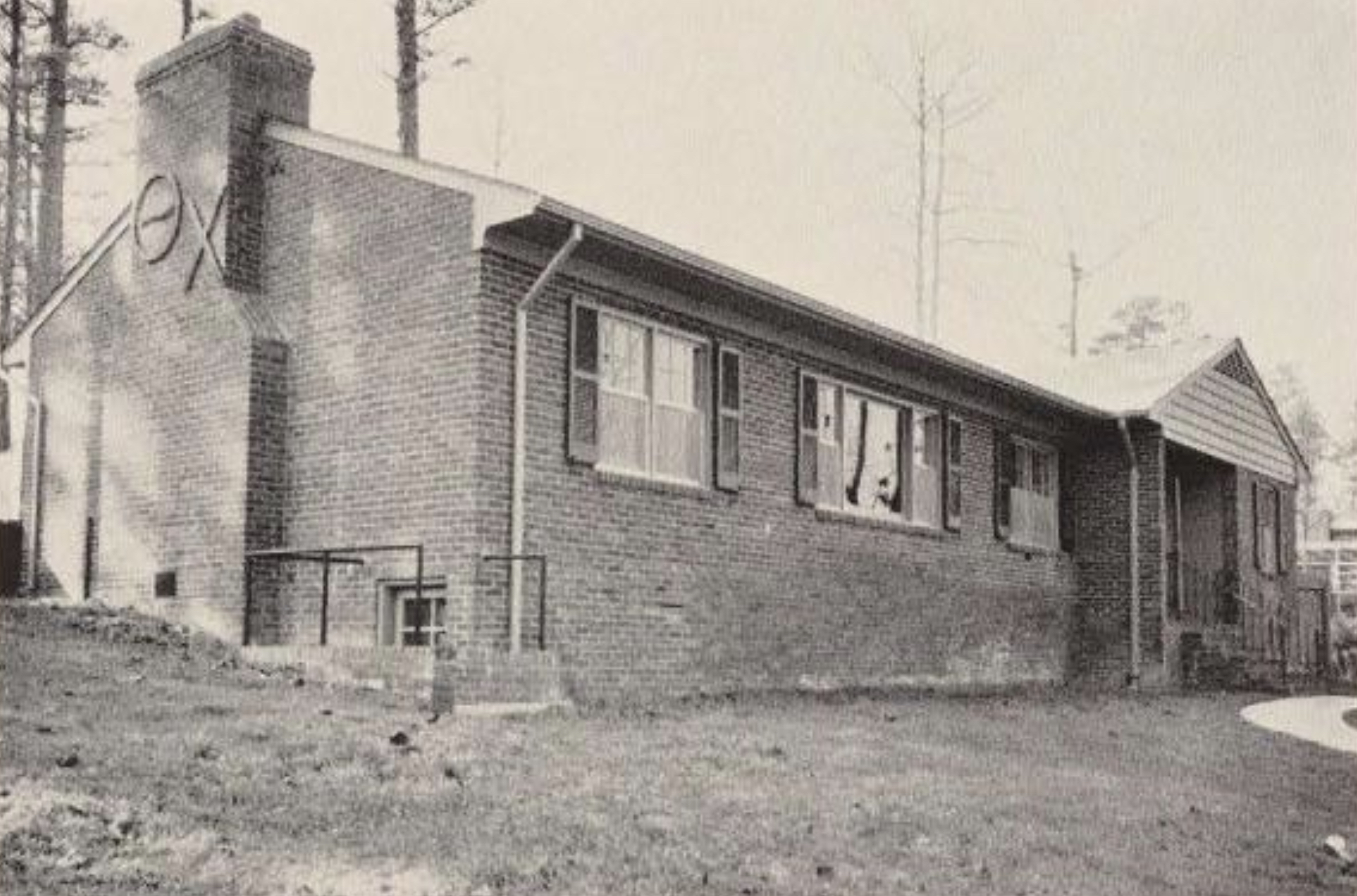
Theta Chi (1961), later Sigma Chi. Now the Rethink Waste lodge

== Sorority cottages ==
When sororities first arrived at the University of Richmond in 1987, they initially met in various rooms across campus. However, in 2012, a complex was built which features eight conjoined "cottages" and a larger event space known as "The Web." Sororities at the University of Richmond do not have residential houses, but do have university-owned cottages for gatherings.

Name	Photo	Year built	Notes
Pi Beta Phi		2012	
Kappa Kappa Gamma		2012	
Kappa Alpha Theta		2012	
Delta Sigma Theta		2012	
Delta Gamma		2012	
Delta Delta Delta		2012	
Alpha Kappa Alpha		2012	
Kappa Delta		2012	
