= Marshall Russell Reed =

American bishop

Marshall Russell Reed (15 September 1891 – March 1973) was an American bishop of The Methodist Church and the United Methodist Church, elected in 1948.

== Birth and family ==
Reed was born in Onsted, Michigan, the son of Fred Pitts Reed and Elsie Adelphia (Russell) Reed. He married Mary Esther Kirkendall 14 May 1917. They had the following children: (Mrs.) Elizabeth Jane (Gray), (Mrs.) Elsie Mae (Ferentz) and (Mrs.) Mary Louise (Ives).

== Education ==
Reed earned an A.B. degree in 1914 from Albion College. He attended Drew Theological Seminary, then earned the B.D. degree from Garrett Biblical Institute in 1916. He also earned an M.A. from Northwestern University in 1917.

He was a member of the Delta Tau Delta fraternity. He was also inducted into the Delta Sigma Rho and Phi Beta Kappa honorary fraternities.

Reed was honored with the D.D. degree by Albion College in 1931 and by Garrett Biblical Institute in 1940.

== Ordained ministry ==
Rev. Reed served the following appointments as pastor of Methodist Episcopal and Methodist Churches in the State of Michigan: Gaines, Onaway, Redford, the Jefferson Avenue Methodist Church in Detroit, Ypsilanti, and the Nardin Park Church in Detroit.

Rev. Reed was also elected as a delegate to the General Conferences of the Methodist Episcopal and Methodist Churches in 1932-48, including the Uniting Conference of 1939, and to Jurisdictional Conferences, 1940-48.

He served the Detroit Annual Conference as a member of the Board of Ministerial Training. He was a member of the Children's Home Society and of the Board of the Chelsea Home for the Aged.

Rev. Reed was a Mason and a member of Kiwanis. His hobbies included gardening, and he enjoyed football and baseball.

== Episcopal ministry ==
Rev. Reed was elected to the episcopacy by the 1948 North Central Jurisdictional Conference of The Methodist Church. He was assigned to the Detroit Episcopal Area (the Detroit and Michigan Annual Conferences). He retired in 1964.

Reed died in March 1973 in Chelsea, Michigan.

== See also ==
- List of bishops of the United Methodist Church
