= Herman T. Briscoe =

American chemist (1893–1960)

- Born: November 6, 1893; Shoals, Indiana, US
- Died: 8 October 1960 (aged 66); Indianapolis, Indiana, US
- Education: Indiana University
- Scientific career
- Fields: analytical chemistry; inorganic chemistry
- Thesis: The Properties of Dolomitic Limes as Related to the Properties of the Stones, the Conditions of Burning, and Subsequent Treatments (1924)
- Doctoral advisor: Frank C. Mathers

Herman Thompson Briscoe (November 6, 1893 – October 8, 1960) was an American chemist and professor of chemistry. The Herman T. Briscoe Professorship in Chemistry at Indiana University was established in 1961, and the Herman T. Briscoe Quadrangle Dormitory was dedicated in 1966.

== Early life and education ==
Herman T. Briscoe was born on November 6, 1893, in Shoals, Indiana. Briscoe received his teaching certificate in 1912 from Indiana University in Bloomington, Indiana and began teaching at his home high school in Shoals for three academic years before becoming principal of Shoals high school and later superintendent of Shoals school district. He returned to Indiana University, earning his A.B. degree in chemistry with high distinction in 1917. Briscoe would then enlist in the U.S. army as a private in May 1918, transferring to the Hercules Powder Company as a research chemist until his discharge in 1919. Between 1919 and 1922, Briscoe held successful teaching positions at Stark's Military Academy, as an Austin Teaching Fellow at Harvard University, and at Colby College. Returning to Indiana University for a third time, Herman T. Briscoe received his A.M. and Ph.D. degrees in chemistry in 1924 under the guidance of Professor Frank C. Mathers.

Briscoe married Orah Elberta Briscoe (née Cole) in 1928. Orah, born in Liberty Center, IN in 1907, received her B.A. in Latin in 1929 and her M.A. in English in 1934. In 1929, their first child Catherine was born. They would have a total of 4 children.

== Career ==
After receiving his Ph.D., Herman T. Briscoe was appointed assistant professor of chemistry at Indiana University, working his way to professor of chemistry in 1928. Throughout his career, Briscoe authored or coauthored 23 publications on conductivity, physical properties, and the reactions of organic and inorganic molecules, supervised the graduate studies of 25 students, and published several general chemistry textbooks.

In 1938, President of Indiana University Herman B. Wells appointed Briscoe as the secretary of the newly established self-survey committee, which sought the feedback of faculty and proposed administrative changes accordingly. In the same year, Briscoe was appointed Chairman of the Department of Chemistry of Indiana University following the recommendation of retiring Chairman Robert E. Lyons. Herman Briscoe would continue on to become Indiana University's first Dean of Faculties in 1939 and Vice President of Indiana University in 1940. Briscoe gave up his appointment as Chairman of the Department of Chemistry in order to focus on his administrative roles as Vice President and Dean of Faculties, in which he served until his retirement in 1959.

== Organizational involvement ==
- Fellow of the American Association for the Advancement of Science (1934)
- Fellow of the Indiana Academy of Science (1935)
- American Chemical Society
- Phi Beta Kappa
- Sigma Xi
- Tau Kappa Alpha
- Phi Lambda Upsilon
- Alpha Chi Sigma
- Lambda Chi Alpha

== Books ==
- Qualitative Chemical Analysis: Principles and methods, 1931
- General Chemistry for Colleges, 1935
- The Structure and properties of Matter, 1935
- An Introduction to College Chemistry, 1937
