= Archie Palmer =

American university president (1896–1985)

Archie MacInnes Palmer
- Born: May 9, 1896; Hoboken, New Jersey
- Died: March 1985 (aged 88)
- Education: Cornell University(A.B.); Columbia University(M.A.); The University of the South(D.C.L.)
- Known for: 8th President of the University of Tennessee at Chattanooga (1938-1942)

Archie MacInnes Palmer (1896-1985) was an American educator and academic administrator who served as 8th president of the University of Tennessee at Chattanooga from 1938 to 1942.

== Biography ==
Palmer was born May 9, 1896, in Hoboken, New Jersey, to Robert K. and Sarah G.(MacInnes) Palmer. Although he was a member of Cornell class of 1918, his college work was interrupted by the war from 1917 to 1920. He served as 1st Lieut. of infantry in the regular army in the United States, France and Germany. He received his A.B. in 1920 from Cornell, an M.A. in 1927 from Columbia University, and a D.C.L. from the University of the South in 1941.

He began his career as the Secretary of the Liberal Arts College at Cornell and then as Acting Dean for three years. He worked in sales and personnel research and Procter & Gamble Company from 1923 to 1925. He had been Alumni Secretary at Columbia University and for a period served as Associate Secretary of the Association of American Colleges. At the time of his election as President of the University of Tennessee at Chattanooga (UTC), he was Executive Secretary of the Cornellian Council of Cornell University. After he left the UTC presidency, her served as Director of Patent Policy Survey, National Research Council from 1946.

He was elected to honorary societies of Phi Beta Kappa, Phi Delta Kappa, Delta Sigma Rho, and Pi Gamma Mu. He was a member of the American Historical Association, the American Committee of International Student Service, and the Executive Committee of the American Hungarian Foundation.

== Works ==
- The Liberal Arts College Movement (1930)
- Architectural Planning of the American College (1933)
- College Instruction in Art (1934)
- University Patent Policies (1934)
- "Patents and University Research", Law and Contemporary Problems, Vol.12, No.4, (Autumn 1947), pp. 680–694.
- Administration of medical and pharmaceutical patents (Washington, National Academy of Sciences-National Research Council, 1955)
- Nonprofit research and patent management organization (1955)
- University research and patent policies, practices, and procedures (1962)

He published various other works on university administration and was a contributor to scientific and professional periodicals.
