= Russell L. Caldwell =

American historian (1904–1979)

- Born: Russell Leon Caldwell; August 13, 1904; Farrell, Pennsylvania, U.S.
- Died: May 23, 1979 (aged 74); Inglewood, California, U.S.
- Education: Hiram College (BA); University of Southern California (MA, PhD)
- Occupations: Historian; educator; community activist
- Spouse: Ruth (m. 1934)
- Children: 2

Russell Leon Caldwell (August 13, 1904 – May 23, 1979) was an American historian, educator, and community activist. He was born August 13, 1904, in Farrell, Pennsylvania, and died May 23, 1979, at Daniel Freeman Memorial Hospital in Inglewood, California, due to cardiovascular disease at the age of 74.

Caldwell and his wife, Ruth, were married September 2, 1934, in Toledo, Ohio, in a ceremony performed by Ruth's father, the Reverend B. T. Burnworth. Their son, Stanley Russell Caldwell, was born in Wooster, Ohio, where Caldwell was teaching in the high school before the family moved to southern California. Their daughter, Ruth, taught for many years at Luther College (Decorah, Iowa).

== Education ==
Caldwell received a Bachelor of Arts degree from Hiram College (OH) in 1927. While at Hiram, he was involved in the Delphic Literary Society, Pi Kappa Delta Debate Society, and the Men's Self-Government Society. He taught at Wooster (OH) High School from 1930 to 1944. Caldwell received his Master of Arts and Ph.D. degrees in history from the University of Southern California (USC) in 1933 and 1948, respectively. His master's thesis was titled An Historical Study of Saint Bernard of Clairvaux as Persecutor of Abelard; his doctoral dissertation was on The Influence of the Federal Bar Upon the Interpretation of the Constitution Under John Marshall.

== Academic career ==
Caldwell joined the USC faculty in 1945 as a member of the Department of History specializing in Early American History, American Intellectual-Cultural History, and European-American Relations. In 1946, he also became Chair of the Department of General Studies in American Civilization and Institutions.

His honorary and professional organization memberships included: The American Historical Society; the Mississippi Valley Historical Association; Phi Kappa Phi (all-university national scholarship society); Phi Alpha Theta (national history honor society); Pi Kappa Delta (national speech and debate honor society); Tau Kappa Alpha (national honor society in journalism and mass communications); and the American Association of University Professors (AAUP).

While on the USC faculty, Caldwell served as secretary and later president of the local chapter of the AAUP; president of what was renamed the Faculty Center after he successfully pressed for the merger of the Men's Faculty Club and the Women's Faculty Club; member of the University Faculty Senate; member of the University Committee on Directed Teaching; and faculty sponsor for numerous student organizations. He also served as president of the USC Retired Faculty Association in 1978–1979. He initiated and taught history classes in Europe during summer sessions. These courses combined travel with the study of European history and included interviews with leading European personalities involved in national and international affairs. (SOURCE: USC News Bureau, n.d.; from the USC University Archives). After formally retiring from USC, he was invited to create an institute for the study of U.S. presidential history at the University of California, Santa Barbara, but he declined and taught courses part-time on journalism, law, and government at USC until his death. Among numerous students that he mentored, one, Carole Shammas, now holds a chair in the Department of History at USC. His students also included football star Frank Gifford, who recalled his girlfriend urging him to take Caldwell's course "Man and Civilization."

== Political activism ==
During the 1950s, Caldwell was an outspoken critic of the U.S. House of Representatives Un-American Activities Committee (HUAC) and of Senator Joseph McCarthy and his pursuit of alleged Communists through the Senate Permanent Subcommittee on Investigations. He was shunned by many of his USC colleagues as well as by many USC alumni, publicly rebuked by USC President Fred D. Fagg, Jr., and had his classes infiltrated by California un-American activities committee investigators (Eisley, Cindy. 1974. "Russell Caldwell: Up Against the World," Campus [U.C. Santa Barbara] (October 23): 1–3). He also was able to force the University of California, Los Angeles (UCLA) to rehire several of its faculty who had been terminated for their supposed political beliefs. He was publicly labelled a Communist on television in a broadcast of the Freedom Forum.

In 1955, Caldwell organized a petition drive, signed by 135 of his USC faculty colleagues as well as ministers who were members of the Southern California Baptist Ministers Union, protesting the selection of Texas Governor Robert Allan Shivers (1949–1957) as USC Commencement speaker at the graduation ceremonies. In 1954, Shivers had been an outspoken critic of the Brown v. Board of Education of Topeka (KS) U.S. Supreme Court decision (347 U.S. 483). The petition to cancel the appearance of Gov. Shivers was rejected by USC President Fagg. There was speculation that these faculty protestors would stage an organized demonstration at the commencement ceremonies, but this did not take place.

== Community involvement ==
Caldwell and his family lived in the neighborhood just north of the USC University Park Campus at 825 West 32nd Street. The location is at the current intersection of University Avenue and West 32nd Street on land now occupied by Troy (Residence) Hall and across the street from the 32nd Street USC Magnet School.

Caldwell wrote and narrated 65 radio programs on American history for the Storer Broadcasting Co. of Miami and KGBS Los Angeles.

In 1959, Caldwell became active in the Hoover Urban Renewal Project. He was appointed by the Mayor of Los Angeles as secretary of the Hoover Urban Renewal Advisory Committee (HURAC). Later he was named to the Mayor's Committee of Consultants on Urban Renewal.

Caldwell also organized unsuccessful neighborhood efforts to block construction of the Harbor Freeway (US 110) just east of the University Park Campus. Freeway construction required demolition of much low-income housing throughout South Los Angeles.

In June 1971, Caldwell received a commendatory resolution from the Los Angeles City Council. The commendation was presented by Councilmember Pat Russell, herself a long-time advocate on behalf of residents threatened with displacement by urban renewal.

Caldwell served as president of the Board of Trustees of the West Adams Presbyterian Church, located just a few blocks north of the University Park Campus, which he and his family attended.

== Awards ==
Caldwell and his high school debate team received the Lowell Thomas Award for Outstanding Achievement in Oratory in 1940. In that same year, Caldwell received the Bruno E. Jacob Commendation for his Wooster High School accomplishments in National Forensic League competitions.

A Russell L. Caldwell Memorial Research Award was established at Hiram College in 1983. Funded by gifts from Caldwell's former speech students at Wooster High School, it is awarded in alternating years to students in the Departments of History and of Speech Communications to enhance their creativity and independent research during their final year in college. The fundraising campaign was spearheaded by 1942 Wooster High School graduate Dr. William R. Miner (B.A., Hiram College, 1945; M.S.W., University of Michigan, 1950; Ph.D., Brandeis University, 1976; LL.D., honoris causa, The College of Wooster, 1969).

Caldwell was inducted into the Debate Coaches Hall of Fame at Wooster High School where he developed the debate team while teaching history and speech from 1931 to 1946. (USC Retiree Community Newsletter, May 2013, p. 4).

== The Watts Riot and the origin of the Russell L. Caldwell Neighborhood Scholarship Program ==
The Watts riot (also known as the Watts rebellion) of August 11–17, 1965, began with the arrest of a young African-American man in this predominantly segregated area of South Central Los Angeles, south of the USC University Park Campus. Residents of the low-income area held deep-seated resentment for what was perceived as longstanding brutality by law enforcement agencies, including the Los Angeles Police Department. The weeklong rioting resulted in 34 deaths, 1,032 injuries, and 3,438 arrests.

Russell Caldwell, as an educator and resident of South Central Los Angeles, perceived one small step that could be taken to address the area's long-term problems. He and three of his colleagues launched what he called the USC Neighborhood Scholarship in December 1965, four months after the rioting. In a letter to USC faculty and staff, Caldwell invited his colleagues ". . . to join in this positive kind of demonstration . . ." (alluding to the street demonstrations of the Watts riot) by authorizing a $5.00 per month tax-deductible contribution to what he termed the "Faculty-Staff Scholarship for worthy students in the University's neighborhood who would not otherwise hope to attend USC" by filling in the payroll-deduction form at the bottom of the letter. He hoped to raise $2,000 annually for this scholarship.

The first USC Neighborhood Scholarship was awarded to Preston Mike, Jr., a mid-year graduate of Manual Arts High School (located between USC's University Park Campus and the Watts area of South Los Angeles) who enrolled at USC in the Spring Semester 1968. He was awarded an initial grant of $549 to help pay for books and tuition and was granted additional awards until his graduation in 1972. Since the program was founded, more than 400 USC undergraduates from the 10 designated high schools adjacent to the USC campuses have received Caldwell Scholarships totaling more than $1 million while working toward their degrees. https://ignite.usc.edu/project/15572 Like Caldwell himself, the vast majority have been the first in their families to receive a college degree.

After Caldwell's death, a special USC memorial service was held at the Faculty Center (of which Caldwell had served as president) on June 8, 1979. His family requested that, in lieu of flowers, contributions be made to the USC Neighborhood Scholarship Fund. Also, per his wishes, the USC Retired Faculty Association (RFA) became the sponsor of the scholarship and changed its name to the Russell L. Caldwell Neighborhood Scholarship Program in his honor. The program continues to provide support to qualifying undergraduates.

== Publications and professional papers ==
- "Building a Program of Extracurricular Speech in High School." Quarterly Journal of Speech 22:3 (1936): 397–400.
- A Testing Manual for Courses in American Civilization and Institutions. Dubuque, Iowa: W. C. Brown Co., 1950. (With Ernest W. Thacker)
- Panelist, "New Weapons for a New Diplomacy: United States Foreign Policy and Its Implementation." Riverside, California: Institute of World Affairs, November 14–17, 1952.
- American and California Government: National, State, Local—Political Parties and Administration. Columbia, Missouri: Lucas Brothers Publishers, University of Missouri, 1953. (With Ernest W. Thacker)
- "Is There an American Indian Policy?" Ethnology 2:2 (Spring, 1956): 97–10
- "Indian Reorganization and the Triumph of the Policy of Extinction." Columbus, Ohio: American Ethnohistoric Conference, Ohio Historical Society/The Ohio State University, November 2, 1956.
- American Freedom: A History. Revised Edition. Columbia, Missouri: Lucas Brothers Publishers, University of Missouri, 1967.

== Citations (selected) ==
- Daly, Heather Marie. 2013. American Indian Freedom Controversy: Political and Social Activism by Southern California Mission Indians, 1934–1958. Doctoral dissertation, Department of History, University of California, Los Angeles, p. 287.
- Munro, Doug. 2009. The Ivory Tower and Beyond: Participant Historians of the Pacific. Cambridge, UK: Cambridge Scholars Publishing, pp. 142–144.
