= Loren Reid =

American writer and professor

Loren D. Reid (August 26, 1905 – December 25, 2014) was a communication professor and a writer. In addition to shorter terms of service with other universities, he had a 31-year career at the University of Missouri, including two terms as chair of the Department of Communication. He served in a number of professional organizations related to speech and communicating, including standing as the 43rd president of the National Communication Association. He lived to 109 years of age, making him a centenarian.

== Personal life and education ==
Born in 1905 in Gilman City, Missouri, Loren Reid was the son of Gilman City Guide editor Dudley Reid and his wife Josephine. As a youth, Reid worked at his father's paper, both operating the linotype machine and writing up his interviews with travelers. After his parents took over the Osceola, Iowa paper Tribune in 1921, they relocated. Reid graduated from Osceola High School in 1922 and entered Grinell College, receiving degrees in history and English in 1927. While there, he met Augusta "Gus" Towner who would later become his wife and herself a professor, of English. Towne and Reid wed in 1930, during their studies at the University of Iowa. In 1932, Reid graduated from UoI with one of the first doctoral degrees awarded in the field of speech in the United States.

Augusta "Gus" Reid (June 23, 1907 – August 1, 2009), was herself a centenarian at 102 years old. Reid died at age 109 on Christmas Day, 2014. The couple were survived by their four children, 15 grandchildren, 25 great-grandchildren and 3 great-great-grandchildren.

== Teaching career ==
Reid began teaching English after receiving his undergraduate degree in a response to an invitation from a high school in Vermillion, South Dakota. Following his PhD pursuit in Iowa, he relocated to Kansas City, serving at Westport High School for two years as the head of its department of speech. In 1935, he started a four-year term in the English Department of the University of Missouri, where he would spend the bulk of his career. After breaking for five years to serve as an assistant and then associate professor of speech at Syracuse University, Reid returned to serve on the faculty of the new Department of Speech and Dramatic Art (now Department of Communication) at the University of Missouri. From 1946 to 1951, Reid served as department chair, a service he repeated from 1965 to 1966.

During his time at the University of Missouri, Reid took occasional visiting professorships at other schools. He served at the University of California in the summer of 1947, at the University of Maryland, Overseas Division in 1952–53, at Louisiana State University and San Diego State College in 1954, at the University of Hawaii in 1957 and the University of Iowa in 1958.

== Service ==
Within the University of Missouri, Reid served in a number of areas. On the committee of and one time acting director of the University of Missouri Press, he was also on the committee of Student Publications. A proponent of campus-based instructional television, which he helping bring to UoM, he moderated both the Showcase series and the Missouri Forum. He was also active among faculty, serving the University Faculty Club for a year in 1945 as president.

He was an active member of the Sigma Delta Chi fraternity and an honorary member of Kappa Tau Alpha and Delta Sigma Rho.

Beyond the confines of the college, Reid was active in many professional organizations. He was executive secretary of the Central States Communication Association in 1937. He founded the New York State Speech Communication Association in 1942 and the Missouri Association of Teachers of Speech in 1943. He served the National Association of Teachers of Speech as its executive secretary from 1945 to 1951. He served as president of the National Communication Association in 1957.

== Research and writing ==
Reid's particular focuses in his research were British rhetoric and public speaking. He collaborated with writers Bower Aly and Wilbur Gilman in writing Fundamentals of Public Speaking, and he also had several works of his own varying from speech textbooks Speaking Well and Teaching Speech, to the autobiographical Professor on the Loose, to the partially autobiographical reflections on small-town life and work Hurry Home Wednesday, and Finally It's Friday. Other notable works include his biography Charles James Fox: A Man of the People and American Public Address: Studies in Honor of Albert Craig Baird, which he edited.

== Honors and legacy ==
Reid was honored many times throughout his career and after. Among them, he received the University of Missouri's Alumni Achievement Award in 1970 and received the Distinguished Teaching Award in 1971. He was selected Sesquicentennial President of the University of Missouri near the date of the University's Columbia Day Tribune.

The National Communication Association recognized him in 1981 with its Distinguished Service Award and in 2002 with its Mentor Award. The Central States Communication Associated inducted him into its Hall of Fame in 2005.

Reid was made a fellow of the Royal Historical Society for the research he completed for his book on Charles James Fox. That book received the Elizabeth G. Andersch Award from Ohio University, the distinguished alumnus award from Grinnell College and the National Communication Association's Golden Anniversary Book Award and Winans-Wichelns Award for Distinguished Scholarship in Rhetoric and Public Address. Hurry Home Wednesday and Professor on the Loose received awards from the Missouri Writers' Guild, with the former also being awarded by the Missouri Library Association.

The University of Missouri dedicated the Loren Reid Library in Switizler Hall in 1995 and created the Loren Reid Distinguished Scholar Lecture Series in 2005 in his honor. The UoM also remembers Reid in a number of academic awards named for him, including the Loren Reid Outstanding Senior Award for Department Service and Leadership and the Loren Reid Outstanding Graduate Student Teaching Award.
