= Fred Pierce Corson =

American Methodist bishop (1896–1985)

Fred Pierce Corson (11 April 1896 – 16 February 1985) was an American bishop of The Methodist Church and the United Methodist Church, elected in 1944. He also distinguished himself as a Methodist pastor and district superintendent; as the twentieth president of Dickinson College, Carlisle, Pennsylvania; and as an ecumenical Christian leader.

== Birth and family ==
Fred was born April 11, 1896, in Millville, New Jersey, the son of Jeremiah and Mary Payne Corson. Jeremiah was a glass manufacturer. Fred married Frances Blount Beamon of Charlotte, North Carolina, in 1922. They had one son, Hampton Payne Corson, who graduated from Dickinson College in 1949 and went on to become a physician.

== Education ==
Corson graduated from Millville High School in 1913 and enrolled in Dickinson College, Carlisle, Pennsylvania. While at Dickinson he was a member of Kappa Sigma fraternity, as well as Omicron Delta Kappa, Tau Kappa Alpha and Tau Delta Kappa. He graduated Dickinson in 1917 with an A.B. degree, cum laude and Phi Beta Kappa. His nickname while in college, spawned by his seriousness, was ironically, in light of later events, "The Bishop."

Fred went on to study at Drew Theological Seminary, Madison, New Jersey, earning a Bachelor of Divinity degree in 1920. He received an M.A. degree from Dickinson also in 1920. He received an honorary D.D. degree from Syracuse University in 1933.

== Ordained ministry ==
Fred entered the ministry of the New York East Annual Conference of the Methodist Episcopal Church. He was ordained in 1919 and was appointed to pastorates on Long Island, New York; in New Haven, Connecticut; and in Brooklyn, New York. He was appointed a District Superintendent in 1929.

== Presidency of Dickinson College ==
The Rev. Dr. Corson was elected the twentieth President of Dickinson College 8 June 1934. He had no previous experience in academic administration. In light of this, he often relied on the President of the Board of Trustees, Boyd Lee Spahr. Corson also operated in a firm and hierarchical fashion in relations with the faculty. Nevertheless, during his decade of presidency, in often difficult times (e.g., during The Great Depression and World War II), Corson gained respect for his careful financial stewardship.

He also reintroduced some of the reforms in services and curriculum his predecessor, Karl Waugh, had proposed. For example, in 1936 he established a student health services program. He reinstated the policy of departmental honors with the requirement of a thesis. During the War, Corson worked hard to maintain enrollment, and was instrumental in Dickinson being chosen in 1943 as the site of a U.S. Army Air Force Aircrew Training Program, a move which helped ensure the fiscal health of the institution during the crisis of war.

== Episcopal ministry ==
The Rev. Dr. Corson was elected Bishop by the 1944 Northeastern Jurisdictional Conference of The Methodist Church. He was assigned the Philadelphia episcopal area, where he served until his retirement in 1968. This election, of course, necessitated his resignation from the Presidency of Dickinson, a move which angered some and reopened old wounds concerning the College's relationship with the Methodist denomination.

By all accounts, Bishop Corson led a sterling career as an Episcopal Leader. He was elected President of the Council of Bishops in 1952. He also served as President of the World Methodist Council in 1961. In 1962 he served as (a non-Catholic) observer at the Second Vatican Ecumenical Council, called by Pope John XXIII and wrote a response to the (Catholic document) "Decree on the Bishops' Pastoral Office in the Church (Christus Dominus). He held private audience several times with Popes.

== Honors ==
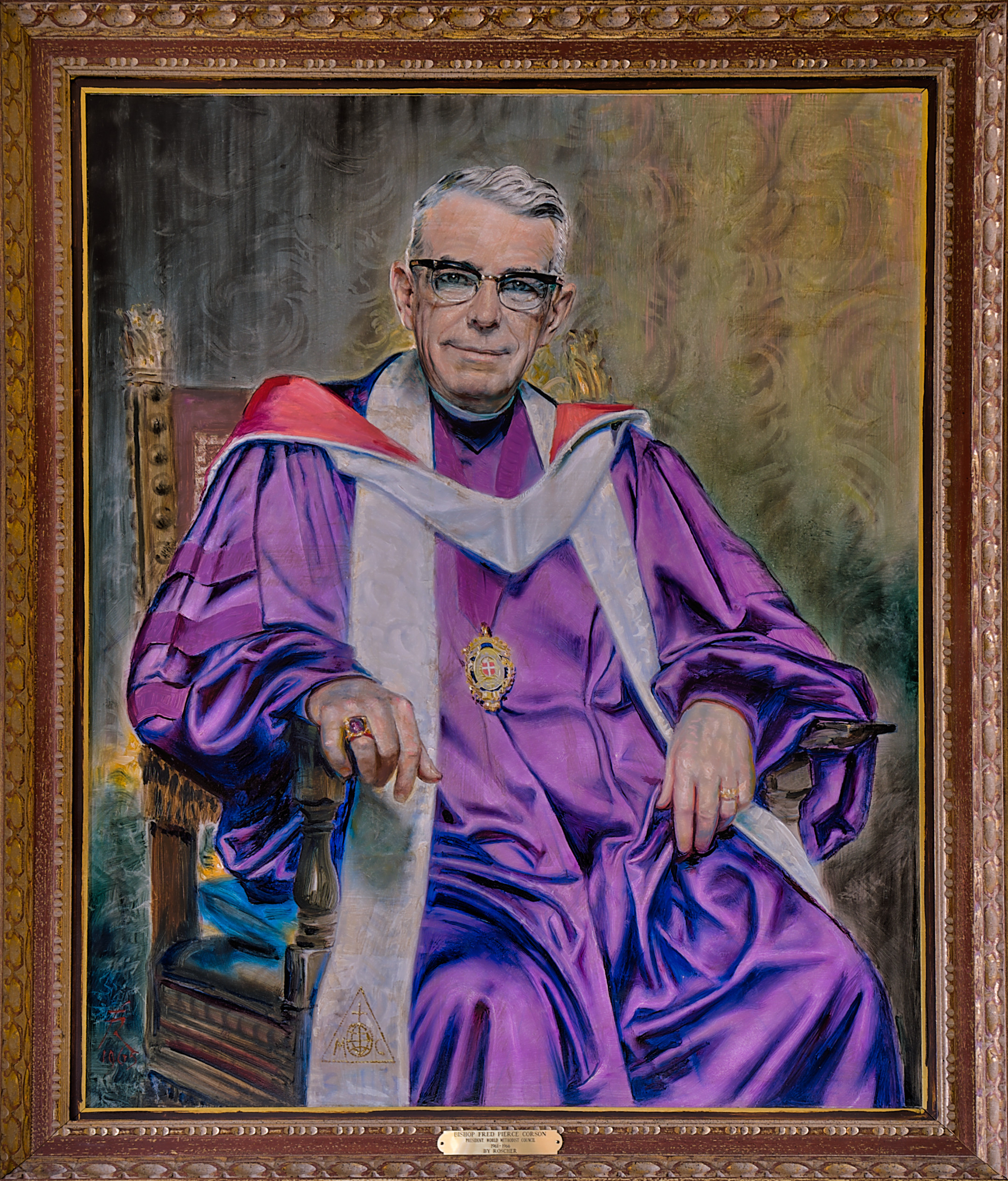
Painting of Bishop Corson on display at the World Methodist Museum, Lake Junaluska, NC

Bishop Corson received honorary degrees from fifty different institutions of higher learning. He was named Kappa Sigma Fraternity's "Man of the Year" in 1951, the first time this honor was bestowed upon a religious leader. He remained a Trustee of Dickinson College as well as of other institutions.

Bishop Corson died February 16, 1985, in St. Petersburg, Florida, from a cerebral hemorrhage suffered following a fall.

== Selected writings ==
- Introduction, John Wesley's New Testament (Anniversary Edition), Philadelphia, the John C. Winston Co., 1938.

== See also ==
- List of bishops of the United Methodist Church

== Sources ==
- Encyclopedia Dickinsonia: Fred Pierce Corson
- Leete, Frederick DeLand, Methodist Bishops. Nashville, The Methodist Publishing House, 1948.
