= Thomas L. Martin =

American soil agronomist and academic (1885–1958)

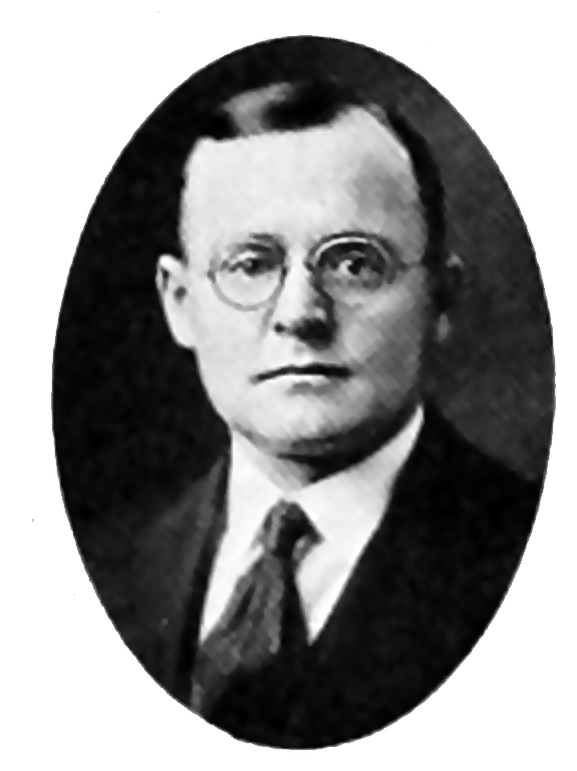
- Born: November 21, 1885; Lancashire, England
- Died: June 16, 1958 (aged 72); Provo, Utah, United States
- Education: Cornell University
- Spouse(s): Hattie Paxman (1911–1950 her death); Irma Patch (1952–1958 his death)

Thomas L. Martin (November 21, 1885 – June 16, 1958) was a renowned soil agronomist. He was a professor at Brigham Young University (BYU) and became the Dean of the College of Applied Sciences.

== Early life and education ==
Thomas "Tommy" Lysons Martin was born in Lancashire, England on November 21, 1885, to James and Mary Ann Martin. His family was very poor, and 4 of his older siblings had died of malnutrition. His father was a miner, while his mother worked in a factory. As a baby, Martin was left with a wet nurse who, unknown to his parents, left him to sit in a maggot-filled, decomposing nursery chair for most of the day. Eventually his mother found maggots on Martin as well. When he was 2, his family moved to Wombwell, England. Due to poor living conditions, he was sick as a child and didn't walk until he was almost 6 years old. His parents joined the Church of Jesus Christ of Latter-day Saints (LDS Church) in 1891. He studied in school, although he struggled, until 1898 when he dropped out in order to work in the coal mines. He was mechanically inclined and keen at fixing things and even opened his own business that allowed him to quit his job at the coal mine, although he always dreamed of becoming a teacher.

Martin immigrated to the United States with an LDS Church missionary in April 1902, moving to Provo, Utah. He would go on to obtain citizenship in 1922. He worked at a dairy for three years in Provo. His family later followed in 1904, and Martin moved to live with them in American Fork, Utah, where his dad opened a jewelry shop. Martin graduated from high school in 1908 and attended BYU. While still in school, he married Hattie Paxman on June 7, 1911, in the Salt Lake Temple. While at BYU, Martin was involved in debate and was a member of Tau Kappa Alpha, BYU's first national honor fraternity. He also participated in several operas, although he did not receive leading roles due to his short height. Martin graduated as the valedictorian from BYU the following year. After graduating, Martin became a principal at the Big Horn Academy.

After three years at the Academy, Martin entered Cornell University in 1915 to obtain his doctorate degree. He studied soil technology, plant physiology and bacteriology, and was even an assistant in the soil technology department. After one year, Martin was out of money and took a job as a principal at Emery Academy in Castledale, Utah, returning to Cornell the following year. He graduated in 1919 with a PhD in soils. Cornell offered him a position there, but required him to sign a document that stated he was not a member of the LDS Church. Martin declined, and went on to become a renowned soil agronomist.

== Career ==
After obtaining his PhD, Martin got a job as a teacher at Millard Academy in Hinckley, Utah. Shortly after moving to Millard County, he was also hired as the soil man for the Utah-Idaho Sugar Company. He was offered a job at the University of South Carolina, but followed Spencer W. Kimball's counsel not to take it. The following week, he was offered a job position at BYU.

Martin was hired at BYU by school president Franklin S. Harris in 1921. Martin became a member of the Agricultural Department and was part of BYU's faculty for 37 years. He began teaching with only 3 agronomy students, but within 4 years had 12 students graduating. In 1927, Martin became the president of Utah Academy of Sciences, and also created classes in bacteriology. This one class later expanded into a full master's program under Martin's direction. While teaching at BYU, he was responsible for creating classes in landscape architecture in 1936. He became the dean of the College of Applied Sciences in 1935.

Martin was known for encouraging students to further their education and for helping them find jobs after graduation. He helped place students at other universities for graduate school. Martin even helped place Ezra Taft Benson at Iowa State University in 1927. By the time of his death, he had helped 178 students into graduate school.

Martin wrote the book Decomposition of Green Manures at Different Stages of Growth. He was also a featured speaker at many agronomy conventions throughout his career. Martin was a member of the Provo Chamber of Commerce Agriculture Committee as well as the Health and Sanitation Committee.

== Awards and recognition ==
Martin was awarded the BYU Distinguished Services Award in 1940. In 1950, Martin was one of the most successful teachers of agriculture as noted by the American Society of Agronomy. He was also awarded the Karl G. Maeser Distinguished Teaching Award from BYU in 1958. The university dedicated the Thomas L. Martin Building after him, which is now known as the "MARB." Martin was also featured in American Men of Science and Who's Who in American Education.

== Personal life ==
His wife, Hattie, died in 1950, and Martin left teaching to go on an eight-week trip to Hawaii due to his grief; however, he returned after only three weeks. In 1952, Martin later married Irma Patch. He died in Provo. on June 16, 1958.
