= Marion Janet Harron =

American judge

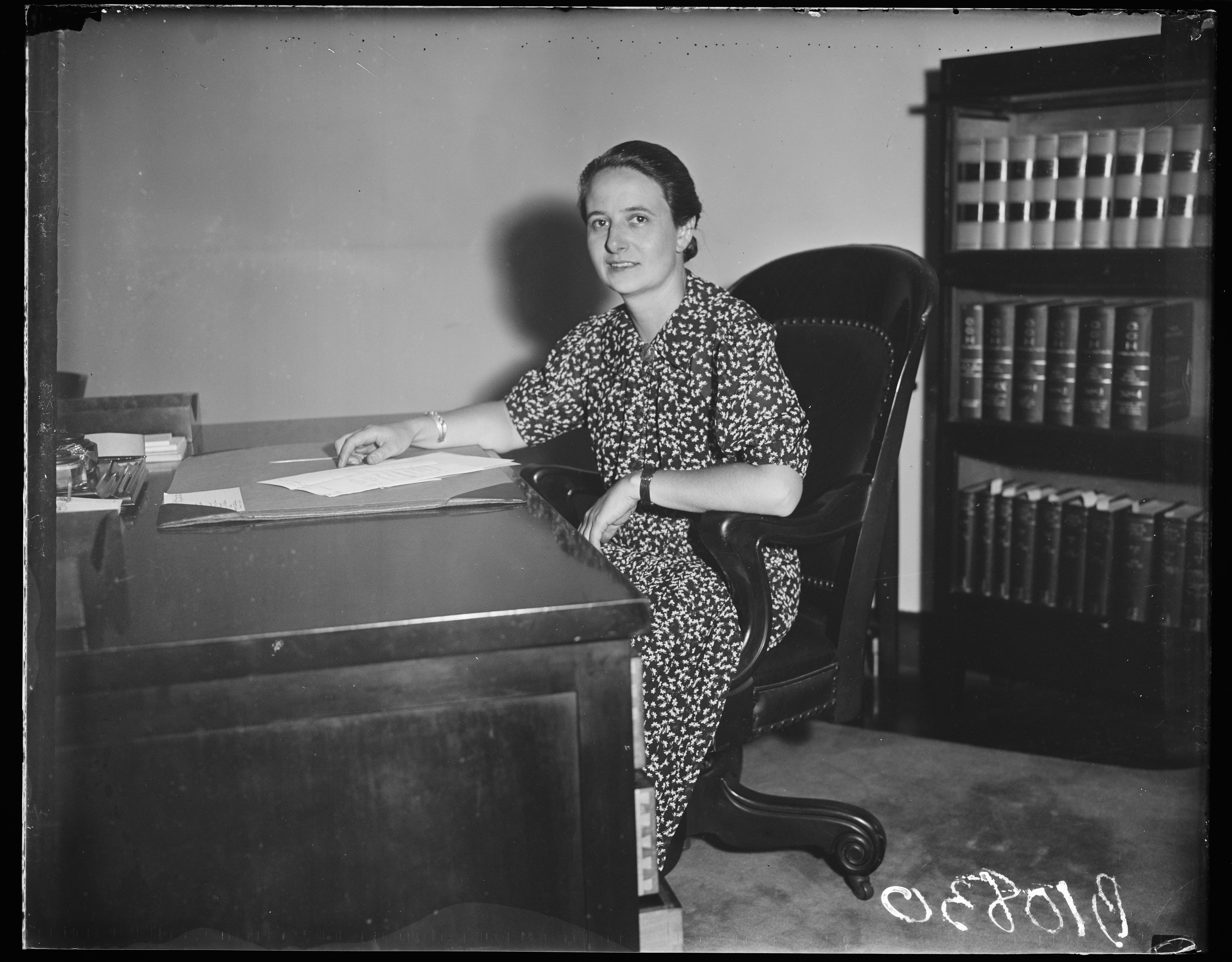
- Marion J. Harron in 1936

United States Tax Court judge
- In office 1936–1970

Personal details
- Born: September 3, 1903; San Francisco, California
- Died: September 26, 1972

Marion Janet Harron (September 3, 1903 – September 26, 1972) was an American lawyer and United States Tax Court judge from 1936 to 1970. She is also known for her five-year affair with Lorena Hickok. Harron was a frequent visitor at the White House during the 1940s.

== Early life and education ==
Harron was born in San Francisco, California, the daughter of George Olcott Brown, a jeweler, and Mary Jane (Minnie) Little Brown. Her parents divorced in 1904. Her stepfather Howard Harron was a lawyer; the Harrons divorced in 1916. She graduated from Girls High School in San Francisco in 1920. She earned a bachelor's degree at the University of California in 1924, and completed a law degree at Berkeley's Boalt Hall in 1926, with a thesis on the opinions of Louis Brandeis. She was a member of Phi Beta Kappa and Delta Sigma Rho.

== Career ==
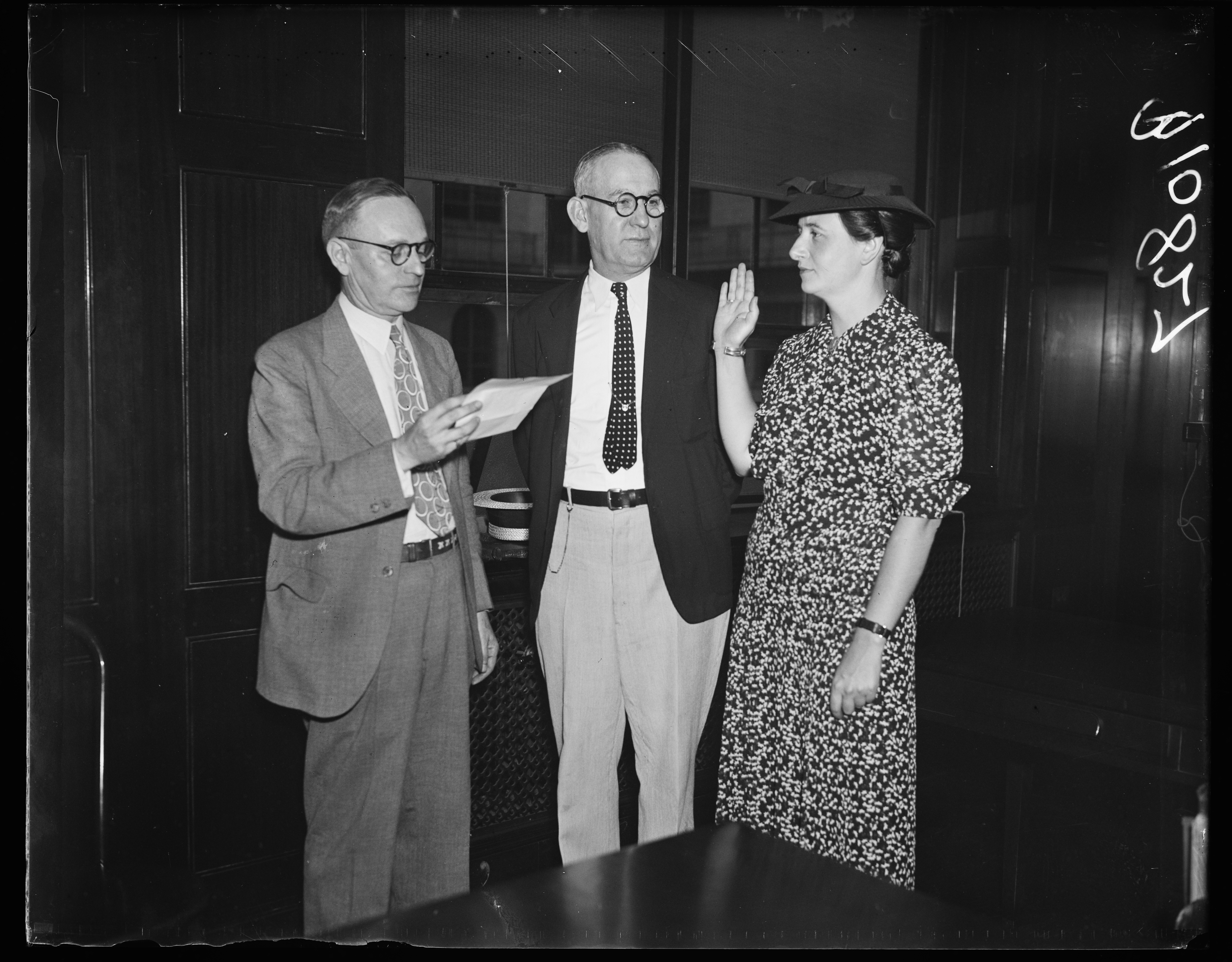
Harron became a member of U.S. Board of Tax Appeals. Washington, D.C., July 29, 1936; photo from the Library of Congress

During law school in the 1920s, Harron was a teaching fellow in the economics department at the University of California, and was on the staff of the California Industrial Welfare Commission. She passed the California bar in 1926. She joined the Law Research Institute at Johns Hopkins University in 1928, and co-edited the institute's Current research in law for the academic year 1928-1929 with legal scholar Herman Oliphant.

Harron specialized in corporate law and trusts, working on cases involving bank liquidations and real estate in New York City, from 1929 to 1933. She was assistant counsel with the National Recovery Administration from 1933 to 1935, and with the Resettlement Administration from 1935 to 1936.

In 1936 Harron was the second woman appointed to the United States Board of Tax Appeals, succeeding Annabel Matthews. In 1940 she was named one of the "Ten Most Accomplished Women in the United States Born Since 1900", alongside Clare Booth Luce, Helen Hayes, Marian Anderson, and Anne Morrow Lindbergh. "Most women are taxpayers, and there's no reason why women lawyers should not specialize in taxation," she said in 1941. She was mentioned as a candidate for a federal judge post in San Francisco in 1939. After a 1949 Senate confirmation hearing she was reappointed as a judge of the Tax Court of the United States, though there were questions about her judicial temperament and "reputation for dictatorial, arbitrary, and capricious action upon the bench". One of her last rulings was against Doris Day, when she found the actress liable for over $400,000 in back taxes in 1970.

Harron work involved national travel, hearing tax cases in various cities, which gave her opportunities to speak to women's organizations, including the National Association of Women Lawyers. She spoke at the 1949 Seneca Falls Day event of the National Woman's Party.

== Personal life ==
Harron had a five-year affair with journalist Lorena Hickok, ending in 1945. Harron died in 1972. A memorial service was held in the Bethlehem Chapel of the Washington National Cathedral.
