= Delta Sigma Rho =

American honor society for public speaking

- ΔΣΡ
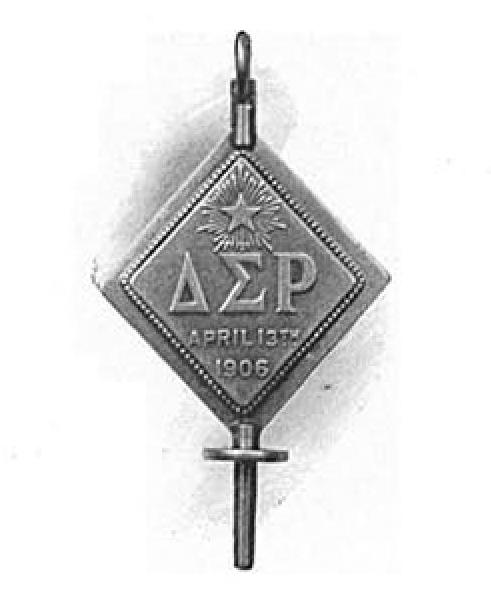
- Founded: April 13, 1906; 120 years ago Chicago, Illinois
- Type: Honor
- Affiliation: ACHS
- Status: Merged
- Merge date: August 18, 1963
- Successor: Delta Sigma Rho-Tau Kappa Alpha
- Emphasis: Forensics
- Scope: National
- Motto: "Oratory, the key to power" and "Honor for merit"
- Colors: Maroon and Black
- Publication: The Gavel
- Chapters: 85
- Members: 20,100 lifetime
- Headquarters: DePauw University; Greencastle, Indiana; United States

Delta Sigma Rho (ΔΣΡ) was a collegiate honor society devoted to the promotion of public speaking (forensics). It merged with Tau Kappa Alpha, a similar organization, to form Delta Sigma Rho-Tau Kappa Alpha in 1963.

== History ==
Delta Sigma Rho was founded in Chicago on April 13, 1906. The founders at the organizing convention included representatives from University of Michigan, University of Minnesota, University of Iowa, University of Wisconsin, University of Illinois, University of Nebraska, University of Chicago and Northwestern University. The call for the meeting was issued by Professor Eugene E. McDermott of the University of Minnesota. The idea of the society came out of the simultaneous conception of the idea by McDermont and Professor Henry E. Gordon of University of Iowa.

The purpose of Delta Sigma Rho was "to encourage sincere and effective public speaking". Its 1920 constitution stated that charters could only be granted to institutions that had participated in intercollegiate forensic contests for five years.

The society became a member of the Association of College Honor Societies in 1937. In 1963, Delta Sigma Rho had 85 active chapters and 20,100 members. Its headquarters was located at DePauw University in Greencastle, Indiana.

Delta Sigma Rho and Tau Kappa Alpha merged on August 18, 1963. The merged group adopted the name Delta Sigma Rho-Tau Kappa Alpha.

== Symbols ==
Delta Sigma Rho emblem was a diamond-shaped key with a star at the top, the Greek letters ΔΣΡ, and the date of the organization of the society (April 13, 1906) in relief. Its mottos are "Oratory, the key to power" and "Honor for merit". Its colors were maroon and black. Its publication was The Gavel, first published in 1912.

== Members ==
To be eligible for membership, students had to be active in intercollegiate forensic contest and had to complete their sophomore year. In addition, they had to be in the top 35 per cent of their class.

== Chapters ==
In 1963, Delta Sigma Rho had 85 active chapters.

== Notable members ==
- Paul R. Anderson, president of Chatham University and Temple University
- Samuel H. Blackmer, associate justice of the Vermont Supreme Court
- Bennett Champ Clark, United States senator from Missouri and a circuit judge of the District of Columbia Circuit.
- Louis B. Costello, general manager and president of The Lewiston Daily Sun and Lewiston Evening Journal
- Garfield V. Cox, economist and dean of the University of Chicago School of Business
- John P. Davis, co-founded the National Negro Congress and founder of Our World magazine
- David Fellman, political scientist and constitutional scholar
- Rudolph Fisher, physician, radiologist, novelist, short story writer, dramatist, musician, and orator
- Marion Janet Harron, lawyer and United States Tax Court judge
- Asher Hobson, agricultural economist
- John C. Holland, Los Angeles City Council member
- Richard C. Hunter, United States Senator and Nebraska State Attorney General
- Wellington Koo, diplomat and statesman of the Republic of China
- Frank Licht, Governor of Rhode Island, associate justice of the Rhode Island Superior Court, and the Rhode Island Senate
- Benjamin Mays, Baptist minister and American rights leader
- Archie Palmer, 8th president of the University of Tennessee at Chattanooga
- Stanley M. Powell, member of the Michigan House of Representatives
- Marshall Russell Reed, Bishop of The Methodist Church and the United Methodist Church
- Loren Reid, communication professor and the chair of the Department of Communication. at the University of Missouri
- Samuel Rosenman, first White House Counsel and presidential speechwriter who coined the term "New Deal"
- Tucker P. Smith, economics professor at Brookwood Labor College and Olivet College and the Socialist Party of America's nominee for Vice President in the 1948

== See also ==
- Competitive debate in the United States
- Extemporaneous speaking
