= Alpha Phi Epsilon =

American honorary forensic fraternity

- ΑΦΕ
- Founded: April 29, 1918; 108 years ago Birmingham, Alabama
- Type: Honor society
- Affiliation: Independent
- Status: Merged
- Merge date: 1935
- Successor: Tau Kappa Alpha
- Emphasis: Literary
- Scope: National
- Colors: Garnet and Green
- Flower: Red rose
- Publication: The Garnet and Green
- Headquarters: Mobile, Alabama; United States

Alpha Phi Epsilon (ΑΦΕ) was an American intercollegiate honorary literary and forensic fraternity. It was founded in Birmingham, Alabama in 1918 by representatives of literary societies from thirteen Southern universities and colleges. It merged into Tau Kappa Alpha in 1935.

== History ==
In 1919, the Philomathic Literary Society at the University of Mississippi came up with the idea of creating a national organization for literary societies; member Roy L. Smart invited similar organizations to an organizational meeting. Between April 29 and May 2, 1918, representatives of literary societies from nine Southern colleges and universities met at the Civic Association's headquarters in Birmingham, Alabama to discuss the formation of form an honorary literary and forensic fraternity. The result was Alpha Phi Epsilon National Literary Society, created to advance the work of literary societies and make this work more effective. Its purpose was "to promote the work of literary societies in general and to honor those men who have attained distinction in society work".

The founding instituitions were Auburn University, Emory University, Howard College, John B. Stetson University, Richmond College, Southwestern Presbyterian University, the University of Alabama, the University of Mississippi, the University of Tennessee. Centre College, Maryville College, Millsaps College, and the University of Kentucky participated in the founding meeting by letter and also became charter members. Clemson University, the University of Georgia, the University of Texas, and the University of Virginia also were founders of the fraternity.

The April 29 meeting included creating the constitution and establishing membership requirements for Alpha Phi Epsilon. The fraternity was governed operated by an executive council that was elected at biennial annual meetings. The executive council consisted of a grand president, vice-president, secretary-treasurer, and two councilors. Roy L. Smart was its first grand president.

Alpha Phi Epsilon chapters were originally formed from one literary or debating society from each charter institution. However, male student members were admitted from all literary societies at institutions with a chapter. The fraternity expanded to other colleges and universities, mostly located in the Southern and Western United States. Only class "A" colleges and universities were allowed to have chapters.

By April 1919, Alpha Phi Epsilon had grown to thirteen chapters. It had also received a letter of endorsement from former United States President William Howard Taft. The fraternity held an annual meeting on April 19, 1919, in Auburn, Alabama. Dr. R. Johnson of the University of Mississippi was elected president.

After World War I, it was determined that this structure would not be able to flourish. On April 23 and 24, 1920, Alpha Phi Epsilon's national convention held at the University of Tennessee in Knoxville, Tennessee. This meeting transformed the nature of the society, expanding membership to include those from all recognized literary societies and women. By the 1921 annual meeting, at the University of Mississippi on May 8 and 9, the fraternity had chartered thirty chapters.

The fraternity's national headquarters were in Mobile, Alabama. In the spring of 1935, Alpha Phi Epsilon merged into Tau Kappa Alpha.

== Symbols ==
The badge of Alpha Phi Epsilon was gold and displayed the fraternity's symbols. Its colors are garnet and green. Its flower was the red rose. The fraternity's quarterly publication was The Garnet and Green.

Alpha Phi Epsilon presented a service award that was the fraternity's badge, mounted on a rayed background.

== Membership ==
At the 1920 annual meeting, standards for membership in Alpha Phi Epsilon were set to require 1.5 years of membership and attendance in a literary society, participation in at least five debates, presentation of at least two original orations, and a written parliamentary law exam (requiring an 85 percent grade). Individual chapters could add additional requirements. There were three classes of members: active, alumni, and honorary.

== Chapters ==
Alpha Phi Epsilon chapters through 1930 were as follows, with inactive chapters and institutions indicated in italics.

Chapter	Charter date and range	Institution	Location	Status	Ref.
Alpha	April 29, 1918	University of Alabama	Tuscaloosa, Alabama		(Note: Chapter formed by the Philomathic literary society.)
Beta	April 29, 1918	Auburn University	Auburn, Alabama		(Note: Formed by the Wirt Literary Society.)
Gamma	April 29, 1918	Emory University	Atlanta, Georgia		(Note: Chapter formed by Phi Gamma, a local literary society.)
Delta	April 29, 1918	Howard College	Birmingham, Alabama		(Note: Chapter formed by the Franklin Literary Society.) (Note: The chapter's charter was withdrawn when the campus's literary societies went defunct.)
Epsilon	April 29, 1918	University of Mississippi	Oxford, Mississippi		(Note: Chapter formed by the Hermaean literary society.)
Zeta	April 29, 1918	Richmond College	Richmond, Virginia		(Note: Chapter formed by Mu Sigma Rho, a local literary society.)
Eta	April 29, 1918	Southwestern Presbyterian University	Memphis, Tennessee		(Note: Chapter formed by the Stewart Literary Society.)
Theta	April 29, 1918	National headquarters	Mobile, Alabama		
Iota	April 29, 1918	Stetson University	DeLand, Florida		(Note: Chapter formed by the Varsity Club.)
Kappa	April 29, 1918	University of Tennessee	Knoxville, Tennessee		(Note: Chapter formed by Chi Delta, a local literary society.)
Lambda	1918	Centre College	Danville, Kentucky		
Mu	1918	Maryville College	Maryville, Tennessee		
Nu	March 1920	Millsaps College	Jackson, Mississippi		(Note: Chapter formed by Galloway Literary Society.)
XI	January 22, 1920 – 1923	University of Arkansas	Fayetteville, Arkansas	Inactive	
Omicron	1921	University of Florida	Gainesville, Florida		
Pi	March 1921	University of Texas	Austin, Texas		
Rho	1921	Bethany College	Bethany, West Virginia		
Sigma	1921	University of Southern California	Los Angeles, California		
Tau	March 19, 1921	Rollins College	Winter Park, Florida		(Note: The chapter was established by the Delphic Literary Society.)
Upsilon	1923–1928	Colorado Agricultural College	Fort Collins, Colorado	Inactive	(Note: Chapter formed by the Philo Literary Club.)
Phi	1923	Davidson College	Davidson, North Carolina		(Note: Chapter formed by Gavel and Forum, a local honorary literary society.)
Chi	1924	University of California	Berkeley, California		
Psi	1925	Vanderbilt University	Nashville, Tennessee		
Omega	1926	Southern College	Lakeland, Florida		
Alpha Alpha	1926	Sewanee: The University of the South	Sewanee, Tennessee		
Alpha Beta	1926	Union University	Jackson, Tennessee		
Alpha Gamma	1927	Mississippi Agricultural and Mechanical College	Starkville, Mississippi		
Alpha Delta	1927	University of Illinois			

== See also ==
- Professional fraternities and sororities
