= Delta Sigma Rho-Tau Kappa Alpha =

American honor society for public speaking

- ΔΣΡ-ΤΚΑ
- Founded: August 18, 1963; 63 years ago Denver, Colorado
- Type: Honor
- Former affiliation: ACHS
- Status: Defunct
- Defunct date: Spring 2019
- Emphasis: Forensics
- Scope: National
- Publication: Speaker and Gavel
- Chapters: 198
- Members: 60,000 lifetime
- Headquarters: Colorado Springs, Colorado 80903; United States

Delta Sigma Rho-Tau Kappa Alpha (ΔΣΡ-ΤΚΑ) was a collegiate honor society devoted to the promotion of public speaking (forensics). It formed from the merger of two similar organizations, Delta Sigma Rho and Tau Kappa Alpha, in 1963. The society became inactive in 2019.

== History ==
Delta Sigma Rho-Tau Kappa Alpha formed from the merger of Delta Sigma Rho and Tau Kappa Alpha on August 18, 1963, in Denver, Colorado. Delta Sigma Rho was founded in Chicago, Illinois on April 13, 1906. Tau Kappa Alpha was organized on May 13, 1908, at Indianapolis, Indiana.

The purpose of Delta Sigma Rho-Tau Kappa Alpha was:

To promote interest in, and to award suitable recognition for, excellence in forensics and original speaking; and to foster respect for, and an appreciation of, freedom of speech as a vital element of democracy.

It was a member of the Association of College Honor Societies, with both Delta Sigma Rho and Tau Kappa Alpha being active members at the time of their merger. By 1991, the society had 192 active chapters and 58,000 initiates. It had 198 active chapters and 58,500 in 2010.

Delta Sigma Rho-Tau Kappa Alpha announced its dissolution in the spring 2019 issue of the Speaker & Gavel. Its remained funds were given to the National Forensic Association in April 2019. Novice Nationals Forensic Association agreed to continue publishing the magazine.

== Symbols ==
The Delta Sigma Rho-Tau Kappa Alpha's gold key featured the Greek letters ΔΣΡ and ΤΚΑ on a black background, with a five-pointed star in between. Its publication was the Speaker and Gavel, a name created by combining the former publications of the two groups.

== Activities ==
Delta Sigma Rho-Tau Kappa Alpha sponsored national and regional tournaments annually, where students debated national issues. Its last national tournament was held in 2013. The society also held national conventions and presented annual awards, including the Speaker of the Year, the Spirit of Forensics Team Award, Top Forensic Publication, the Coach of the Year Award, and DSR-TKA Forensics Scholars. It published a textbook, Argumentation and Debate. Its scholarly publication was the Speaker and Gavel, published online in later years.

== Membership ==
To join, members must have participated in two years of intercollegiate forensics or similar faculty-supervised speaking activities. Also, potential members were required to be in the top 35 percent of their class.

=== Notable members ===
- Marion Janet Harron, judge
- Arthur J. Ruland, politician
- Annette Shelby, academic

== Chapters ==
Delta Sigma Rho-Tau Kappa Alpha had 198 active chapters in 2010.

== See also ==
- Honor cords
- Competitive debate in the United States
- Extemporaneous speaking
