= Tau Kappa Alpha =

American honor society for public speaking

- ΤΚΑ
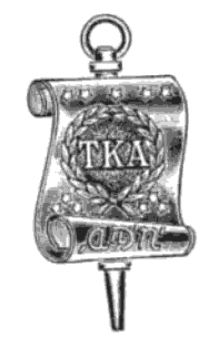
- Founded: May 13, 1908; 118 years ago Indianapolis, Indiana
- Type: Honor
- Affiliation: ACHS
- Status: Merged
- Merge date: August 18, 1963
- Successor: Delta Sigma Rho-Tau Kappa Alpha
- Emphasis: Forensics
- Scope: National
- Motto: "Intelligent, Responsible, and Free Speech in a Free Society"
- Colors: Light Purple and Dark Purple
- Publication: The Speaker
- Chapters: 148
- Members: 22,500 lifetime
- Headquarters: University of Michigan; Ann Arbor, Michigan; United States

Tau Kappa Alpha (ΤΚΑ) was a collegiate honor society devoted to the promotion of public speaking (forensics). Established in 1908, it merged with Delta Sigma Rho, a similar society, to form Delta Sigma Rho-Tau Kappa Alpha in 1963

== History ==
Tau Kappa Alpha was organized on May 13, 1908, at Indianapolis, Indiana, primarily through the efforts of Oswald Ryan, a student at Butler University and Hugh Thomas Miller who was the Lieutenant Governor of Indiana. They were assisted by James J. Boyle, G. Claris Adams, Herbert R. Hyman, William Heilman, and Roger W. Wallace.

The organization of the group was unusual. Charters were not granted to institutions but to eligible persons in each state upon the petition of students from a representative institution or institutions in such state. Expansion within that state was entrusted to the charter members of the state chapter. This plan aimed to enable the election of desirable men from colleges not large enough or perhaps not strong enough to warrant the installation of or to maintain a separate chapter. The structure was found to be impracticable. In a 1914 convention, the society was reorganized and chapters were given an independent existence in the usual way.

Women were admitted into Tau Kappa Alpha in 1916. The professional fraternity, Phi Delta Gamma, and the honor fraternity Alpha Phi Epsilon both merged into Tau Kappa Alpha in 1935. The society became a member of the Association of College Honor Societies in 1955. In 1963, it had 101 active chapters, 47 inactive chapters, and 22,500 initiates. Its headquarters were located at the University of Michigan in Ann Arbor, Michigan.

Tau Kappa Alpha and Delta Sigma Rho merged to form Delta Sigma Rho-Tau Kappa Alpha on August 18, 1963.

== Symbols ==
The Greek letters ΤΚΑ stood form "Honor for Merit". Its motto was "Intelligent, Responsible, and Free Speech in a Free Society". The society's emblem was key in the shape of a scroll, featuring the Greek number of for the year of establishment and the Greek letters ΤΚΑ, surrounded by eleven stars representing the eleven founders and a laurel wreath of reward. Its colors were light and dark purple. Its quarterly publication was The Speaker, first published in 1914.

== Membership ==
The principal qualification for membership was participation in an intercollegiate oratorical or debating contest. Members were elected by the several state councils in their respective states. Alumni of accredited institutions could also be elected.

== Chapters ==
Tau Kappa Alpha chartered 148 chapters.

== Notable members ==
- Guy Potter Benton, president of Upper Iowa University, Miami University, the University of Vermont, and the University of the Philippines
- Herman T. Briscoe, professor of chemistry at Indiana University
- Russell L. Caldwell, historian and academic
- Fred Pierce Corson, bishop of The Methodist Church and the United Methodist Church
- Horace Hall Edwards, Virginia House of Delegates and mayor of Richmond, Virginia
- Paul Elliott Martin, bishop of The Methodist Church and the United Methodist Church
- Thomas L. Martin, soil agronomist and professor and dean of the College of Applied Sciences at Brigham Young University
- Edward J. O'Neill, United States Army General
- Harold B. Singleton, Virginia House of Delegates and judge in Lynchburg, Bedford County, and Amherst County
- William Angie Smith, bishop of The Methodist Church and the United Methodist Church
- Matthew Lyle Spencer, president of the University of Washington and the dean of the School of Journalism at Syracuse University
- Robert Whitehead, Virginia House of Delegates

== See also ==
- Honor cords
- Competitive debate in the United States
- Extemporaneous speaking
