= Kappa Alpha Pi (pre-law) =

Gender-inclusive pre-law fraternity

- ΚΑΠ
- Founded: October 9, 2007; 19 years ago University of Michigan
- Type: Professional
- Affiliation: Independent
- Status: Active
- Emphasis: Law and Government
- Scope: National
- Pillars: Professionalism, philanthropy, and brotherhood
- Colors: Navy blue and Silver
- Symbol: Gavel, book of knowledge, and torch
- Mascot: Phoenix
- Chapters: 80 Chartered
- Headquarters: Chicago, Illinois; United States
- Website: www.kapinational.com

Kappa Alpha Pi (ΚΑΠ or KAPi) is a gender-inclusive pre-law fraternity that started in 2007 at the University of Michigan.

== History ==
In 2007, undergraduate members of Phi Alpha Delta at the University of Michigan disaffiliated from the international pre-law fraternity to form a new "close-knit community" at the chapter level. These pre-law students created Kappa Alpha Pi on October 9, 2007. The purpose of Kappa Alpha Pi is "to foster knowledge of the law for undergraduate students; to provide service to the greater community and campus; to promote a strong sense of fraternalism among members; to uphold the ideals and integrity of Kappa Alpha Pi Pre-Law Co-ed Fraternity; so that each member may advance his or her intellect while contributing actively to the well-being of others."

In 2009, the Alpha chapter of Phi Alpha Delta at UCLA also withdrew from the national pre-law fraternity. It formed the Beta chapter of Kappa Alpha Pi. Similarly, the Theta chapter at University of California, Davis also formed from a pre-existing Phi Alpha Delta chapter.

Although the fraternity expanded to other campuses, each chapter follows the model of the Alpha chapter. Each chapter has an executive board that leads the fraternity and its pledge classes.

== Symbols ==
The Kappa Alpha Pi crest features a shield decorated with a gavel, the Book of Knowledge, and a torch that symbolize law and justice. At the base of the shield is a scroll with the fraternity's name. Above the shield is the Wreath of Victory and a phoenix which represents the fraternity's history.

The fraternity's colors are navy blue, symbolizing harmony and steadfastness, and silver which symbolizes intelligence, maturity, modesty, and security. Its pillars are professionalism, philanthropy, and brotherhood.

== Activities ==
Chapters hold weekly or bi-weekly meetings with guest speakers. Individual chapters plan their own campus programs and offer assistance with preparing for the Law School Admission Test (LSAT) and law school application, host resume workshops, and offer mentorship programs with law school students. The fraternity also does philanthropic work, such as fundraising for local charities and partnering with legal clinics and legal aid nonprofit organizations.

== Chapters ==
Following is a list of Kappa Alpha Pi chapters, with active chapters indicated in bold and inactive chapters in italics.

| Chapter | Charter date and range | Institution | Location | Status | Ref. |
|---|---|---|---|---|---|
| **Alpha** | October 9, 2007 | University of Michigan | Ann Arbor, Michigan | Active | (Note: Formed from a chapter of Phi Alpha Delta.) |
| **Beta** | 2009 | University of California, Los Angeles | Los Angeles, California | Active | (Note: Formed from the Alpha chapter of Phi Alpha Delta Pre-Law Fraternity, established in 2002.) |
| **Gamma** | 2010 | University of California, Riverside | Riverside, California | Active | |
| **Delta** | May 7, 2011 | Cornell University | Ithaca, New York | Active | |
| **Epsilon** | 2011 | Chapman University | Orange, California | Active | |
| Zeta | 2012 | University at Albany, SUNY | Albany, New York | Inactive | |
| **Eta** | 2013 | Michigan State University | East Lansing, Michigan | Active | |
| Theta | 2014 | University of California, Davis | Davis, California | Inactive | |
| **Iota** | 2014 | University of California, Berkeley | Berkeley, California | Active | |
| **Kappa** | 2018 | University of California, San Diego | San Diego, California | Active | |
| **Lambda** | 2019 | University of Tennessee | Knoxville, Tennessee | Active | |
| **Mu** | 2019 | University of Illinois Urbana-Champaign | Champaign, Illinois | Active | |
| Nu | October 15, 2020 | Lincoln University | Jefferson City, Missouri | Inactive | |
| **Xi** | 2023 | Emory University | Atlanta, Georgia | Active | |
| **Omicron** | 2023 | University of Southern California | Los Angeles, California | Active | |
| **Pi** | 2023 | George Mason University | Fairfax, Virginia | Active | |
| **Rho** | 2023 | Appalachian State University | Boone, North Carolina | Active | |
| **Sigma** | 2023 | Clemson University | Clemson, South Carolina | Active | |
| **Tau** | 2023 | University of Kentucky | Lexington, Kentucky | Active | |
| **Upsilon** | 2023 | University of Georgia | Athens, Georgia | Active | |
| **Phi** | 2023 | University of Arkansas | Fayetteville, Arkansas | Active | |
| **Chi** | 2023 | North Carolina State University | Raleigh, North Carolina | Active | |
| **Psi** | 2023 | University of Virginia | Charlottesville, Virginia | Active | |
| **Omega** | 2023 | Auburn University | Auburn, Alabama | Active | |
| **Alpha Alpha** | 2023 | University of Louisville | Louisville, Kentucky | Active | |
| **Alpha Beta** | 2023 | University of Mississippi | Oxford, Mississippi | Active | |
| **Alpha Gamma** | 2023 | Georgetown University | Washington, D.C. | Active | |
| **Alpha Delta** | 2023 | George Washington University | Washington, D.C. | Active | |
| **Alpha Epsilon** | 2023 | Wake Forest University | Winston-Salem, North Carolina | Active | |
| **Alpha Zeta** | 2023 | Texas Christian University | Fort Worth, Texas | Active | |
| **Alpha Eta** | 2023 | University of West Florida | Pensacola, Florida | Active | |
| **Alpha Theta** | 2023 | Washington University in St. Louis | St. Louis, Missouri | Active | |
| **Alpha Iota** | 2023 | University of Richmond | Richmond, Virginia | Active | |
| **Alpha Kappa** | 2024 | College of Charleston | Charleston, South Carolina | Active | |
| **Alpha Lambda** | 2024 | Saint Louis University | St. Louis, Missouri | Active | |
| **Alpha Mu** | 2024 | Pennsylvania State University | University Park, Pennsylvania | Active | |
| **Alpha Nu** | 2024 | Murray State University | Murray, Kentucky | Active | |
| **Alpha Xi** | 2024 | Miami University | Oxford, Ohio | Active | |
| **Alpha Omicron** | 2024 | University of Pittsburgh | Pittsburgh, Pennsylvania | Active | |
| **Alpha Pi** | 2024 | Georgia Institute of Technology | Atlanta, Georgia | Active | |
| **Alpha Rho** | 2024 | University of Illinois, Chicago | Chicago, Illinois | Active | |
| **Alpha Sigma** | 2024 | Ohio University | Athens, Ohio | Active | |
| **Alpha Tau** | 2024 | University of Alabama | Tuscaloosa, Alabama | Active | |
| **Alpha Upsilon** | 2024 | University of North Carolina Wilmington | Wilmington, North Carolina | Active | |
| **Alpha Phi** | 2024 | Louisiana State University | Baton Rouge, Louisiana | Active | |
| **Alpha Chi** | 2024 | Vanderbilt University | Nashville, Tennessee | Active | |
| **Alpha Psi** | 2025 | Florida State University | Tallahassee, Florida | Active | |
| **Alpha Omega** | 2025 | University of Delaware | Newark, Delaware | Active | |
| **Beta Alpha** | Spring 2025 | Texas A&M University | College Station, Texas | Active | |
| **Beta Beta** | Spring 2025 | Purdue University | West Lafayette, Indiana | Active | |
| **Beta Gamma** | Spring 2025 | University of Minnesota - Twin Cities | Minneapolis–Saint Paul, Minnesota | Active | |
| **Beta Delta** | Spring 2025 | West Virginia University | Morgantown, West Virginia | Active | |
| **Beta Epsilon** | Spring 2026 | University of Massachusetts Amherst | Amherst, Massachusetts | Active | |
| **Beta Zeta** | Spring 2025 | University of South Carolina | Columbia, South Carolina | Active | |
| **Beta Eta** | Spring 2025 | University of California, Irvine | Irvine, California | Active | |
| **Beta Theta** | Spring 2025 | Syracuse University | Syracuse, New York | Active | |
| **Beta Iota** | Spring 2025 | University of Nebraska–Lincoln | Lincoln, Nebraska | Active | |
| **Beta Kappa** | Spring 2025 | University of Arizona | Tucson, Arizona | Active | |
| **Beta Lambda** | Spring 2025 | University of Cincinnati | Cincinnati, Ohio | Active | |
| **Beta Mu** | Spring 2025 | Ohio State University | Columbus, Ohio | Active | |
| **Beta Nu** | Spring 2025 | University of Florida | Gainesville, Florida | Active | |
| **Beta Xi** | Summer 2025 | Colorado State University | Fort Collins, Colorado | Active | |
| **Beta Omicron** | Summer 2025 | University of Chicago | Chicago, Illinois | Active | |
| **Beta Pi** | Summer 2025 | University of Central Florida | Orlando, Florida | Active | |
| **Beta Rho** | Summer 2025 | University of Washington | Seattle, Washington | Active | |
| **Beta Sigma** | Fall 2025 | University of Texas at Austin | Austin, Texas | Active | |
| **Beta Tau** | Fall 2025 | University of Utah | Salt Lake City, Utah | Active | |
| **Beta Upsilon** | Fall 2025 | University of Oregon | Eugene, Oregon | Active | |
| **Beta Phi** | Fall 2025 | Mississippi State University | Starkville, Mississippi | Active | |
| **Beta Chi** | Fall 2025 | Rutgers University | New Brunswick, New Jersey | Active | |
| **Beta Psi** | Fall 2025 | University of Wisconsin–Madison | Madison, Wisconsin | Active | |
| **Beta Omega** | Fall 2025 | University of North Carolina at Chapel Hill | Chapel Hill, North Carolina | Active | |
| **Gamma Alpha** | Fall 2025 | University of Missouri | Columbia, Missouri | Active | |
| **Gamma Beta** | Fall 2025 | Arizona State University | Tempe, Arizona | Active | |
| **Gamma Gamma** | Fall 2025 | Indiana University Bloomington | Bloomington, Indiana | Active | |
| **Gamma Delta** | Fall 2025 | University of Colorado Boulder | Boulder, Colorado | Active | |
| **Gamma Epsilon** | Fall 2025 | Duke University | Durham, North Carolina | Active | |
| **Gamma Zeta** | Fall 2025 | Stanford University | Stanford, California | Active | |
| **Gamma Eta** | Fall 2025 | Grand Valley State University | Allendale, Michigan | Active | |
| **Gamma Theta** | Fall 2025 | Virginia Tech | Blacksburg, Virginia | Active | |
| **Gamma Iota** | Spring 2026 | New York University | New York City, New York | Active | |
| **Gamma Kappa** | Spring 2026 | University of Kansas | Lawrence, Kansas | Active | |
| **Gamma Lambda** | Spring 2026 | Butler University | Indianapolis, Indiana | Active | |
| **Gamma Mu** | Spring 2026 | Santa Clara University | Santa Clara, California | Active | |
| **Gamma Nu** | Spring 2026 | University of California, Santa Barbara | Santa Barbara, California | Active | |
| **Gamma Xi** | Spring 2026 | Howard University | Washington, D.C. | Active | |
| **Gamma Omicron** | Spring 2026 | Northern Illinois University | DeKalb, Illinois | Active | |
| **Gamma Pi** | Summer 2026 | Illinios State University | Normal, Illinois | Active | |
| **Gamma Rho** | Summer 2026 | University of Idaho | Moscow, Idaho | Active | |
| **Gamma Sigma** | Summer 2026 | University of Maryland, College Park | College Park, Maryland | Active | |

== See also ==
- Professional fraternities and sororities
- Lambda Epsilon Chi (paralegal honor society)
- The Order of Barristers (law and litigation honor society)
- Order of the Coif (law honor society)
- Phi Delta Phi (law honor society)
