= Theta Chi Beta =

American honor society for religious studies

- ΘΧΒ
- Founded: 1915; 110 years ago Syracuse University
- Type: Honor
- Affiliation: Independent
- Status: Defunct
- Defunct date: After 2008
- Emphasis: Religion, Theological studies
- Scope: National
- Motto: "Progressive Revelations"
- Symbol: 6-pointed star (Shield of David), ICHTHUS (Outline of a fish)
- Chapters: 3+
- Headquarters: United States

Theta Chi Beta (ΘΧΒ) was a national honor society recognizing excellence in the study of religion. It was founded at Syracuse University.

== History ==
Theta Chi Beta was formed in 1915 at Syracuse University as an honor society for students in the fields of Religious Studies and Theology. It was the first and only society of its kind in the United States. Several chapters were formed.

The Aleph chapter remains active as the Theta Chi Beta chapter of Theta Alpha Kappa, a larger, national honor society for students in Religious studies. It was allowed to keep this name in recognition of its long history and formative role in establishing its own national society.

The last remaining independent chapter of Theta Chi Beta was the Gimel chapter, formed in 1937 at Florida Southern College, which went dormant sometime after 2008.

== Symbols ==
The fraternity's motto is "Progressive Revelations". Symbols of the fraternity include the six-pointed star called Magen David, the Shield of David, the outline of a fish symbolic of early Christians, and the Greek word and acronym, ICHTHUS, representative of "Jesous Christos Theou Uios Soter", or "Jesus Christ God's Son Savior".

Chapter officers used Hebrew designations:

- Melek (king) for president
- Sar (prince) for vice-president
- Sopher (scribe) for secretary/treasurer
- Maskir (rememberer) for recording secretary

The emblem of the society was similar to other honor society keys, with the Hebrew letter Beth (ב) as a frame, in which was held an open book, the Bible, all rendered in gold.

== Chapters ==
Following is an incomplete list of the chapters of Theta Chi Beta.

Chapter	Installation Date	College or University	Location	Status	Reference
Aleph	1915-1991	Syracuse University	Syracuse, New York	Merged, became Theta Chi Beta chapter of ΘΑΚ in 1991	
Beth	≥1934–2008+	St. Lawrence Theological School	Canton (village), New York		
Gimel	1937-20xx	Florida Southern College	Lakeland, Florida		
Daleth ?	≥1937				

== See also ==
- Theta Alpha Kappa
