= The Order of Barristers =

American law school honor society

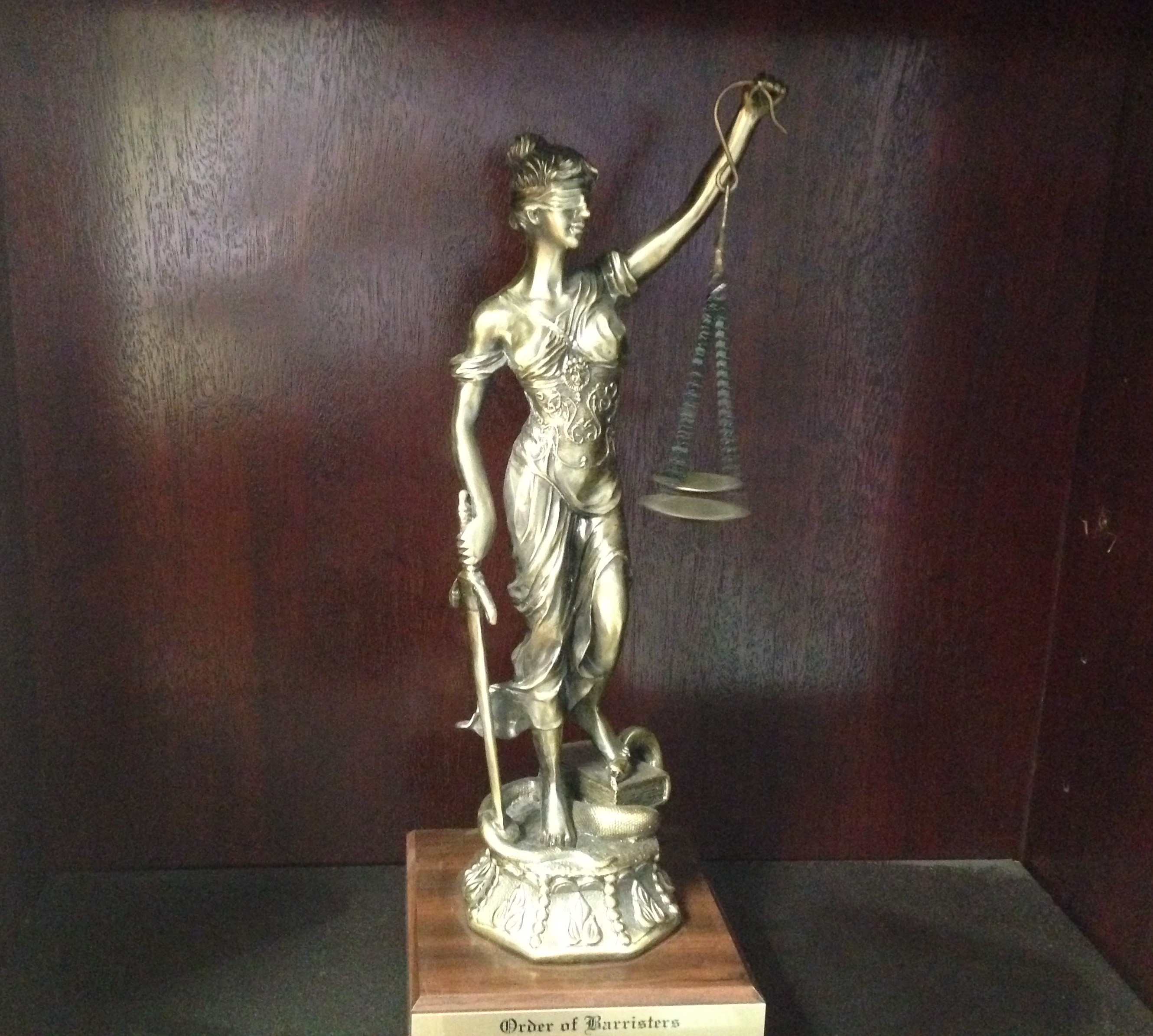
- A Barristers Statue, awarded to a new member of The Order of Barristers.
- Founded: 1965; 60 years ago University of Texas at Austin School of Law
- Type: Honor
- Affiliation: Independent
- Status: Active
- Emphasis: Law
- Scope: National
- Chapters: 116
- Headquarters: Secretary, Order of Barristers, c/o UT School of Law; 727 East Dean Keeton Street; Austin, Texas 78705; United States
- Website: law.utexas.edu/barristers/

The Order of Barristers is an honor society for United States law school graduates. Membership in The Order of Barristers is limited to graduating law students and practicing lawyers who demonstrate exceptional skill in trial advocacy, oral advocacy, and brief writing. The Order of Barristers seeks to improve these programs through interscholastic sharing of ideas, information, and resources. The Order is highly selective and provides national recognition to the top advocates at their respective law schools.

== History ==
The Order of Barristers originated in 1965 at The University of Texas at Austin School of Law. The purpose was to honor graduating 3Ls (third-year law students) who had demonstrated outstanding ability in the preparation and presentation of moot appellate argument. These students were selected by the Faculty Committee on Legal Research and Writing and the Director of the Moot Court Program.

The Order continued as a local honorary society until 1968 when the administrators of The Order initiated plans for expansion on a national basis. The law schools in the thirteen regions represented at the National Moot Court Competition were contacted, and favorable response to expansion was received. The Order was officially established as a national organization in 1970. A Constitution was adopted, and The University of Texas at Austin School of Law was elected Permanent Secretary on December 16, 1970, at the initial meeting of the Board of Governors during the final round of the National Moot Court Competition in New York City.

During the spring of 1971, a number of schools submitted applications for membership and the current roll boasts over 100 law school chapters throughout the United States. Schools having chapters in The Order include those nationally recognized for outstanding moot court programs and for successful participation in regional, national, and international interscholastic moot court competitions.

In 1973, Martindale-Hubbell, Inc. acknowledged the distinction of being selected to membership in The Order by agreeing to list it among the scholastic distinctions included in a lawyer's biographical sketch.

== Membership ==
Today, chapters of The Order of Barristers select graduating students showing particular excellence in advocacy programs. The selection method varies by chapter, but the criteria are set by the constitution of The Order:

1. Membership on interscholastic teams;
2. Participation for tryouts for interscholastic teams;
3. Participation and performance in intramural competitions;
4. Participation and performance in the administration of the school's moot court and mock trial program;
5. Participation and performance in a teaching program for brief writing and/or oral advocacy skills to other law students; and,
6. Performance record in the school's brief writing and/or oral advocacy courses.

Any selection to the membership of The Order must include at least two of these criteria.

The constitution also limits each chapter's selection of membership to The Order by number, depending on the number of students per year "who actually participate in the current year in a faculty supervised and sanctioned moot court or mock trial program." For chapters with 100 or less active student participants that year, the number of members that may be selected is limited to eight. For chapters with up to 200, the number of members that may be selected is limited to nine. For chapters with over 200 active participants, the number of members that may be selected is limited to ten.

== See also ==
- Order of the Coif (honor society, law)
- Phi Delta Phi (honor society, law; was a professional fraternity)
- Alpha Phi Sigma (honor society, criminal justice)
- Lambda Epsilon Chi (honor society, paralegal)
- Delta Theta Phi (professional fraternity, law)
- Gamma Eta Gamma (professional fraternity, law)
- Phi Alpha Delta (professional fraternity, law)
- Phi Beta Gamma (professional fraternity, law)
- Phi Delta Delta (professional fraternity, women, law)
- Sigma Delta Kappa (professional fraternity, law)
- Kappa Alpha Pi (professional) (professional fraternity, pre-law)
- Kappa Beta Pi (originally women's professional fraternity, now legal association, law)
- Nu Beta Epsilon (Jewish, originally men's professional fraternity, law, dormant?)
