= Beta Phi Gamma =

American journalism honor society

- ΒΦΓ
- Founded: December 1, 1933; 92 years ago San Bernardino, California, US
- Type: Honor
- Affiliation: Alpha Phi Gamma
- Status: Active
- Emphasis: Journalism
- Scope: National
- Colors: Black and White
- Publication: The Mouthpiece
- Headquarters: United States

Beta Phi Gamma (ΒΦΓ) was an American coeducational two-year college fraternity and honor society for journalism. It was established in 1933 as an affiliate of Alpha Phi Gamma. After going inactive nationally, it currently exists as a local group at El Camino College.

== History ==
Beta Phi Gamma was established on December 1, 1933, at an Alpha Phi Gamma national conference in San Bernardino, California. It was created as a national coeducational fraternity and honor society for journalism at two-year colleges and an affiliate of Alpha Phi Gamma. Its first president was James P. Beasom Jr.

Beta Phi Gamma's charter members were existing student organizations at Pasadena City College, San Bernardino Junior College, Phoenix Junior College, and Glendale Junior College. These chapters were installed at a joint ceremony on January 5, 1934. A fifth chapter was installed at San Benito County Junior College on March 17, 1934.

The fraternity published the first issue of its magazine, The Mouthpiece, in April 1937. In 1939, Beta Phi Gamma was recognized by the American Association of Junior Colleges.

By the end of 1940, Beta Phi Gamma had established chapters from North Carolina to California and from Arizona to Oregon. It had 26 chapters in 8 states by the end of 1957. In 1969, it established its first chapter on the East Coast at Ocean County College in New Jersey. By 1972, it had sixty chapters at junior colleges in the United States; it had grown to ninety chapters and 6,000 members by 1978.

== Symbols ==
The name Beta Phi Gamma was selected to stand for the Greek words for Trustworthy, Prudent, and Sincere. The society's insignia includes a gold key, a book, a newspaper, and an inkwell and pen. The key symbolizes sincerity to the club and mankind, while the book and newspaper "represent the responsibility and trust of mankind which is placed in the profession to inform and educate all areas of life." The inkwell and pen symbolize the tools of journalism.

Beta Phi Gamma's colors are black and white. Black symbolizes ink. Its badge bore the fraternity's name, "Beta Phi Gamma".

== Chapters ==
The following is an incomplete list of chapters of Beta Phi Gamma, with inactive chapters and institutions in italics.

Chapter	Charter date and range	Institution	Location	Status	Ref.
Alpha	January 5, 1934	Pasadena City College	Pasadena, California		
Beta	January 5, 1934	San Bernardino Junior College	San Bernardino, California		(Note: Formed from the Press Club (local).)
Gamma	January 5, 1934	Phoenix Junior College	Encanto, Phoenix, Arizona		(Note: Formed from the local Sigma Tau Epsilon honorary society.)
Delta	January 5, 1934	Glendale Junior College	Glendale, California		
Epsilon	March 17, 1934	San Benito County Junior College	Gilroy, California		
	1934	Ouachita Parish Junior College	Monroe, Louisiana		
Eta	<= 1935	Taft Junior College	Taft, California		
	<= 1935	Santa Rosa Junior College	Santa Rosa, California		
Iota	<= 1941	Textile Industrial Institute	Saxon, South Carolina		
Lambda	1934	Visalia Junior College	Visalia, California		
Mu	<= 1935	Colorado Women's College	Denver, Colorado		
Nu	February 27, 1934	Beckley College	Beckley, West Virginia		
Xi	March 1935	St. Helens Hall	Portland, Oregon		(Note: Chapter formed from the Press Club (local).)
Omicron	May 25, 1936– 19xx ?; 1965	Coalinga College	Coalinga, California		
	1935	Northeast Center of Louisiana State University	Monroe, Louisiana		
	<= 1937	Los Angeles Junior College	Los Angeles, California		
Pi	March 1937	Long Beach City College	Long Beach, California		
Rho	January 15, 1940	Louisburg College	Louisburg, North Carolina		
Sigma	May 23, 1938	Santa Ana Junior College	Santa Ana, California		
Tau	<= 1939	Armstrong College	Berkeley, California		
	February 1940	Hutchinson Junior College	Hutchinson, Kansas		
	c. 1940–1943	Spokane Junior College	Spokane, Washington		(Note: The college closed in 1942.)
Upsilon	1941	Amarillo College	Amarillo, Texas		
Chi	before 1948	Compton Junior College	Compton, California		(Note: At 1947 convention)
Psi	May 1943	Stephens College	Columbia, Missouri		(Note: Chapter formed from the Kappa Phi Delta local honorary journalism sorority.)
	1944	Fairleigh Dickinson Junior College	Madison, New Jersey		
	before 1948	Bakersfield Junior College	Bakersfield, California		
Alpha Beta	December 13, 1947	John Muir Junior College	Pasadena, California		
Alpha Gamma	December 13, 1947	East Los Angeles Community College	Monterey Park, California		
Alpha Epsilon	May 1950	San Antonio College	San Antonio, Texas		
Alpha Eta		El Camino College	Torrance, California	Active	
Alpha Theta	before December 1957	Los Angeles Valley College	Van Nuys, Los Angeles, California		
Alpha Kappa	<= 1957–19xx ?, 1970	Santa Monica City College	Santa Monica, California		
	February 1964	Cerritos Junior College	Norwalk, California		
Alpha Tau	March 1956	Los Angeles Harbor College	Wilmington, Los Angeles, California		
Alpha Chi	June 1953	Modesto Junior College	Modesto, California		
	November 1958	Pierce Junior College	Woodland Hills, Los Angeles, California		
	<= 1962	Riverside City College	Riverside, California		
Beta Lambda	March 1962	Moline Community College	Moline, Illinois		
Beta Mu	c. May 1962	Navarro Junior College	Corsicana, Texas		
Beta Xi	January 1963	Sacred Heart College	Cullman, Alabama		
	<= December 1963	Point Park Junior College	Pittsburgh, Pennsylvania		
	<= October 1964	Pensacola Junior College	Pensacola, Florida		
	<= November 1964	Rio Hondo College	Whittier, California		
	1964	Northwood Institute	Midland, Michigan		(Note: Chapter formed from Rho Omicron (local).)
	May 1965	Daytona Beach Junior College	Daytona Beach, Florida		
	February 1966	Dixie Junior College	St. George, Utah		
Beta Upsilon	<=1966	Odessa College	Odessa, Texas		
Beta Chi	1965–19xx ?; April 1975	Lee College	Baytown, Texas		
Theta Delta	<=1957	Valley Junior College	Van Nuys, Los Angeles, California		
Gamma Gamma	May 1965	Daytona Beach Junior College	Daytona Beach, Florida		
Gamm Zeta	<=1967	Southwestern College	Chula Vista, California		
Gamma Theta	1966	Becker Junior College	Worcester, Massachusetts		
	1967	Cochise College	Cochise County, Arizona		
	<= 1967	Anderson College	Anderson, South Carolina		
	<= 1967	Fox Valley Technical College	Grand Chute, Wisconsin		
	<= 1967	Chicago City Colleges, Crane Campus	Chicago, Illinois		
Gamma Phi	<= 1967	Mount St. Clare College	Clinton County, Iowa		
Delta Gamma		Milwaukee Area Technical College	Milwaukee, Wisconsin		
Delta Zeta	January 1969	Ocean County College	Ocean County, New Jersey		
Delta Eta	March 1969	Vincennes University	Vincennes, Indiana		
	<= March 1969	Citrus College			
	April 1969	College of the Desert	Palm Desert, California		
	<= 1969	Golden West College	Huntington Beach, California		
Lambda Delta	1970	Gloucester County College	Sewell, New Jersey		
Delta Nu	Before February 1971	Barton County Community College	Great Bend, Kansas		
Delta Pi	April 1971	Columbia College	Columbia, Missouri		
Delta Upsilon	March 1972	Hillsborough Community College	Hillsborough County, Florida		
	<= 1972	Fullerton College	Fullerton, California		
	<= 1973	Miami-Dade Community College North	Miami, Florida		
	March 23, 1973	Brownsville Junior College	Brownsville, Texas		
Delta Psi	<= 1974	Fort Scott Community College	Fort Scott, Kansas		
	November 1978	Lake Michigan College	Berrien County, Michigan		

== Membership ==
For membership, students were required to be a staff member of a college publication, had to demonstrate outstanding work in the field of journalism, scholastic standing in the upper one-third of the college, and a B average in journalism classes and at least a C average overall. Members who later attended an institution with an Alpha Phi Gamma chapter were automatically transferred into that group.

== Conventions ==
- 1934 – San Bernardino and Redlands, California (Note: Jointly held with Alpha Phi Gamma)
- 1935 – Fresno, California
- 1936 – Los Angeles, California
- 1937 – San Francisco, California
- 1938 – Santa Barbara, California
- 1939 – Long Beach City College
- 1940 – Phoenix Junior College
- 1941 – Visalia Junior College
- 1946 – San Bernadion, California
- 1947 – Pasadena City College
- 1948 – University of the Redlands
- 1950 – Glendale City College
- 1955 – East Los Angeles Junior College
- 1958 – Long Beach City College
- 1959 – El Camino College
- 1964 – Sportsman Lodge, Studio City, Los Angeles, California (hosted by Valley College)
- 1965 – Disneyland Hotel
- 1966 – Van Nuys College
- 1967 – Santa Barbara, California
- 1968 - San Bernardino, California
- 1969 – University of California, Irvine and Newport Beach, California
- 1970 – Newport Beach, California
- 1971 – Burbank, California
- 1972 – Ventura College
- 1973 – San Jacinto College (Note: Jointly held with the Journalism Association of Community Colleges.)
- 1976 – La Verne College

== Notable members ==
- Brad Pye Jr. (Alpha Gamma), sports journalist and broadcaster
