= Sigma Alpha Lambda =

American collegiate honor society

- ΣΑΛ
- Founded: 2001; 25 years ago University of Arizona
- Type: Honor
- Affiliation: Independent
- Status: Active
- Emphasis: All-discipline
- Scope: National
- Colors: Navy, Black, and Gold
- Chapters: 65+
- Members: 145,000 active
- Headquarters: 67 South Bedford Street, Suite 400W; Burlington, Massachusetts 34209; United States
- Website: sigmaalphalambda.org

Sigma Alpha Lambda (ΣΑΛ) is an American college leadership and honor society. It was founded in 2001 at the University of Arizona in Tucson, Arizona. It has chartered around seventy chapters.

== History ==
Sigma Alpha Lambda was founded in 2001 at the University of Arizona in Tucson, Arizona. It is a leadership and honor society that seeks to recognize academic achievement, develop its member's leadership skills, and encourage members to participate in service activities.

It was recognized as a nonprofit corporation in 2004. As of 2024, the honor society has more than 65 chapters and 145,000 initiates. Its headquarters are in Burlington, Massachusetts.

== Symbols ==
The society's colors are navy, black, and gold. Graduating members may wear honor cords consisting of the three Sigma Alpha Lambda colors, a blue and gold tassel, or a navy blue stole.

== Membership ==
Membership in Sigma Alpha Lambda by invitation. It is open to all undergraduate students who meet the national requirements of sophomore classification or higher with a minimum cumulative GPA of 3.0 or higher on a 4.0 scale. Membership is also open to graduate students who meet the GPA requirement for undergraduates.

== Activities ==
Sigma Alpha Lambda offers its members annual scholarships and awards ranging from $100 up to $5,000. Each year, the society's chapters participate in two national initiatives that are coordinated by the national office. In the fall, members volunteer through SAL's Food Fight against Hunger. Each spring, chapters participate in their local Relay for Life and collect donations on behalf of their team. Sigma Alpha Lambda is a National Youth Affiliate of the American Cancer Society's Relay for Life.

== Chapters ==
Sigma Alpha Lambda has chapters at universities in the United States.

| Charter date | Institution | Location | Status | Reference |
|---|---|---|---|---|
| | Appalachian State University | Boone, North Carolina | Active | |
| | Arizona State University | Tempe, Arizona | Active | |
| | Arkansas State University | Jonesboro, Arkansas | Active | |
| | Binghamton University | Vestal, New York | Active | |
| | Boston University | Boston, Massachusetts | Active | |
| | California State University, Fresno | Fresno, California | Active | |
| | California State University, Fullerton | Fullerton, California | Inactive | |
| | California State University, Long Beach | Long Beach, California | Inactive | |
| | Castleton University | Castleton, Vermont | Active | |
| | Central Michigan University | Mount Pleasant, Michigan | Inactive | |
| | Clemson University | Clemson, South Carolina | Active | |
| | Colorado State University | Fort Collins, Colorado | Active | |
| | Dallas College El Centro Campus | Dallas, Texas | Active | |
| | East Carolina University | Greenville, North Carolina | Active | |
| | East Tennessee State University | Johnson City, Tennessee | Active | |
| | Eastern Michigan University | Ypsilanti, Michigan | Active | |
| | Eastern Washington University | Cheney, Washington | Active | |
| | Emporia State University | Emporia, Kansas | Active | |
| | Florida International University | University Park, Florida | Active | |
| | Florida State University | Tallahassee, Florida | Inactive | |
| | George Washington University | Washington, D.C. | Inactive | |
| | Georgia Southern University | Statesboro, Georgia | Inactive | |
| | Georgia Tech | Atlanta, Georgia | Inactive | |
| | Grambling State University | Grambling, Louisiana | Inactive | |
| | Grand Valley State University | Allendale, Michigan | Active | |
| | Illinois State University | Normal, Illinois | Active | |
| | Indiana State University | Terre Haute, Indiana | Active | |
| | Indiana University Bloomington | Bloomington, Indiana | Inactive | |
| | Indiana University of Pennsylvania | Indiana, Pennsylvania | Active | |
| | Iowa State University | Ames, Iowa | Inactive | |
| | James Madison University | Harrisonburg, Virginia | Active | |
| | Kansas State University | Manhattan, Kansas | Active | |
| | Kent State University | Kent, Ohio | Inactive | |
| | Michigan State University | East Lansing, Michigan | Inactive | |
| | Middle Tennessee State University | Murfreesboro, Tennessee | Inactive | |
| | Mississippi State University | Mississippi State, Mississippi | Active | |
| | Missouri State University | Springfield, Missouri | Inactive | |
| | Montclair State University | Montclair, New Jersey | Active | |
| | Murray State University | Murray, Kentucky | Active | |
| | New Mexico State University | Las Cruces, New Mexico | Active | |
| | North Carolina State University | Raleigh, North Carolina | Active | |
| | North Dakota State University | Fargo, North Dakota | Inactive | |
| | Northeastern University | Boston, Massachusetts | Inactive | |
| | Northern Arizona University | Flagstaff, Arizona | Active | |
| | Oakland University | Auburn Hills and Rochester Hills, Michigan | Inactive | |
| | Ohio State University | Columbus, Ohio | Inactive | |
| | Ohio University | Athens, Ohio | Inactive | |
| | Oklahoma State University | Stillwater, Oklahoma | Active | |
| | Old Dominion University | Norfolk, Virginia | Active | |
| | Purdue University | West Lafayette, Indiana | Active | |
| | Rowan University | Glassboro, New Jersey | Active | |
| | San Diego State University | San Diego, California | Active | |
| | San Jose State University | San Jose, California | Inactive | |
| | Sonoma State University | Rohnert Park, California | Inactive | |
| | Southeastern Louisiana University | Hammond, Louisiana | Inactive | |
| | Southern Illinois University Carbondale | Carbondale, Illinois | Inactive | |
| | Texas A&M University | College Station, Texas | Active | |
| | Texas State University | San Marcos, Texas | Active | |
| | Texas Tech University | Lubbock, Texas | Active | |
| | Texas Woman's University | Denton, Texas | Active | |
| | University of Akron | Akron, Ohio | Inactive | |
| | University of Alabama | Tuscaloosa, Alabama | Active | |
| | University of Alabama at Birmingham | Birmingham, Alabama | Active | |
| 2001 | University of Arizona | Tucson, Arizona | Active | |
| | University of Arkansas at Little Rock | Little Rock, Arkansas | Inactive | |
| | University of California, Berkeley | Berkeley, California | Inactive | |
| | University of California, Davis | Davis, California | Inactive | |
| | University of California, Los Angeles | Los Angeles, California | Inactive | |
| | University of California, Riverside | Riverside, California | Inactive | |
| | University of California, Santa Barbara | Santa Barbara, California | Inactive | |
| | University of Central Arkansas | Conway, Arkansas | Active | |
| | University of Central Missouri | Warrensburg, Missouri | Inactive | |
| | University of Central Oklahoma | Edmond, Oklahoma | Active | |
| | University of Connecticut | Storrs, Connecticut | Inactive | |
| | University of Colorado Denver | Denver, Colorado | Active | |
| | University of Colorado Colorado Springs | Colorado Springs, Colorado | Inactive | |
| | University of Georgia | Athens, Georgia | Active | |
| | University of Illinois Urbana-Champaign | Urbana and Champaign, Illinois | Active | |
| | University of Iowa | Iowa City, Iowa | Active | |
| | University of Kansas | Lawrence, Kansas | Inactive | |
| | University of Kentucky | Lexington, Kentucky | Inactive | |
| | University of Louisiana at Lafayette | Lafayette, Louisiana | Active | |
| | University of Louisville | Louisville, Kentucky | Active | |
| | University of Maine | Orono, Maine | Active | |
| | University of Maryland, Baltimore County | Catonsville, Maryland | Active | |
| | University of Maryland, College Park | College Park, Maryland | Active | |
| | University of Memphis | Memphis, Tennessee | Active | |
| | University of Michigan | Ann Arbor, Michigan | Inactive | |
| | University of Minnesota | Minneapolis and Saint Paul, Minnesota | Inactive | |
| | University of Mississippi | Oxford, Mississippi | Active | |
| | University of Montevallo | Montevallo, Alabama | Inactive | |
| | University of Nebraska–Lincoln | Lincoln, Nebraska | Active | |
| | University of North Carolina at Chapel Hill | Chapel Hill, North Carolina | Active | |
| | University of North Carolina at Charlotte | Charlotte, North Carolina | Active | |
| | University of North Carolina at Greensboro | Greensboro, North Carolina | Active | |
| | University of North Carolina Wilmington | Wilmington, North Carolina | Active | |
| | University of North Florida | Jacksonville, Florida | Inactive | |
| | University of North Texas | Denton, Texas | Active | |
| | University of Northern Colorado | Greeley, Colorado | Inactive | |
| | University of Oklahoma | Norman, Oklahoma | Active | |
| | University of Pittsburgh | Pittsburgh, Pennsylvania | Active | |
| | University of South Carolina | Columbia, South Carolina | Active | |
| | University of South Florida | Tampa, Florida | Active | |
| | University of Southern California | Los Angeles, California | Inactive | |
| | University of Southern Mississippi | Hattiesburg, Mississippi | Active | |
| | University of Tennessee | Knoxville, Tennessee | Active | |
| | University of Texas at Arlington | Arlington, Texas | Active | |
| | University of Texas at Austin | Austin, Texas | Inactive | |
| | University of Texas at El Paso | El Paso, Texas | Inactive | |
| | University of Texas at San Antonio | San Antonio, Texas | Inactive | |
| | University of Virginia | Charlottesville, Virginia | Active | |
| | University of Washington | Seattle, Washington | Inactive | |
| | University of Wisconsin–Madison | Madison, Wisconsin | Inactive | |
| | University of Wisconsin–Whitewater | Whitewater, Wisconsin | Active | |
| | Valdosta State University | Valdosta, Georgia | Active | |
| | Virginia Commonwealth University | Richmond, Virginia | Active | |
| | Virginia Tech | Blacksburg, Virginia | Active | |
| | West Virginia University | Morgantown, West Virginia | Active | |
| | Western Illinois University | Macomb, Illinois | inactive | |
| | Western Michigan University | Kalamazoo, Michigan | Active | |
| | Wichita State University | Wichita, Kansas | Inactive | |
| | Youngstown State University | Youngstown, Ohio | Active | |

== See also ==
- Honor cords
