= Pi Epsilon =

American environmental sciences honor society

- ΠΕ
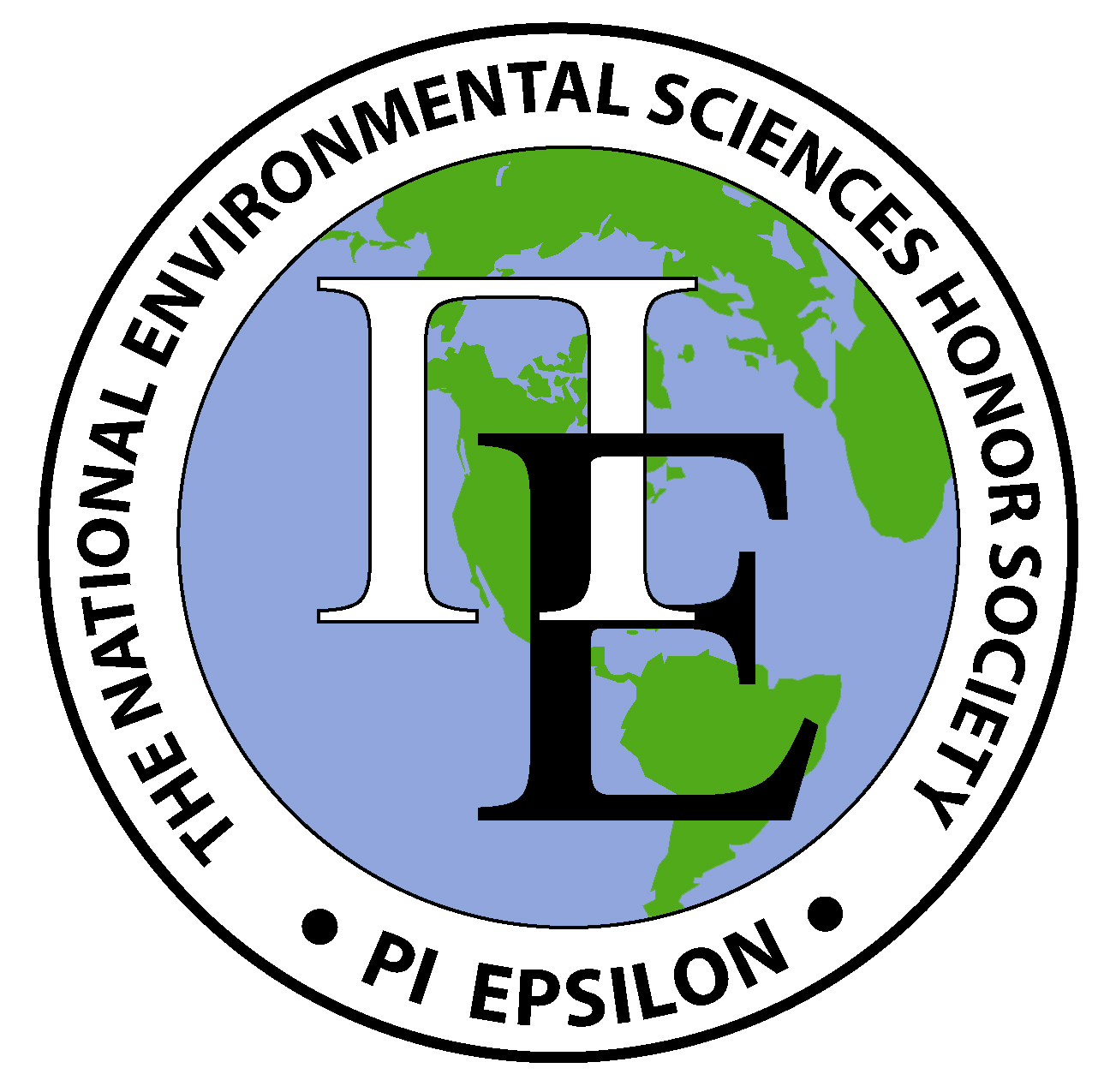
- Founded: October 2003; 22 years ago Wright State University
- Type: Honor
- Affiliation: Independent
- Status: Active
- Emphasis: Environmental sciences
- Scope: National
- Motto: Dum Spiro Spero "Where there is life, there is hope."
- Colors: Blue and Green
- Chapters: 8
- Headquarters: c/o Kim Napier; 114 Biological Sciences; Wright State University; 3640 Colonel Glenn Hwy. Dayton, Ohio 45435; United States
- Website: science-math.wright.edu/environmental-sciences-phd-program/pi-epsilon

Pi Epsilon (ΠΕ) is an American environmental sciences honor society for graduate, undergraduates, and professionals and scientists working in the field. It was established in 2003 at Wright State University in Fairbon, Ohio.

== History ==
Pi Epsilon was founded at Wright State University in Fairbon, Ohio in October 2003. Its founders were doctoral students in the Environmental Sciences Program. The society was formed to is to promote the study of environmental sciences by recognizing scholarly and professional activity. It also promotes interdisciplinary studies and interactions between industry and academia.

A second chapter was established at University of Virginia. As of 2025, the society has fifteen chapters in the United States. It is headquartered at Wright State University.

== Symbols ==
The society's motto is Dum Spiro Spero or "Where there is life, there is hope". Its colors are blue and green.

== Membership requirements ==
Lifetime membership is open to undergraduate in the environmental and natural sciences who have completed thirty hours with a GPA of at least 3.30, including three environmental science classes. Graduate students are eligible if they have complete six hours with a GPA of at least 3.30.

== Chapters ==
Following are the known chapters of Pi Epsilon.

Chapter	Charter date and range	Institution	Location	Status	Ref.
Alpha	October 2003	Wright State University	Fairbon, Ohio	Active	
Beta		University of Virginia	Charlottesville, Virginia	Active	
		Adelphi University	Garden City, New York	Active	
		Baylor University	Waco, Texas	Active	
	2019	California State Polytechnic University, Humboldt	Arcata, California	Active	
	2022	Emory University	Atlanta, Georgia	Active	
		Lemoyne College	DeWitt, New York	Active	
		State University of New York at Oneonta	Oneonta, New York	Active	
