= Ku Klux Klan (honor society) =

American interfraternity honor society

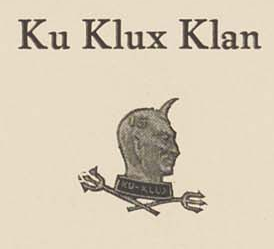
- Founded: 1906; 120 years ago University of Illinois
- Type: Honor
- Affiliation: Independent
- Status: Defunct
- Defunct date: 1939
- Emphasis: Junior interfraternity
- Scope: Regional
- Colors: Black
- Chapters: 13 ?
- Other names: Ku Klux; Tu–Mas
- Headquarters: Urbana, Illinois; United States

Ku Klux Klan, also known as Ku Klux and later, Tu–Mas, was an American interfraternity honor society formed at the University of Illinois in 1906. After its name change the group grew to thirteen chapters. It went defunct in 1939. It was not affiliated with the national Ku Klux Klan organization.

== History ==
The Ku Klux Klan student organization formed in 1906 or 1908 at the University of Illinois. It was referred to as "Ku Klux" in the 1909 yearbook. It was officially recognized by the university in 1915. In the 1916 yearbook, it was called Ku Klux Klan and was described as an honor fraternity.

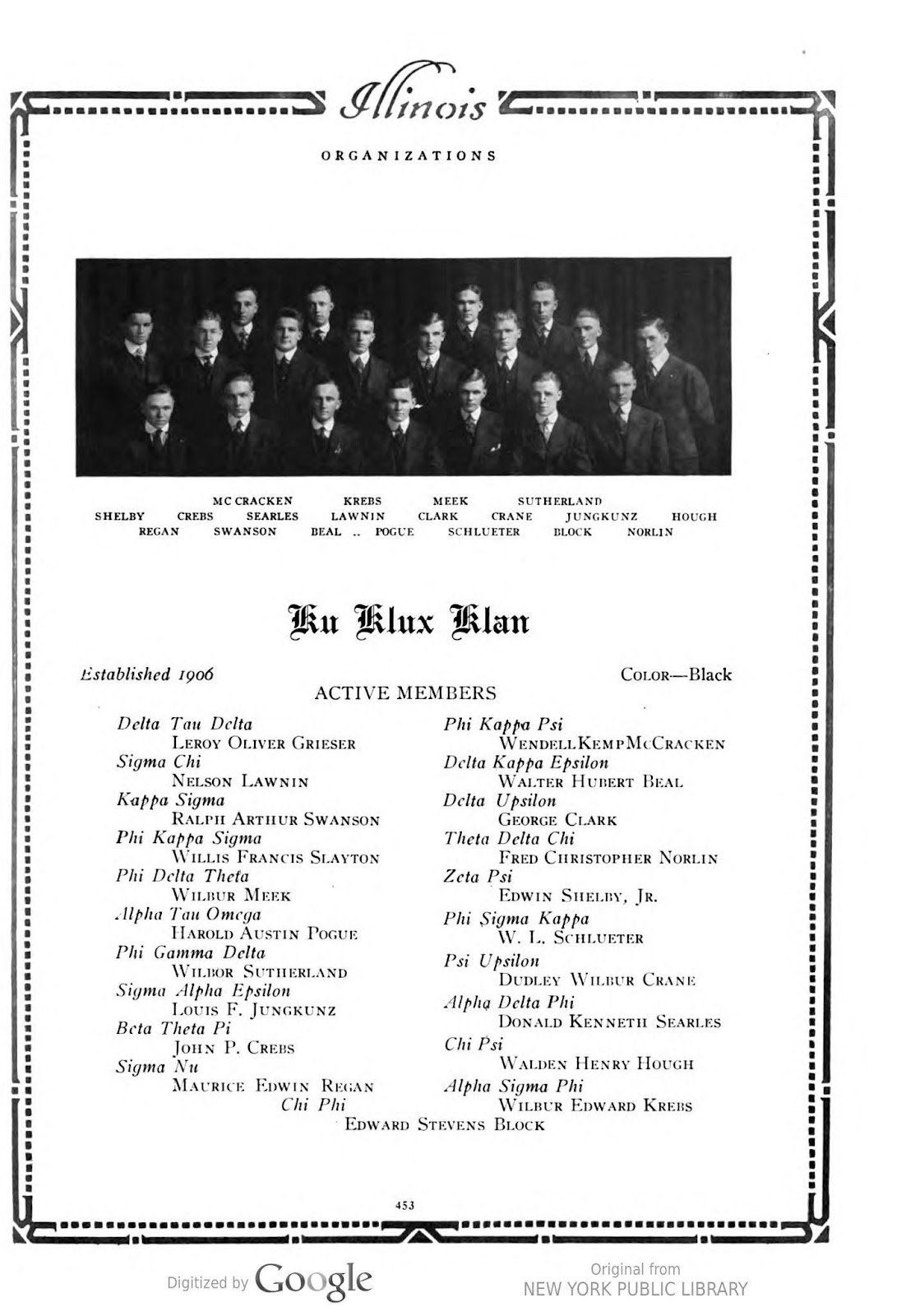
1916 yearbook, University of Illinois

By 1918, the Ku Klux Klan student organization was considered a "junior interfraternity society". Its members came from the various campus fraternities. They were known to participate in events that used old Ku Klux Klan symbolism, suggesting a casual acceptance of what is now considered racist imagery. The original Klan, that is, the racist political group, had been disbanded in 1872, fifty years prior to the lived experience of the new generation of students who founded the student organization. They did not know that in another decade the Klan would be reestablished as a political entity. The Daily Illini noted:

The campus group is in no way connected with the older group that is now spreading so rapidly throughout the country; its aims and its ideals are of a different nature, its personnel different; the campus Ku Klux Klan is purely a social organization.

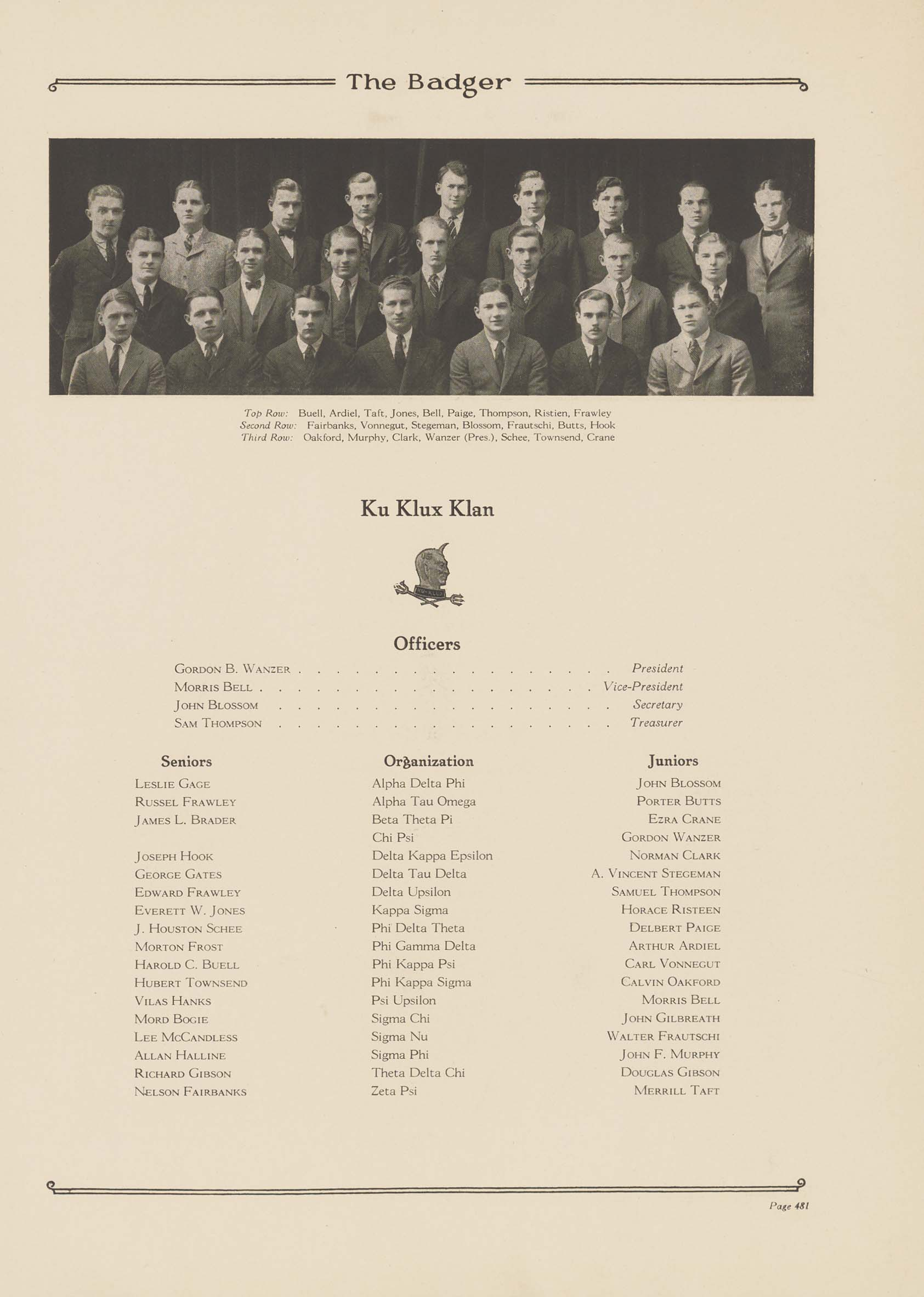
The Badger yearbook 1924, University of Wisconsin–Madison

Gordon B. Bilderback, A. Ingwersen, Robert Lorenz, C. E. Lovejoy, and Robert Tutwiler of the Illinois chapter established a second chapter of the Ku Klux Klan interfraternity honor society at the University of Wisconsin–Madison in May 1919. The sponsoring fraternity for the honor society's Wisconsin chapter was Phi Gamma Delta. Its members included some of the university's most prominent student leaders and, later, alumni. At Wisconsin, a local sophomore men's organization, the Cardinal Club, functioned as a "sister-ship" to the society. As with the Illinois chapter there was no evidence of a connection to the national Ku Klux Klan.

With the second rise of the national Ku Klux Klan political group into the early 1920s, the student organization began to receive criticism for its name. On January 8, 1923, the Illinois chapter wore red-crossed robes at one of its social gatherings, closely emulating the Ku Klux Klan. The Daily Illini urged the group to change its name the next day. The university administration's response was to prohibit the fraternity from holding dances until it was "properly organized".

In 1922, the reformed, or Second Ku Klux Klan, a separate political group, began actively recruiting on the University of Wisconsin campus. In 1923 the Second Ku Klux Klan also established its own affiliated local fraternity called Kappa Beta Lambda (KBL, for "Klansmen Be Loyal") at the university. No other chapters of KBL are known to have existed. In April 1923, spurred by the name confusion and wishing to distance itself from the racist focus or brand inherent in its name, the student honor society held a meeting of all five chapters in Chicago where it changed its name to Tu–Mas. Contemporaneous sources note the society changed its name because of confusion between it and the original Ku Klux Klan. The honor society further wanted to disassociate with the Second Ku Klux Klan.

The taint of an ill-named beginning and a drifting purpose led to its demise: By 1929, The Daily Illinis said Tu–Mas was "long regarded as little more than a bridge player's organization". Tu–Mas called itself a junior-senior interfraternity social organization by 1934. During the 1930s, the Tu-Mas chapter at Wisconsin focused heavily on campus politics, leading to its downfall. Tu-Mas went dormant in 1939.

== Symbols ==
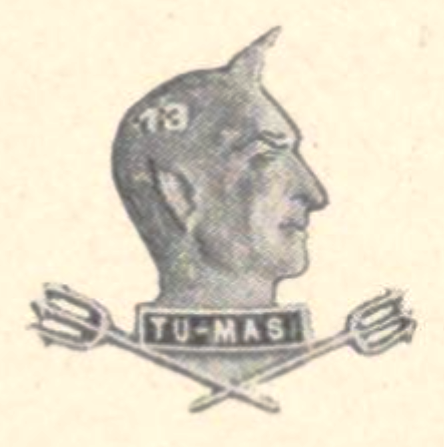
Tu-Mas honor society badge

Factors leading to the choice of the name Ku Klux Klan are unknown. One modern writer speculated that the students might have been influenced by the romanticized portrayal of the Ku Klux Klan in the novels of Thomas Dixon. Another notes the Ku Klux Klan was mostly inactive at the time that the student organization formed, having disbanded in the 1870s, and the students may have naively and stupidly appropriated the name as something from the past. At the time, many student groups in the United States were selecting "sinister" names.

The University of Illinois 1916 yearbook notes the fraternity's color was black. Its members were known to wear black hoods and robes.

The Ku Klux Klan badge was a devil's head bearing the number 13 at the top and words ''Ku–Klux" at its base, with crossed pitchforks below. The badge for Tu–Mas was the same, with the name "Tu–Mas" replacing "Ku-Klux". The group also had a watch fob or key that featured the devil logo. The name Tu–Mas was said to be of Indian origin.

At the University of Wisconsin, Tu–Mas was known for its initiations where its new members wore tailcoats and derby hats, while pushing baby carriages.

== Activities ==
At the University of Illinois, Tu–Mas held an annual masked dance at various fraternity houses. The tradition included Tu–Mas members wearing masks and numbered robes, with the guests not knowing who their date was until the end of the dance.

In April 1926, the Ilini chapter organized its first annual interfraternity bridge tournament, with a rotating silver-loving cup trophy. In 1930, the tournament was co-sponsored by Shi–Ai, the sorority counterpart of Tu–Mas. In March 1932, Tu–Mas partnered with Shi–Ai and the Alumni Association to sponsor an All-University Duplicate Bridge Tournament as a fundraiser for the Emergency Student Loan Fund.

The society awarded the annual Tu–Mas Cup to the junior who had the best improvement in academics from the second semester of their sophomore year. The competition was open to all juniors, and students were allowed to nominate themselves for the cup. In May 1929, Tu–Mas created a system to rank the campus activities of male students, enabling it to coordinate a student and fraternity activity competition. Winners were selected based on scholarship and activities and received a trophy with a bronze statuette.

== Membership ==
Members of the honor society were nominated by its partner fraternities on campus, with each group nominating one member each year. These were chapters of all national fraternities on campus. In 1925, there were 21 participating fraternities at the University of Illinois were Alpha Delta Phi, Alpha Sigma Phi, Alpha Tau Omega, Beta Theta Pi, Chi Phi, Chi Psi, Delta Kappa Epsilon, Delta Tau Delta, Delta Upsilon, Kappa Sigma, Phi Delta Kappa, Phi Gamma Delta, Phi Kappa Psi, Phi Kappa Sigma, Phi Sigma Kappa, Psi Upsilon, Sigma Alpha Epsilon, Sigma Chi, Sigma Nu, Theta Delta Chi, and Zeta Psi. Phi Gamma Delta withdrew its members in March 1935 because "the fraternity gain[ed] no material benefit from membership." This was the only known instance of one of Illinois' fraternities withdrawing from the honor society.

In addition to membership in a Greek letter organization, the honor society's members appear to have been active on campus, serving on the athletic board, the homecoming committee, the prom committee, the student court, the student senate, the student union board, the yearbook, and the YMCA cabinet.

== Governance ==
The society was overseen by a national board which was elected at an annual meeting. Officers included the president, vice president, secretary, treasurer, and sergeant of arms.

== Chapters ==
The society had thirteen chapters. However, only two remained active by 1933. Following is a list of known chapters. A group at Alfred University known as the Ku Klux Klan from 1901 to 1920 appears to have been unrelated.

Chapter	Charter date	Institution	Location	Status	Ref.
Illini	1906	University of Illinois	Urbana, Illinois	Inactive	
	May 1919	University of Wisconsin–Madison	Madison, Wisconsin	Inactive	

== Notable members ==
- Fredric March (Wisconsin), actor

== Systemic racism and campus legacy ==
The creation of this honor society is a visible reminder of an earlier era where racial and religious bigotry was at times common and unexamined. Numerous references indicate that the adoption of the Klan name and imagery by these students was made through ill-considered, sophomoric fascination with baleful imagery such as the devil head, spooky robes and hoods, and an evocative name from their grandfathers' days, rather than a purposeful engagement into sub rosa (or even semi-public) activism intended to promote nativist or racist aims. There is no indication that this particular society engaged in Klan-type activism. Clearly, with the actual Klan building its influence through the mid-1920s, (Note: Reaching the height of its restored influence perhaps in 1924's "Klanbake".) the Ku Klux Klan Honor Society soon re-cast itself with a new name, with even its young collegians realizing the negative baggage that came with their adoption of the Klan for their iconography, and even without a legal connection to the political group. But the group's very presence for a few short years before changing its name to Tu-Mas sparked decades of reproach. A notable member, Fredric March worked tirelessly for years as a strident anti-racist and activist for inclusion and fairness, yet just because his name was tapped for membership into the honor group while an upperclassman, new legions of activists have demanded his name be struck from theaters that had been named in his honor.

Fairly stated, the name "Ku Klux Klan" is incendiary, far more so today than during its more active years as a quasi-political entity. Among campus Greek-named societies, the few holdout groups that had retained echoes of prior race, gender, or religious bars are suspect; most have quietly cleaned up their bylaws, long after their operational practices had been liberalized.

In recent years, universities have begun to reckon with aspects of historical racism, inconvenient facts that, devoid of context and perspective would declare that the entire South was seething non-stop in murderous racial animus, bringing along with it a reactionary East. Study groups and reports, such as those commissioned by the University of Wisconsin-Madison following violence at the Unite the Right rally in Charlottesville in 2017, have aimed to understand and address the legacy of racist organizations. These efforts are part of a broader institutional commitment to confronting past injustices and working towards inclusivity.
