= Theta Chi Delta =

American chemistry honor fraternity

- ΘΧΔ
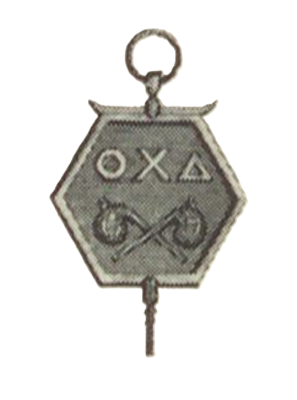
- Founded: October 1920; 106 years ago Carroll College
- Type: Honor
- Affiliation: Independent
- Status: Defunct
- Emphasis: Chemistry
- Scope: National
- Colors: Gold, Purple, and Black
- Publication: The Crucible
- Chapters: 14
- Headquarters: United States

Theta Chi Delta (ΘΧΔ) was an American honor fraternity in the field of chemistry. It was established in 1920 at Carroll College in Waukesha, Wisconsin. It ceased operations as a national organization in 1954, with some chapters continuing as a local honor society. The former chapter at Carthage College remains active.

== History ==
Theta Chi Delta chemistry honor fraternity was founded at Carroll College in Waukesha, Wisconsin in October 1920 from the college's chemistry club. Its founders were A. F. Gillman Jr. and Percy M. Paddock. Its purpose was to encourage scholarship in chemistry and to promote continued study in the field. Clyde Hertz was Theta Chi Delta's first president.

Carroll College was designated the Alpha chapter of the new national honor fraternity and was authorized to established other chapters in the United States. Geauque was elected the first national president. A second chapter was formed on February 2, 1921 at Lombard College in Galesburg, Illinois. It was founded by three professions and twelve students under the leadership of Harry A. Geauque, head of Lombard's chemistry department. Geauque designed the fraternity's emblem and helped create its constitution and ritual. As a result, the fraternity considered Geauque to be its main founder.

Additional chapters were established at the College of Wooster and the University of Louisville in 1924. A chapter was established at Bethany College in Lindsborg, Kansas on January 12, 1925. The fraternity was governed by a grand council or Master Alchemists, which met at biennial national conventions. Its grand officers included the president, vice president, secretary, treasurer, and historian. By April 1925, the Carroll College chapter was inactive, leaving Lombard as the fraternity's oldest chapter.

The first national convention was held in St. Louis, Missouri, on April 3 and 4, 1925, with representatives from six chapters attending. The 1926 convention was held at the campus of the University of Louisville on April 2 and 3. At that meeting, the fraternity installed a chapter at the College of William & Mary. The 1928 convention was held at Wittenburg College on April 6 and 7, and was attended by representatives of eleven chapters.

Theta Chi Delta had initiated 507 members and chartered twelve chapters by 1930, with eleven chapters being active. Chapter meetings were educational. Chapters were expected to show an active interest in the work in their campus's chemistry department. Chapter activities included hosting exhibitions and essay contests, awarding prizes, and publishing professional papers. In April 1932, the fraternity had 771 active and alumni members in thirteen chapters.

Over time, membership in the fraternity declined due to competition from organizations such as the American Chemical Society. Theta Chi Delta held a meeting at Wittenberg College on May 1, 1953, where it was decided to dissolve the fraternity in one year as a national organization, unless the situation could be reversed. After Theta Chi Delta ceased as a national organization in 1954, some chapters withdrew and continued as local organizations. The chapter at Bethany College operated as a local honorary society for several years. The former chapter at Carthage College was still active in 2026 as the Theta Chi Delta/Chemistry Club.

== Symbols ==
Theta Chi Delta's badge was a hexagonal-shaped gold key, bearing the Greek letters "ΘΧΔ" over crossed retorts on the front and balances, the member's name, and chapter on the reverse. The society's colors were gold, purple, and black. Its publication was The Crucible, first published in February 1921 by the Alpha chapter.

== Membership ==
Membership in Theta Chi Delta was a reward for high scholarship and attainment in chemistry. The fraternity admitted members who were "pursuing credible work in advanced chemistry". Students were required to be chemistry majors with at least a 3.0 GPA. Alumni and faculty who worked in the field of chemistry were also eligible for membership. The fraternity was coeducational.

== Chapters ==
Following are the chapters of Theta Chi Delta, with inactive chapters and institutions indicated in italics.

Chapter	Original chapter name	Charter date and range	Institution	Location	Status	Ref.
	Alpha	October 1920 – before April 1925	Carroll College	Waukesha, Wisconsin	Inactive	(Note: Chapter formed from the Carroll College Chemistry Club.)
Alpha Alpha	Beta (First)	February 2, 1921 – c. 1930	Lombard College	Galesburg, Illinois	Inactive	(Note: Presumably, the chapter was renamed after the original Alpha chapter went inactive. This appears to have been before January 1925, when the Beta name was reassigned to the newly formed Bethany College chapters.) (Note: Chapter went inactive when the college closed in 1930.)
Alpha Beta	Gamma	December 1924	College of Wooster	Wooster, Ohio	Inactive	
Alpha Gamma	Delta	January 1925	University of Louisville	Louisville, Kentucky	Inactive	
Alpha Delta	Beta (Second)	January 12, 1925	Bethany College	Lindsborg, Kansas	Withdrew (local)	(Note: At the time of national dissolution, this chapter withdrew and became a local organization that operated for several years.)
Alpha Epsilon	Epsilon	March 26, 1925	Birmingham–Southern College	Birmingham, Alabama	Inactive	
Alpha Zeta		192x ?–1929	Missouri Wesleyan College	Cameron, Missouri	Inactive	
Alpha Eta		March 1926	Carthage College	Kenosha, Wisconsin	Withdrew (local)	(Note: At the time of national dissolution, this chapter withdrew and became the Theta Chi Delta/Chemistry Club (local).)
Alpha Theta		April 3, 1926 – 1943	College of William & Mary	Williamsburg, Virginia	Inactive	(Note: Chapter formed from Delta Pi Sigma, a local honorary chemistry fraternity.)
Alpha Iota		April 9, 1927	Wittenberg College	Springfield, Ohio	Inactive	
Alpha Kappa		before June 1927	Ohio University	Athens, Ohio	Inactive	
Alpha Lambda		192x ?	Converse College	Spartanburg, South Carolina	Inactive	
Alpha Mu		May 31, 1929	Central College	Fayette, Missouri	Inactive	(Note: Chapter formed from the T. Berry Smith Chemistry Club, a local group established in 1927.)
Alpha Nu		May 2, 1931	William Jewell College	Liberty, Missouri	Inactive	(Note: Chapter formed from the Khem Club, a local organization established in 1916.)

== See also ==
- Professional fraternities and sororities
