= Bouchet Graduate Honor Society =

American doctorate honor society

- BGHS
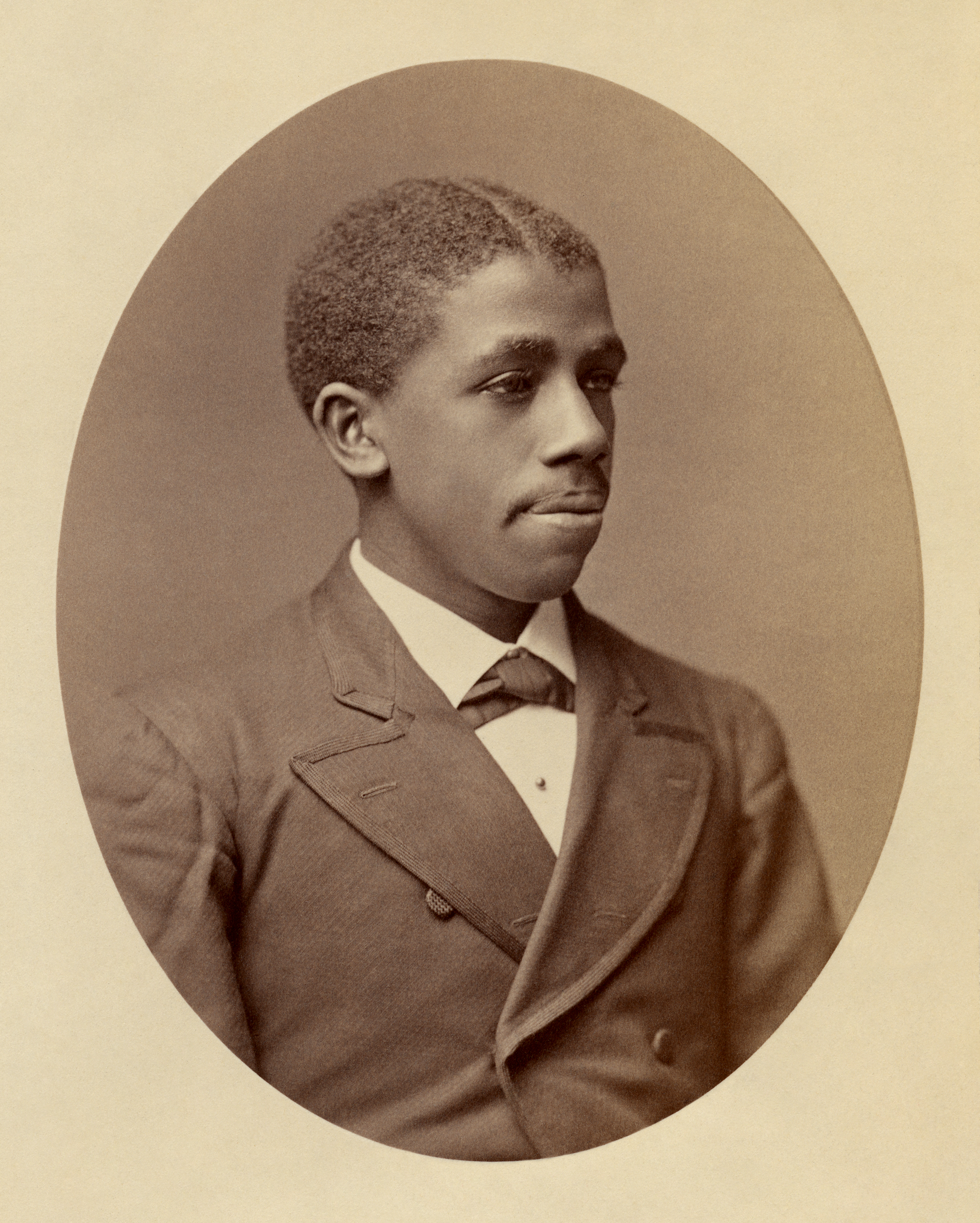
- Founded: September 15, 2005; 21 years ago: Yale University; Howard University
- Type: Honor
- Affiliation: Independent
- Status: Active
- Emphasis: Doctoral, Post-Doctoral, Faculty
- Scope: National (US)
- Chapters: 19
- Headquarters: United States
- Website: Official Website

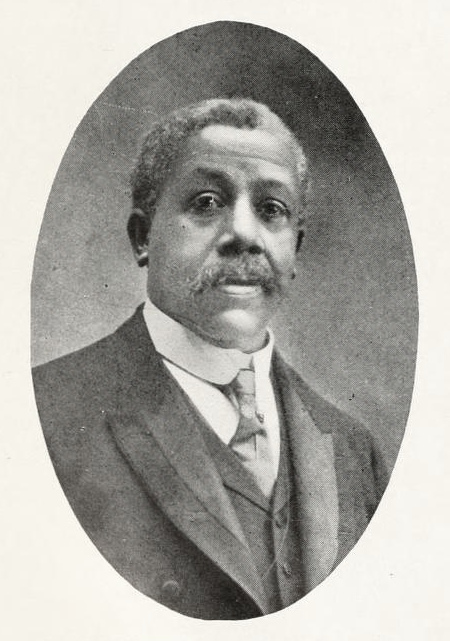
Bouchet, c. 1912 Namesake of the Bouchet Graduate Honor Society

The Edward Alexander Bouchet Graduate Honor Society (often referred to as the Bouchet Graduate Honor Society, Bouchet Society or BGHS) is an American honor society named after Edward Alexander Bouchet, the first African American to earn a doctorate degree (Ph.D. in Physics, Yale University, 1876). Established to recognize outstanding scholarly achievement and promote diversity and excellence in doctoral education and the professoriate, it was co-founded by Yale University and Howard University on September 15, 2005, commemorating Bouchet's birthday.

== History ==
The Edward Alexander Bouchet Graduate Honor Society was co-founded by Yale University and Howard University on September 15, 2005, in commemoration of Bouchet's birthday. Inaugurated with a simulcast ceremony between Yale and Howard, the founding institutions reflect a commitment to combating historical underrepresentation in academia.

Honor societies have historically been critiqued for systemic bias and racism, often reflecting broader societal inequities in their membership and recognition practices. Traditional honor societies have sometimes perpetuated exclusion by upholding criteria or cultures that do not fully recognize the diverse potential of all scholars, particularly those from minority backgrounds. The Bouchet Society was established in part to address these gaps, emphasizing inclusivity and the importance of diverse scholarly contributions.

The Bouchet Society aims to develop a network of preeminent scholars who exemplify academic and personal excellence, foster supportive environments, and serve as exemplars of scholarship, leadership, character, service, and advocacy for those traditionally underrepresented in the academy.

The Bouchet Society has expanded to include numerous chapters across the United States.

== Membership ==
Membership is granted to individuals who demonstrate significant achievements aligned with the society's core values, including doctoral students, postdoctoral fellows, and faculty members. A distinct aspect of the society's nomination process is its focus on self-nominations and endorsements from faculty, encouraging applications from underrepresented groups such as minorities and women in STEM.

== Activities and awards ==
The society organizes annual conferences and forums, fostering professional development, networking, and academic exchange among members. These events also serve as platforms for discussing and promoting DEI initiatives within higher education.

The Bouchet Leadership Medal recognizes leaders who exemplify outstanding scholarly and community-oriented achievements, serving as role models in both academic and broader social contexts.

== Chapters ==
Following is a list of Bouchet Society chapters.

Chapter	Charter date	Location	Status	Ref.
Yale University	September 15, 2005	New Haven, Connecticut	Active	
Howard University	September 15, 2005	Washington, D.C.	Active	
Cornell University	2006	Ithaca, New York	Active	
Washington University in St. Louis	2007	St. Louis, Missouri	Active	
University of Michigan	2008	Ann Arbor, Michigan	Active	
George Washington University	2009	Washington, D.C.	Active	
University of California, San Diego	2010	San Diego, California	Active	
University of Wisconsin–Madison	2010	Madison, Wisconsin	Active	
The Chicago School	2013	Chicago, Illinois	Active	
Virginia Tech	2015	Blacksburg, Virginia	Active	
Northwestern University	2017	Evanston, Illinois	Active	
Johns Hopkins University	April 2018	Baltimore, Maryland	Active	
Michigan State University	April 5, 2019	East Lansing, Michigan	Active	
Emory University	2019	Atlanta, Georgia	Active	
Florida International University	2023	University Park, Florida	Active	
Rutgers University			Active	
University of California, Los Angeles		Los Angeles, California	Active	
University of Florida		Gainesville, Florida	Active	
University of Miami		Coral Gables, Florida	Active	
