= Pi Epsilon Tau =

American honor society

- ΠΕΤ
- Pi Epsilon Tau key
- Founded: 1947; 79 years ago University of Oklahoma
- Type: Honor
- Affiliation: Independent
- Status: Active
- Emphasis: Petroleum engineering
- Scope: National
- Colors: Black and Gold
- Flower: Red rose
- Patron saint: Saint Patrick
- Chapters: 20 active
- Headquarters: United States

Pi Epsilon Tau (ΠΕΤ) is an American honor society for petroleum engineering students. Its purpose is to maintain the standards and high ideals of the petroleum engineering profession and to build a bond between its members and the industry. The society was established in 1947 at the University of Oklahoma.

== History ==
Faculty member Paul S. Johnson established Pi Epsilon Tau at the University of Oklahoma in November 1947 as an honor society for petroleum engineering students. It was officially recognized by the university on January 7, 1948. The honor society's purpose is to maintain the standards and high ideals of the petroleum engineering profession and to build a bond between its members and the industry.

Pi Epsilon Tau's founders planned to expand it to other campuses, creating a national honor society. Its Beta chapter was established at the University of Tulsa in 1948. Gamma was formed at Texas Tech University in 1949. Other chapters were established at colleges across the United States.

It is governed through a national council of five members and a national convention.

== Symbols ==
The emblem or key of Pi Epsilon Tau is shaped like an oil derrick, standing on the base of an isosceles triangle. Its flag features the emblem on top of a three-leaf clover that symbolizes Saint Patrick.

The society's colors are black and gold. Its flower is the red rose. Its pledges are called "roustabouts".

== Membership ==
Membership in Pi Epsilon Tau is open to juniors, seniors, and graduate students studying petroleum engineering based on academic achievement, leadership, and sociability. Pi Epsilon Tau has three classes of members: active (students), honorary, and alumnus.

== Chapters ==
Following are the chapters of Pi Epsilon Tau, with active chapters indicated in bold and inactive chapters in italics.

Chapter	Charter date	Institution	Location	Status	Ref.
**Alpha**	1947	University of Oklahoma	Norman, Oklahoma	Active	
**Beta**	1948	University of Tulsa	Tulsa, Oklahoma	Active	
**Gamma**	1949	Whitacre College of Engineering, Texas Tech University	Lubbock, Texas	Active	
**Delta**		Louisiana State University	Baton Rouge, Louisiana	Active	
Epsilon		University of Southern California	Los Angeles, California	Inactive	
**Zeta**	1951	Marietta College	Marietta, Ohio	Active	
**Eta**		University of California, Berkeley	Berkeley, California	Active	
**Theta**		Pennsylvania State University	State College, Pennsylvania	Active	
**Iota**		Louisiana Tech University	Ruston, Louisiana	Active	
**Kappa**	1970	University of Texas at Austin	Austin, Texas	Active	(Note: Chapter was established in 1961.)
**Lambda**		West Virginia University	Morgantown, West Virginia	Active	
**Mu**		Missouri University of Science and Technology	Rolla, Missouri	Active	
**Nu**		Mississippi State University	Mississippi State, Mississippi	Active	
**Xi**		Montana Technological University	Butte, Montana	Active	
**Omicron**		Texas A&M University	College Station, Texas	Active	
Pi		New Mexico Institute of Mining and Technology	Socorro, New Mexico	Inactive	
**Rho**		University of Louisiana at Lafayette	Lafayette, Louisiana	Active	
**Sigma**		University of Wyoming	Laramie, Wyoming	Active	
**Tau**		Colorado School of Mines	Golden, Colorado	Active	
**Upsilon**		Texas A&M University–Kingsville	Kingsville, Texas	Active	
**Phi**		University of Houston	Houston, Texas	Active	
