= Pi Alpha Xi =

American horticultural honor society

- ΠΑΞ
- Founded: June 1, 1923; 103 years ago Cornell University
- Type: Honor
- Affiliation: Independent
- Status: Active
- Emphasis: Horticulture
- Scope: National (US)
- Motto: "Always to Excel"
- Colors: Nile green and Cerulean blue
- Symbol: Stylus, Nile Lotus, Egyptian hoe, Ancient Vase
- Flower: Nile Lotus
- Publication: Lotus Leaflet
- Chapters: 42
- Members: 14,000+ lifetime
- Headquarters: c/o Angie Lower, American Society for Horticultural Science; 1018 Duke Street; Alexandria, Virginia 22314; United States
- Website: www.pialphaxi.org

Pi Alpha Xi (ΠΑΞ) is an American collegiate honor society for horticulture founded in 1923 at Cornell University.

== History ==
After attending the 1923 International Flower Show in New York City, a group from Cornell University had the idea to start the honor society. Under the leadership of Professor Arno Nehrling, the Pi Alpha Xi constitution, ritual, and insignia/key were developed. Alpha chapter was installed at Cornell on June 1, 1923.

Pi Alpha Xi was established as an honor society for floriculture and ornamental horticulture but later changed to include all horticultural disciplines. Its mission is promoting fellowship, professional leadership, and scholarship and to enrich life through plants. Chapters are located in four-year colleges and universities that have horticultural programs.

By 1950, Pi Alpha Xi, chapters were established at the University of Illinois Urbana-Champaign (Beta), Pennsylvania State University (Gamma), Michigan State University (Delta), Ohio State University (Epsilon), Rutgers University (Zeta), Washington State University (Eta), and the University of Maryland, College Park (Theta). The society's added a significant number of chapters during the 1970s. As of January 24, 2024, Pi Alpha Xi has forty chapters and 14,000 members. Its publication is the Lotus Leaflet.

Pi Alpha Xi is managed by the American Society for Horticultural Science (ASHS), based in Alexandria, Virginia. Its annual business meeting is held in conjunction with the ASHS annual conference.

== Symbols ==
The society's name was selected to represent:

- Pi (Π) – the first letter of polumathia, or scholarship;
- Alpha (Α) - from the word anthemorgous, meaning to work with plants;
- Xi (Ξ) – for zunoia, signifying the bond among gardeners, educators, and professional horticulturists.

Its colors are Nile green and cerulean blue, and its flower is the Nile lotus. Its symbols include the stylus, the Nile lotus, the Egyptian hoe, and the ancient vase. The motto of Pi Alpha Xi is "Always to Excel".

Its badge is a pin or key which is inscribed with the Greek letters ΠΑΞ and the stylus, Egyptian hoe, Nile lotus, and the ancient vase.

== Membership ==
Membership is open to undergraduate students who are juniors and seniors interested in floriculture, landscape horticulture, or ornamental horticulture who meet GPA requirements. Faculty and graduate students are also eligible for membership. The society also issues honorary memberships.

== Activities ==
Primarily, Pi Alpha Xi exists to recognize academic excellence. The national society sponsors the Pi Alpha Phi Annual Photography Contest, and publishes the Pi Alpha Xi Flower Judging Manual. It also recognizes Fellows from the Pi Alpha Phi membership for service or excellence in floriculture, landscape horticulture, ornamental horticulture, or Pi Alpha Phi. There is a limit of 25 living Fellows.

Some chapters also sponsor field trips to horticultural sites and lectures with guest speakers. Chapters also sponsor scholarships so that members can attend the ASHS conference. The national organization matches local scholarships.

== Chapters ==
Following is a list of Pi Alpha Xi chapters. Active chapters are indicated in bold. Inactive chapters and institutions are in italics.

Chapter	Charter date and range	Institution	Location	Status	Ref.
Alpha	June 1, 1923	Cornell University	Ithaca, New York	Active	
Beta	April 2, 1924	University of Illinois Urbana-Champaign	Urbana, Illinois	Active	
Gamma	May 29, 1926	Pennsylvania State University	University Park, Pennsylvania	Active	
Delta	April 12, 1929	Michigan State University	East Lansing, Michigan	Active	
Epsilon	January 6, 1929	Ohio State University	Columbus, Ohio	Active	
Zeta	November 16, 1933	Rutgers University	New Brunswick, New Jersey	Active	
Eta	March 12, 1949	Washington State University	Pullman, Washington	Active	
Theta	September 14, 1949	University of Maryland, College Park	College Park, Maryland	Active	
Iota	February 15, 1957	North Carolina State University	Raleigh, North Carolina	Active	
Kappa	June 1, 1968	Virginia Tech	Blacksburg, Virginia	Active	
Lambda	May 28, 1968	University of Minnesota	Saint Paul, Minnesota	Active	
Mu	May 16, 1974	University of Florida	Gainesville, Florida	Active	
Nu	May 30, 1974	Auburn University	Auburn, Alabama	Active	
Xi	December 1, 1974	New Mexico State University	Las Cruces, New Mexico	Active	
Omicron	February 23, 1975	Purdue University	West Lafayette, Indiana	Active	
Pi	April 17, 1975	Clemson University	Clemson, South Carolina	Active	
Rho	March 1, 1975	University of Wisconsin–Madison	Madison, Wisconsin	Active	
Sigma	April 2, 1975	Southern Illinois University Carbondale	Carbondale, Illinois	Active	
Tau	May 30, 1975	University of Georgia	Athens, Georgia	Active	
Upsilon	September 1, 1975	California Polytechnic State University, San Luis Obispo	San Luis Obispo, California	Active	
Phi	October 29, 1975	South Dakota State University	Brookings, South Dakota	Active	
Psi	May 31, 1978	Texas A&M University	College Station, Texas	Active	
Chi	May 29, 1975	Colorado State University	Fort Collins, Colorado	Active	
Omega	March 16, 1979	Kansas State University	Manhattan, Kansas	Active	
Alpha Beta	May 26, 1980	University of Tennessee	Knoxville, Tennessee	Active	
Alpha Gamma	April 23, 1982	University of Nebraska–Lincoln	Lincoln, Nebraska	Active	
Alpha Delta	April 24, 1983	Oklahoma State University–Stillwater	Stillwater, Oklahoma	Active	
Alpha Epsilon	Spring 1984	University of California, Davis	Davis, California	Active	
Alpha Zeta	May 16, 1985	University of Wisconsin–River Falls	River Falls, Wisconsin	Active	
Alpha Eta	Spring 1985	Delaware Valley University	Doylestown, Pennsylvania	Active	
Alpha Theta	November 6, 1986	Iowa State University	Ames, Iowa	Active	
Alpha Iota	March 24, 1988	Texas Tech University	Lubbock, Texas	Active	
Alpha Kappa	Spring 1990	Mississippi State University	Starkville, Mississippi	Active	
Alpha Lambda	February 1, 1992	Florida A&M University	Tallahassee, Florida	Active	
Alpha Mu	Spring 1992	Temple University	Philadelphia, Pennsylvania	Active	
Alpha Nu	June 2, 1995	Utah State University	Logan, Utah	Active	
Alpha Xi	April 18, 2005	Texas State University	San Marcos, Texas	Active	
Alpha Omicron	May 2, 2006	University of Arkansas	Fayetteville, Arkansas	Active	
Alpha Pi	May 4, 2006	University of Wisconsin–Platteville	Platteville, Wisconsin	Active	
Alpha Rho	February 13, 2012	Oregon State University	Corvallis, Oregon	Active	
Alpha Sigma	October 13, 2015	University of Wyoming	Laramie, Wyoming	Active	
Alpha Tau	September 21, 2015	University of Maine	Orono, Maine	Active	
