= Quaternion Senior Order =

Senior society at Furman University, US

- QSO
- Founded: May 1, 2023; 3 years ago Furman University
- Type: Honor
- Affiliation: Indepdent
- Status: Active
- Emphasis: Seniors
- Scope: Local
- Chapters: 1
- Former name: Quaternion Club; Senior Order
- Headquarters: Greenville, South Carolina; United States

Quaternion Senior Order (QSO) is an honor society for seniors at Furman University in Greenville, South Carolina, US. It was formed in 2023 by the merger of the Quaternion Club for men and the Senior Order for women. This senior society is the highest honor awarded to students at the university.

== History ==
=== Predecessor organizations ===
==== Quaternion Club ====
The Quaternion Club was an honor society for upperclassmen that was founded in 1903 at Furman University. Its founders were Clement F. Haynesworth, J. C. Keys, R. M. Mauldin, and I. Rex Rice. Quaternion was considered to the be university's highest honor. Quaternion met in Old College, the university's first building, and also maintained the building and its grounds. When its members were initiated, they signed the Quaternion register and received a key to Old College.

In 1927, Quaternion was asked to join Omicron Delta Kappa, a national honor society, but declined the invitation.

The Quaternion Club tapped four junior and four senior men each year. Members were selected for character, integrity, leadership, loyalty, and scholarship. In October 1933, it had initiated 165 members. Its members included two South Carolina governors, congressmen, and three presidents of Furman University. The club's member list was public.

==== Senior Order ====
Senior Order was a women's counterpart to the Quaternion Club that was founded under the guidance of Virginia Thomas, dean of the Women's College at Fiurman University. It was established in 1937 as a leadership and service-oriented society for senior women of the Women's College. It recognized the qualities of integrity, leadership, service, and scholarship in senior women. Its members were supposed to was to "foster scholarship, citizenship, and leadership; to organize and work out some definite project for the school; and to meet any need which they may recognize in the student body."

Each year, the members of Senior Order determined its projects, allowing the organization to respond to current needs as expressed by the university's administration, student body officers, class officers, and student organizations. In 1951, the Senior Order focused on fundraising for scholarships.

Senior Order tapped eight to fifteen rising senior women each spring, inducting its first class in 1938. However, its membership could not exceed twelve percent of the junior class. Members were selected by its current members, two faculty members, and the college's dean for showing leadership, outstanding abilities, and meritorious service through their service to the college or community, as well as proving to be "cooperative citizens" who had demonstrated personal growth. Senior Order did not restrict its members from joining other honor societies or sororities. By 2016, Senior had more than 500 alumnae. Its membership was publicly announced each year.

=== QSO ===
Quaternion Senior Order (QSO) was established on May 1, 2023, at Furman University. It was created through the merger of the Quaternion Club and the Senior Order. QSO established new traditions, while also retaining some of the traditions and rituals of the predecessor organizations. It continues the tradition of selecting student members who "possess dedicated leadership, determined pursuit of knowledge, disciplined character, and devotion to the Furman community".

== Membership ==
Quaternion Senior Order admits sixteen rising seniors each spring. QSO selects members based on "outstanding dedication to leadership, determination as a scholar, discipline to serve the needs of others and devotion to and love for the university and its broader community". The group has the option of admitting honorary members. Membership are publicly shared by the university.

== Notable members ==
- Gordon W. Blackwell, president of Florida State University and Furman University

== See also ==
- List of senior societies
