= Phi Alpha Epsilon =

Architectural engineering honor society

- ΦΑΕ
- Founded: 1984; 42 years ago Kansas State University
- Type: Honor
- Affiliation: Independent
- Status: Active
- Emphasis: Architectural Engineering
- Scope: National
- Colors: Purple and White
- Chapters: 4 active
- Headquarters: 918 North Martin Luther King Jr. Drive; Manhattan, Kansas 66506; United States

Phi Alpha Epsilon (ΦΑΕ) is an American collegiate honor society for architectural engineering. It was established at Kansas State University in Manhattan, Kansas in 1980.

== History ==
In the fall of 1980, students in the Department of Architectural Engineering & Construction Science at Kansas State University in Manhattan, Kansas formed an interest group to consider creating an academic honorary society. They were assisted by Charles Bissey, professor of architectural engineering and construction science. As a result, Kappa Sigma Alpha Epsilon (KSAE) was established. In the spring of 1981, its seven charter members and eight pledges were installed. Bissey served as the group's academic advisor.

After other architectural engineering programs expressed an interest in joining KSAE, a discussion took place during the 1983–84 academic year. The group became a national academic honorary society in the fall of 1984, with the name change to Phi Alpha Epsilon. The honor society's function was to reward academic achievement in architectural engineering and to recognize outstanding alumni.

Charter of the Beta chapter at the University of Kansas

Kansas State University was chartered as the Alpha chapter of Phi Alpha Epsilon in the spring of 1985. Bissey served faculty advisor for the Alpha chapter until his retirement in December 2003. A second chapter, Beta, was chartered at the University of Kansas on November 3, 1984. Other chapters following, including Delta at the University of Texas at Austin in 1998 and Eta at Tennessee State University in 1995.

As of 2025, Phi Alpha Epsilon has chartered at nine chapters, with four remaining active. Alpha chapter is located at 918 North Martin Luther King Jr. Drive in Manhattan, Kansas.

== Symbols ==
The society's colors are purple and white.

== Activities ==
Members of Phi Alpha Epsilon hold social events and tutor for department classes.

The society offers scholarships to its members through its Phi Alpha Epsilon Scholarship fund. The fund was established with $6,900 in gifts from architectural firms and architectural engineering graduates. In 1998, Duane Henderson, one of the Phi Alpha Epsilon's founding members, expanded the scholarship fund with a gift of $14,000. The scholarship fund is managed by the Kansas State University Foundation.

== Membership ==
Phi Alpha Epsilon members must be a junior or a senior seeking a degree in architectural engineering who have completed fifteen hours in the program with at least a 3.25 grade point average. Students who qualify for membership receive an invitation to join. New members are inducted once each semester.

== Chapters ==
Following is a list of Phi Alpha Epsilon chapters, with active chapters indicated in bold and inactive chapters in italics.

| Chapter | Charter date and range | Institution | Location | Status | Ref. |
|---|---|---|---|---|---|
| **Alpha** | 1985 | Kansas State University | Manhattan, Kansas | Active | (Note: Chapter was formed from Kappa Sigma Alpha Epsilon (local), established in 1981.) |
| **Beta** | November 3, 1984 | University of Kansas | Lawrence, Kansas | Active | |
| Gamma ? | 198x ?–20xx ? | Pennsylvania State University | State College, Pennsylvania | Inactive | |
| **Delta** | 1988 | University of Texas at Austin | Austin, Texas | Active | |
| Epsilon ? | 19xx ?–xxxx ? | University of Miami | Coral Gables, Florida | Inactive | |
| Zeta | April 30, 1995–xxxx ? | North Carolina A&T State University | Greensboro, North Carolina | Inactive | |
| **Eta** | April 30, 1995 | Tennessee State University | Nashville, Tennessee | Active | |
| Theta | Spring 2012–20xx ? | Lawrence Technological University | Southfield, Michigan | Inactive | |
| Iota | 2014–20xx ? | University of Cincinnati | Cincinnati, Ohio | Inactive | |

== Notable members ==
- Wendell Lady (Alpha, honorary, 1982), Speaker of the Kansas House of Representatives and architectural engineer

== See also ==
- Tau Beta Pi
- Honor society
- Association of College Honor Societies (ACHS)
