= Honor society =

Organization that recognizes excellence

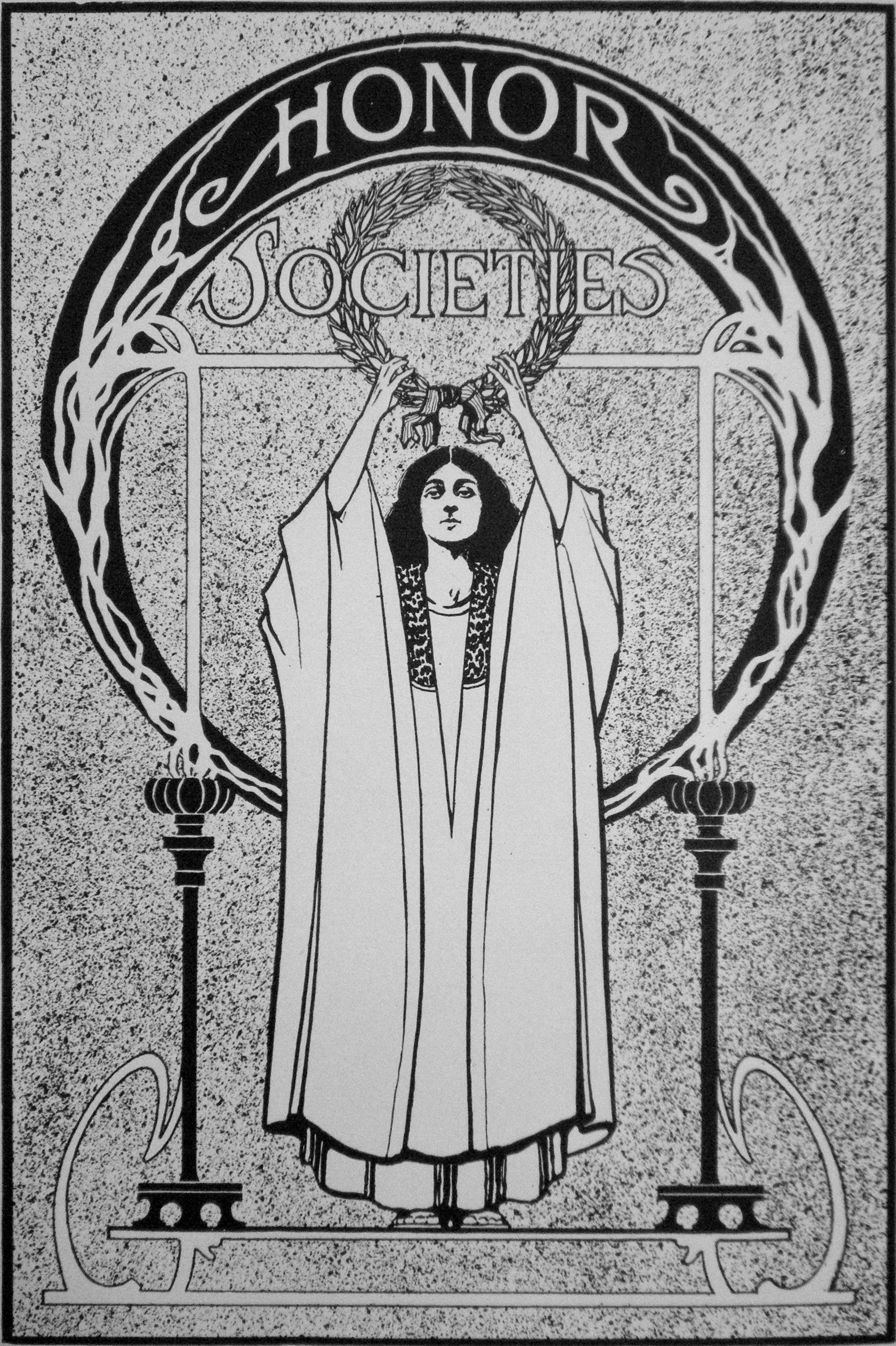
"Honor Societies", illustration from the 1909 Tyee (yearbook of the University of Washington)

In the United States, an honor society is an organization that recognizes individuals who rank above a set standard in various domains such as academics, leadership, and other personal achievements, not all of which are based on ranking systems. These societies acknowledge excellence among peers in diverse fields and circumstances. The Order of the Arrow, for example, is the National Honor Society of the Boy Scouts of America. While the term commonly refers to scholastic honor societies, which primarily acknowledge students who excel academically or as leaders among their peers, it also applies to other types of societies.

== History ==
The origins of honor societies in the United States can be traced back to the establishment of Phi Beta Kappa in 1776 at the College of William and Mary, which began as a debating society and did not initially impose grade point average (GPA) restrictions for membership.

Many honor societies invite students to become members based on the scholastic rank (the top x% of a class) and/or grade point averages, either overall or for classes taken within the discipline for which the honor society provides recognition. In cases where academic achievement would not be an appropriate criterion for membership, other standards are usually required for membership (such as completion of a particular ceremony or training program). Scholastic honor societies commonly add a criterion relating to the student's character. Most honor societies are invitation-only, and membership in an honor society might be considered exclusive, i.e., a member of such an organization cannot join other honor societies representing the same field.

Many honor societies are referred to by their membership or by non-members as fraternities and sororities. Honor societies exist at the high school, collegiate/university, postgraduate, and professional levels, although university honor societies are by far the most prevalent. In the United States, the oldest academic society, Phi Beta Kappa, was founded as a social and literary fraternity in 1776. Other honor societies were established a century later, including Tau Beta Pi for engineering (1885), Sigma Xi for scientific research (1886), and Phi Kappa Phi for all disciplines (1897). Mortar Board was established in 1918 and was the first national honor society for women who were college seniors.

During the era of honor society expansion in the early 20th century, these organizations were generally supportive of cultural changes that challenged racism, classism, and sexism. Like other aspects of academia, honor society integration and diversity grew with the expansion of an increasingly multicultural and co-educational student body. There were some holdouts, but academia in general, and its honor societies as a reflection, were on the vanguard of change. Several Jewish-only organizations merged into (or absorbed) formerly Christian-exclusive societies. Title IX forced most single-sex societies to admit women, though many had already opted to embrace this change. (Note: Some professional fraternities continue to maintain single-sex housing, whereas honor societies, in almost all cases non-residential, more readily accepted a co-ed model.) Racial barriers, where they existed, were challenged and retired, with any holdouts subject to significant criticism. The presence of these holdovers and the demise of those that exhibited overt racism offer an opportunity for a critical reassessment of the criteria and culture within honor societies.

While changes sparked from within these societies were prevalent between the massive influx of students after World War II and before and after the adoption of Title IX, additionally, the demand for recognition of racially diverse scholars spurred the 2005 founding of the Bouchet Graduate Honor Society by Yale University and Howard University. Rather than adopting the traditional tapping to identify top students from a given academic class based on merit, a distinct aspect of this society's nomination process is its focus on self-nominations. (Note: This follows the model of "recognition societies", which Baird's Manual tracked as a separate category of fraternal society but is now grouped within the larger set of honor societies.) A Ph.D. or Ph.D. track is required, among other qualifications. Modern honor societies are increasingly focused on creating supportive environments that promote the academic and personal development of all scholars, especially those from traditionally underrepresented groups. This evolution reflects a broader movement within academic institutions towards a more equitable and comprehensive recognition of student excellence.

== Regalia ==
Academic robes and regalia identifying by color the degree, school, and other distinctions, are controlled under rules of the voluntary Intercollegiate Code of Academic Costume. In addition, various colored devices such as stoles, scarves, cords, tassels, and medallions are used to indicate membership in a student's honor society. Of these, cords and mortarboard tassels are most often used to indicate membership. Most institutions allow honor cords, tassels, and/or medallions for honor society members. Stoles are less common, but they are available for a few honor societies. Virtually all, if not all honor societies have chosen such colors and may sell these items of accessory regalia as a service or fundraiser.

== Umbrella organizations ==
The Honor Society Caucus and Association of College Honor Societies (ACHS) are two voluntary associations for national collegiate and post-graduate honor societies. ACHS formed in 1925 to establish and maintain desirable standards for honor societies. Later, four founding members of ACHS established the Honor Society Caucus, expressing that the ACHS had diluted and lost sight of the mission of its founding members. While ACHS membership is a certification that the member societies meet these standards, not all legitimate honor societies apply for membership in ACHS.

== Collegiate honor societies ==
Notable national and international honor societies based in or at schools include the following.

=== General and leadership societies ===
General collegiate societies are open to all academic disciplines, although they may have other affinity requirements. Leadership societies recognize leadership, with a multi-disciplinary scholarship component.

Society	Symbols	Emphasis	Colors	Status	Ref.
Alpha Alpha Alpha	ΑΑΑ	General, first-generation college students	Blue and Grey/Silver	Active	
Alpha Chi	ΑΧ	General	Emerald green and Sapphire blue	Active	
Alpha Kappa Mu	ΑΚΜ	General	Royal blue and White	Active	
Alpha Lambda Delta	ΑΛΔ	General, Freshman	Maroon and Gold	Active	
Alpha Sigma Lambda	ΑΣΛ	General, Non-traditional students	Burgundy and Gold	Active	
Alpha Sigma Nu	ΑΣΝ	General, scholarship and service at Jesuit institutions of higher education	Maroon Gold	Active	
Bouchet Graduate Honor Society		General, Doctoral and Post-Doctoral		Active	
Chi Alpha Sigma	ΧΑΣ	General, student athletes	Gold and Black	Active	
Delta Alpha Pi	ΔΑΠ	General, students with disabilities	Royal blue and Gold	Active	
Delta Epsilon Sigma	ΔΕΣ	General at traditionally Catholic colleges	Black and Gold	Active	
Delta Epsilon Tau	ΔΕΤ	General, Distance Education Accrediting Commission institutions		Active	
Epsilon Tau Pi	ΕΤΠ	General, Eagle Scouts	White, Red, Blue, and Black	Active	
Golden Key International Honour Society		General	Navy Blue, Gold, and White	Active	
Ku Klux Klan		Interfraternity leadership, Juniors	Black	Inactive	
Lambda Sigma	ΛΣ	Scholarship, leadership, and service	Blue and Gold	Active	
Mortar Board		General, Juniors and Seniors	Gold and Silver	Active	
National Residence Hall Honorary		Residence hall leadership and service	Blue and White	Active	
National Society of Collegiate Scholars		Leadership, scholarship, and service	Purple and Gold	Active	
Omicron Delta Kappa	ΟΔΚ	Leadership and scholarship, upperclassmen and graduate students	Sky blue, White, and Black	Active	
Order of Omega		General, fraternities and sororities	Ivory and Gold	Active	
Phi Beta Kappa	ΦΒΚ	Arts and sciences, undergraduate	Pink and Sky blue	Active	
Phi Eta Sigma	ΦΗΣ	General, freshman	Gold and Black	Active	
Phi Kappa Phi	ΦΚΦ	General	Blue and Gold	Active	
Phi Sigma Pi	ΦΣΠ	General	Purple and Gold	Active	
Phi Tau Phi	ΦΤΦ	General		Active	
SALUTE Veterans National Honor Society		General, veterans and active military		Active	
Scabbard and Blade		General, ROTC. JROTC. and midshipmen	Red, White, and Blue	Active	
Sigma Alpha Lambda	ΣΑΛ	Leadership and scholarship	Navy, Black, and Gold	Active	
Tau Sigma	ΤΣ	General, transfer students	Burgundy and Gold	Active	

=== Humanities ===
These societies are open to Humanities disciplines and may be department-specific.

Society	Symbols	Academic emphasis	Colors	Status	Ref.
Alpha Iota Sigma	ΑΙΣ	Interdisciplinary studies		Active	
Alpha Mu Gamma	ΑΜΓ	First-year foreign languages	Gold	Active	
Alpha Phi Epsilon	ΑΦΕ	Literary and forensics	Garnet and Green	Inactive	
Alpha Psi Omega	ΑΨΩ	Theatre	Light Blue and Antique gold	Active	(Note: In theater lighting, a "bastard" color is a lighting gel that has been mixed with a small amount of a complimentary color, creating a more natural result. See Bastard color.)
Alpha Upsilon Alpha	ΑΥΑ	Reading and language arts	Gold and Silver	Active	
Beta Pi Theta	ΒΠΘ	French	Royal Purple, Gold and White	Inactive	
Chi Tau Epsilon	ΧΤΕ	Dance		Active	
Delta Epsilon Chi	ΔΕΧ	Divinity		Active	
Delta Phi Alpha	ΔΦΑ	German	Black, Red, and Gold	Active	
Delta Phi Delta	ΔΦΔ	Art	Red and Bright blue	Active	
Eta Sigma Phi	ΗΣΦ	Classics	Purple and Gold	Active	
Kappa Kappa Psi	ΚΚΨ	Music - band	Blue White	Active	
Kappa Pi	ΚΠ	Art	Purple and Gold	Active	
Kappa Tau Alpha	ΚΤΑ	Journalism and mass communication	Light blue and Gold	Active	
Lambda Iota Tau	ΛΙΤ	Literature	Purple and Gold	Active	
Lambda Pi Eta	ΛΠΗ	Communication	Crimson and Silver	Active	
Mu Beta Psi	ΜΒΨ	Music	Red and White	Active	
Omega Xi Alpha	ΩΞΑ	Journalism		Active	
Phi Sigma Iota	ΦΣΙ	Foreign languages, literatures, or cultures	Purple and White	Active	
Phi Sigma Tau	ΦΣΤ	Philosophy	White and Purple	Active	
Pi Delta Phi	ΠΔΦ	French	Blue, White, and Red	Active	
Pi Kappa Lambda	ΠΚΛ	Music	Gold and White	Active	
Pi Nu Epsilon	ΠΝΕ	Music		Active	
Sigma Delta Pi	ΣΔΠ	Spanish and Portuguese	Red and Gold	Active	
Sigma Tau Delta	ΣΤΔ	English	Cardinal and Black	Active	
Society for Collegiate Journalists	SCJ	Journalism		Active	
Tau Beta Sigma	ΤΒΣ	Music - band	White and Blue	Active	
Theta Alpha Kappa	ΘΑΚ	Religious studies, theology, and philosophy	Red and Gold	Active	
Theta Alpha Phi	ΘΑΦ	Theatre	Purple and White	Active	
Theta Chi Beta	ΘΧΒ	Religious studies		Active	

=== Social sciences ===
These societies are open to social science disciplines and may be department-specific.

Society	Symbols	Academic emphasis	Colors	Status	Ref.
Alpha Iota Delta	ΑΙΔ	Decision sciences	Green and Gold	Active	
Alpha Kappa Delta	ΑΚΔ	Sociology	Teal	Active	
Alpha Mu Alpha	ΑΜΑ	Marketing	Red	Active	
Alpha Phi Sigma	ΑΦΣ	Criminal justice and law	Blue and Gold	Active	
Beta Alpha Psi	ΒΑΨ	Accounting and finance	Crimson and Black	Active	
Beta Gamma Sigma	ΒΓΣ	Business programs accredited by AACSB	Royal blue and Gold	Active	
Chi Sigma Iota	ΧΣΙ	Counseling	White and Blue	Active	
Delta Mu Delta	ΔΜΔ	Business programs accredited by ACBSP	Purple, Gold, and White	Active	
Eta Sigma Delta	ΗΣΔ	Hospitality management	Blue and White	Active	
Eta Sigma Gamma	ΗΣΓ	Health education	Dark green and Gold	Active	
Gamma Theta Upsilon	ΓΘΥ	Geography	Brown, Light blue, and Gold	Active	
Kappa Delta Pi	ΚΔΠ	Education	Purple and Gold	Active	
Kappa Omicron Nu	ΚΟΝ	Human sciences	Maroon and Gold	Active	
Lambda Alpha	ΛΑ	Anthropology	Red, White, and Black	Active	
Lambda Epsilon Chi	ΛΕΧ	Paralegal	Royal purple	Active	
Mu Kappa Tau	ΜΚΤ	Marketing	Navy blue	Active	
Nu Lambda Mu	ΝΛΜ	Nonprofit management		Active	
Omega Rho	ΩΡ	Management science	Blue and Red	Active	
Omicron Chi Epsilon (defunct)	ΟΧΕ	Economics		Active	
Omicron Delta Epsilon	ΟΔΕ	Economics	Royal blue and Gold	Active	
Omicron Delta Gamma (Order of Artus)	ΟΔΓ	Economics		Inactive	
The Order of Barristers		Law school		Active	
Order of the Coif		Law school graduates	Maroon and Black	Active	
Order of the Sword & Shield	ΟΣΣ	Homeland security, emergency management	Blue and Gold	Active	
Phi Alpha Honor Society	ΦΑ	Social work	Royal blue and Light gold	Active	
Phi Alpha Theta	ΦΑΘ	History	Madonna red and Madonna nlue	Active	
Phi Beta Delta	ΦΒΔ	International education	Gold and Red	Active	
Phi Delta Phi	ΦΔΦ	Law	Garnet and Pearl blue	Active	
Phi Sigma Chi	ΦΣΧ	Business administration	Yellow and Blue	Inactive	
Phi Upsilon Omicron	ΦΥΟ	Family and consumer science	White, Yellow, and Violet	Active	
Pi Alpha Alpha	ΠΑΑ	Public administration	Light Blue and Gold	Active	
Pi Gamma Mu	ΠΓΜ	Social sciences	Royal blue and White	Active	
Pi Lambda Theta	ΠΛΘ	Education	Gold	Active	
Pi Omega Pi	ΠΩΠ	Business education	Blue, Silver and Gold	Active	
Pi Sigma Alpha	ΠΣΑ	Political science	Red and Black	Active	
Psi Chi	ΨΧ	Psychology	Platinum and Dark blue	Active	
Sigma Beta Delta	ΣΒΔ	Business, management, and business administration	Hunter green and Gold	Active	
Sigma Iota Rho	ΣΙΡ	International relations	Black, Blue, and Red	Active	
Sigma Nu Tau	ΣΝΤ	Entrepreneurship		Active	
Tau Upsilon Alpha	ΤΥΑ	Human services		Active	
Upsilon Phi Delta	ΥΦΔ	Health administration	Crimson red and Blue	Active	

=== STEM ===
These societies are open to students in the science, technology, engineering, and mathematics disciplines and may be department-specific. This section also includes all healthcare-related fields, including veterinary science.

Society	Symbols	Academic emphasis	Colors	Status	Ref.
Alpha Epsilon	ΑΕ	Agricultural engineering	Black and Gold	Active	
Alpha Epsilon Delta	ΑΕΔ	Pre-medical	Red and Violet	Active	
Alpha Eta	ΑΗ	Allied health professions		Active	
Alpha Eta Mu Beta	ΑΗΜΒ	Biomedical engineering	Red and Gold	Active	
Alpha Mu	ΑΜ	Agricultural systems management		Active	
Alpha Nu Sigma	ΑΝΣ	Nuclear engineering	White	Active	
Alpha Omega Alpha	ΑΩΑ	Medical students and physicians	Green, Gold, and White	Active	
Alpha Pi Mu	ΑΠΜ	Industrial engineering	Purple and Light yellow	Active	
Alpha Sigma Mu	ΑΣΜ	Metallurgy and materials engineering	Silver and Gold	Active	
Beta Beta Beta	ΒΒΒ	Biology	Blood red and Leaf green	Active	
Beta Kappa Chi	ΒΚΧ	Natural Science and Mathematics	Golden yellow and Royal blue	Active	
Beta Phi Mu	ΒΦΜ	Library and information science	Purple and White	Active	
Beta Sigma Kappa	ΒΣΚ	Optometry		Active	
Chi Beta Phi	ΧΒΦ	Science and Mathematics	Colonial blue and Crimson	Active	
Chi Epsilon	ΧΕ	Civil engineering	Purple and White	Active	
Chi Epsilon Pi	ΧΕΠ	Meteorology	Royal blue and Silver	Active	
Delta Tau Alpha	ΔΤΑ	Agriculture	Green and Harvest gold	Active	
Delta Omega	ΔΩ	Public health	Black and Gold; Stole color is Peach	Active	
Epsilon Pi Tau	ΕΠΤ	Technology	Blue, White, and Gold	Active	
Eta Kappa Nu	ΗΚΝ	Electrical engineering and computer engineering	Navy blue and Scarlet	Active	
Gamma Alpha Rho	ΓΑΡ	Aeronautical engineering		Inactive	
Gamma Nu Eta	ΓΝΗ	Information technology		Active	
Gamma Sigma Delta	ΓΣΔ	Agriculture	Sand and Forest green	Active	
Gamma Sigma Epsilon	ΓΣΕ	Chemistry	Royal blue and White	Active	
Iota Tau Alpha	ΙΤΑ	Athletic training		Active	
Iota Sigma Pi	ΙΣΠ	Chemistry and related fields, women	White, Gold, and Cedar green	Active	
Lambda Beta	ΛΒ	Respiratory Care	Blue and Green	Active	
Nu Rho Psi	ΝΡΨ	Neuroscience	Gold and Black	Active	
Omega Chi Epsilon	ΩΧΕ	Chemical engineering	Black, White, and Maroon	Active	
Omicron Kappa Upsilon	ΟΚΥ	Dentistry	Navy blue, Gold, and Lilac	Active	
Phi Alpha Epsilon	ΦΑΕ	Architectural engineering	Purple and White	Active	
Phi Lambda Upsilon	ΦΛΥ	Chemistry	Pink litmus and Blue litmus	Active	
Phi Sigma	ΦΣ	Biological sciences	Medium green, White, and Old gold	Active	
Phi Tau Sigma	ΦΤΣ	Food Science and Technology	Gold and Maroon	Active	
Phi Zeta	ΦΖ	Veterinary medicine	Blue and Yellow	Active	
Pi Alpha Xi	ΠΑΞ	Horticulture	Nile green and Cerulean blue	Active	
Pi Delta	ΠΔ	Podiatry		Active	
Pi Epsilon	ΠΕ	Environmental science	Blue and Green	Active	
Pi Epsilon Tau	ΠΕΤ	Petroleum engineering and related fields	Gold and Black	Active	
Pi Mu	ΠΜ	Medical		Inactive	(Note: Merged with Phi Chi in 1922.)
Pi Tau Sigma	ΠΤΣ	Mechanical engineering	Murrey and Azure	Active	
Rho Beta Epsilon	ΡΒΕ	Robotics	Crimson, Gold, and Black	Active	
Rho Chi	ΡΧ	Pharmacy	Purple and White	Active	
Sigma Gamma Epsilon	ΣΓΕ	Geology and earth science	Gold, Blue, and Silver	Active	
Sigma Gamma Tau	ΣΓΤ	Aerospace engineering	Red and White	Active	
Sigma Lambda Alpha	ΣΛΑ	Landscape architecture	Gold and Green	Active	
Sigma Lambda Chi	ΣΛΧ	Construction management technology	Green and Gold	Active	
Sigma Phi Alpha	ΣΦΑ	Dental hygiene, women	Deep purple Bright gold	Active	
Sigma Phi Omega	ΣΦΩ	Gerontology	Blue and Gold	Active	
Sigma Pi Sigma	ΣΠΣ	Physics and Astronomy	Forest green and Ivory	Active	
Sigma Sigma Phi	ΣΣΦ	Osteopathic medicine and medicine	Crimson and Royal blue	Active	
Sigma Theta Tau	ΣΘΤ	Nursing	Orchid and Fuchsia	Active	
Sigma Xi	ΣΞ	Research in Science and Engineering	Blue and Gold	Active	
Sigma Zeta	ΣΖ	Natural sciences, Mathematics, and Computer science	Blue and White	Active	
Tau Alpha Pi	ΤΑΠ	Engineering technology	Green and Gold	Active	
Tau Beta Pi	ΤΒΠ	Engineering	Seal brown and White	Active	
Tau Sigma Delta	ΤΣΔ	Architecture	White and Gold	Active	
Theta Chi Delta	ΘΧΔ	Chemistry	Gold, Purple, and Black	Inactive	
Upsilon Pi Epsilon	ΥΠΕ	Computer science and computer engineering	Green and Gold	Active	
Xi Sigma Pi	ΞΣΠ	Forestry	Green and Gray	Active	

=== Local collegiate honor societies ===
Some universities have their own independent, open honor societies, which are not affiliated with any national or international organization. Such organizations typically recognize students who have succeeded academically irrespective of their field of study.

Society	Emphasis	Institution	Colors	Status	Ref.
100 Senior Honorary	Leadership, service, activities	Emory University		Active	
Activities Honorary Society	Leadership	University of Illinois at Chicago		Active	
Aquinas Honor Society	General, Seniors	University of St. Thomas		Active	
Aurelian		Yale University		Active	
Bucket & Dipper	Scholarship, service, and leadership; Juniors	Ohio State University		Active	
Buckeye Leadership Society	Leadership	Ohio State University		Active	
Cap and Skull	Service and scholarship, Seniors	Rutgers University		Active	
Cannon and Castle	Military	Yale University		Active	
Chimes Junior Class Honorary	Scholarship, service, and leadership; Juniors	Ohio State University		Active	
Cincinnatus Honorary Society	General	University of Cincinnati		Active	
Dean William Tate Society	Scholarship and activities; Freshmen	University of Georgia		Active	
Der Hexenkreis	Leadership and service; seniors	Cornell University		Active	
Dragon Society	Seniors, extracurricular leadership and contributions	Binghamton University		Inactive	
Florida Blue Key	Leadership	University of Florida		Active	
Friar Society	Seniors	University of Texas at Austin		Active	
Innocents Society	Seniors	University of Nebraska–Lincoln		Active	
Iron Arrow Honor Society	Leadership and scholarship	University of Miami		Active	
Iron Wedge		University of Minnesota		Active	(Note: Was originally an honor society but is now a secret society.)
Lion's Paw Senior Society	Seniors	Pennsylvania State University		Active	
Matteo Ricci Society	General, fellowship candidates	Fordham University		Active	
Mirrors Sophomore Honorary	Scholarship, leadership, and service; Juniors	Ohio State University		Active	
Mountain	Seniors	West Virginia University		Active	
Order of the Golden Bear	Honor and service	University of California, Berkeley		Active	
Owl and Key	Seniors	University of Utah		Active	
Phalanx	Scholarship and activities	Clarkson University		Active	
Phalanx Honor Society	Leadership and service, seniors	Rensselaer Polytechnic Institute		Active	
Phi Alpha Epsilon (local)	Scholarship and service	Lebanon Valley College		Active	
Phi Alpha Epsilon at the University of Maryland College Park	Family science, community health, kinesiology, and public health science	University of Maryland, College Park		Active	
Plumb Bob	Leadership	University of Minnesota		Active	
Quaternion Club	Leadership, scholarship, service	Furman University		Inactive	
Quaternion Senior Order	Leadership, scholarship, service	Furman University		Active	
QEBH	Seniors	University of Missouri		Active	
Quill and Dagger	Leadership and service	Cornell University		Active	
Raven Society	General	University of Virginia		Active	
Raven's Claw Society	Senior males	Dickinson College		Active	
Rho Theta Sigma	Scholarship	Northeastern State University		Active	
Romophos	Leadership, service, and scholarship; Sophomores	Ohio State University		Inactive	
Senior Order	Leadership, scholarship, service	Furman University		Inactive	
Senior Skull Honor Society	Seniors leadership, scholarship, and citizenship	University of Maine		Active	
Sigma Sigma	Upperclassmen	University of Cincinnati		Active	
Sigma Tau Sigma	Textlles	North Carolina State University	Blue and White	Active	
Signet Society	Literary and artistic ability	Harvard University		Active	
Skull and Bones	Seniors	Pennsylvania State University		Active	
Skull and Dagger	Seniors	University of Southern California		Active	
Society of Innocents	Seniors	University of Nebraska–Lincoln		Active	
Sphinx	Senior men	West Virginia University		Inactive	
SPHINX	Scholarship, leadership, citizenship, and service; Seniors	Ohio State University		Active	
Sphinx Head	Seniors	Cornell University		Active	
Texnikoi	Engineering	Ohio State University	Black and Yellow	Active	
Tiger Brotherhood	Service	Clemson University		Active	
Torch		Yale University		Active	
White Key Society	Leadership and service, freshmen and sophomores	Rensselaer Polytechnic Institute		Active	

== Community college, two-year college, and vocational school honor societies ==
Society	Symbols	Emphasis	Colors	Status	Ref.
Alpha Beta Kappa	ΑΒΚ	Private certificate, vocational and trade schools	Red and Blue	Active	
Alpha Beta Gamma	ΑΒΓ	Business at two-year colleges	Black and Red	Active	
Alpha Gamma Sigma	ΑΓΣ	California community colleges		Active	
Beta Phi Gamma	ΒΦΓ	Journalism at two-year colleges		Inactive	
Delta Psi Omega	ΔΨΩ	Theatre at two-year colleges	Light Blue and Antique gold	Active	
Epsilon Phi Delta	ΕΦΔ	German at two-year colleges		Active	
Kappa Beta Delta	ΚΒΔ	Business at community colleges		Active	
La Sociedad Honoraria de la Lengua Española		Spanish at two-year colleges	Red and Gold	Active	
Mu Alpha Theta	ΜΑΘ	Mathematics at two-year colleges	Turquoise blue and Gold	Active	
National Technical Honor Society		Workforce vocational education institutions	Purple, Silver, and White	Active	
Phi Rho Pi	ΦΡΠ	Forensics at two-year colleges		Active	
Phi Theta Kappa	ΦΘΚ	General, community and junior colleges	Blue and Gold	Active	
Psi Beta	ΨΒ	Psychology at two-year colleges	Royal blue and Gold	Active	
Sigma Kappa Delta	ΣΚΔ	English at community and junior colleges	Green and Gold	Active	

== Secondary school honor societies ==
Commonly referred to as high school societies. This list also includes middle school societies.

Society	Symbols	Emphasis	Colors	Status	Ref.
California Scholarship Federation		General		Active	
Computer Science Honor Society		Computer science		Active	
Cum Laude Society		General		Active	
Delta Epsilon Phi	ΔΕΦ	German		Active	
English Language Arts Honor Society		English		Active	
Ephebian Society		General		Active	
International Thespian Society		Theatre	Sapphire and Gold	Active	
Mu Alpha Theta	ΜΑΘ	Mathematics	Turquoise blue and Gold	Active	
National Art Honor Society		Visual arts		Active	
National Business Honor Society		Business, juniors and seniors		Active	
National Beta Club		General	Black and Gold	Active	
National Chinese Honor Society		Chinese		Active	
National English Honor Society		English	Cardinal and Black	Active	
National Honor Society		General	Blue and Gold	Active	
National Honor Society for Dance Arts		Dance		Active	
National Junior Classical League		Latin and Greek		Active	
National Junior Honor Society		General	Blue and White	Active	
National Scholarship Society for Secondary Schools		Genera		Active	
National Society of High School Scholars		General		Active	
National Speech and Debate Association		Public speaking	Red and Silver	Active	
National Technical Honor Society		Vocational education	Purple, Silver, and White	Active	
Quill and Scroll		Journalism	Blue and Gold	Active	
Rho Kappa	ΡΚ	Social studies		Active	
Science National Honor Society		Science		Active	
Sociedad Honoraria Hispánica		Spanish and Portuguese		Active	
Société Honoraire de Français		French	Blue, White, and Red	Active	
Technology Student Association		STEM	Red Blue White	Active	
Tri-M	MMM	Music	Pink	Active	

== Community-based honor societies ==
Society	Symbols	Emphasis	Colors	Status	Ref.
Firecrafter		Boy Scouts Crossroads of America Council		Active	
Order of the Arrow		Boy Scouts of America		Active	
Tribe of Mic-O-Say		Boy Scouts Heart of America Council and Pony Express Council		Active	
Tribe of Tahquitz		Local Boy Scout honor society		Active	

== See also ==
- Association of College Honor Societies (ACHS)
- Honor Society Caucus
- Honor Cords
- Professional fraternities and sororities
