= Order of the Sword & Shield =

American honor society

- OSSNHS or ΟΣΣ
- Founded: 2010; 16 years ago St. John's University
- Type: Honor
- Affiliation: Independent
- Status: Active
- Emphasis: Protective security disciplines
- Scope: International
- Motto: Ex scientia pax "Out of knowledge comes peace"
- Pillars: Excellence, Knowledge, Ethics, and Peace
- Colors: Blue and Gold
- Chapters: 100+
- Other name: Omicron Sigma Sigma
- Headquarters: P.O. Box 972; Coram, New York 11727; United States
- Website: www.securityhonorsociety.org

The Order of the Sword & Shield National Honor Society (OSSNHS or ΟΣΣ) is an international honor society for undergraduate students, graduate students, and professionals in the fields of homeland security, intelligence, emergency management, and all protective security disciplines.

== History ==
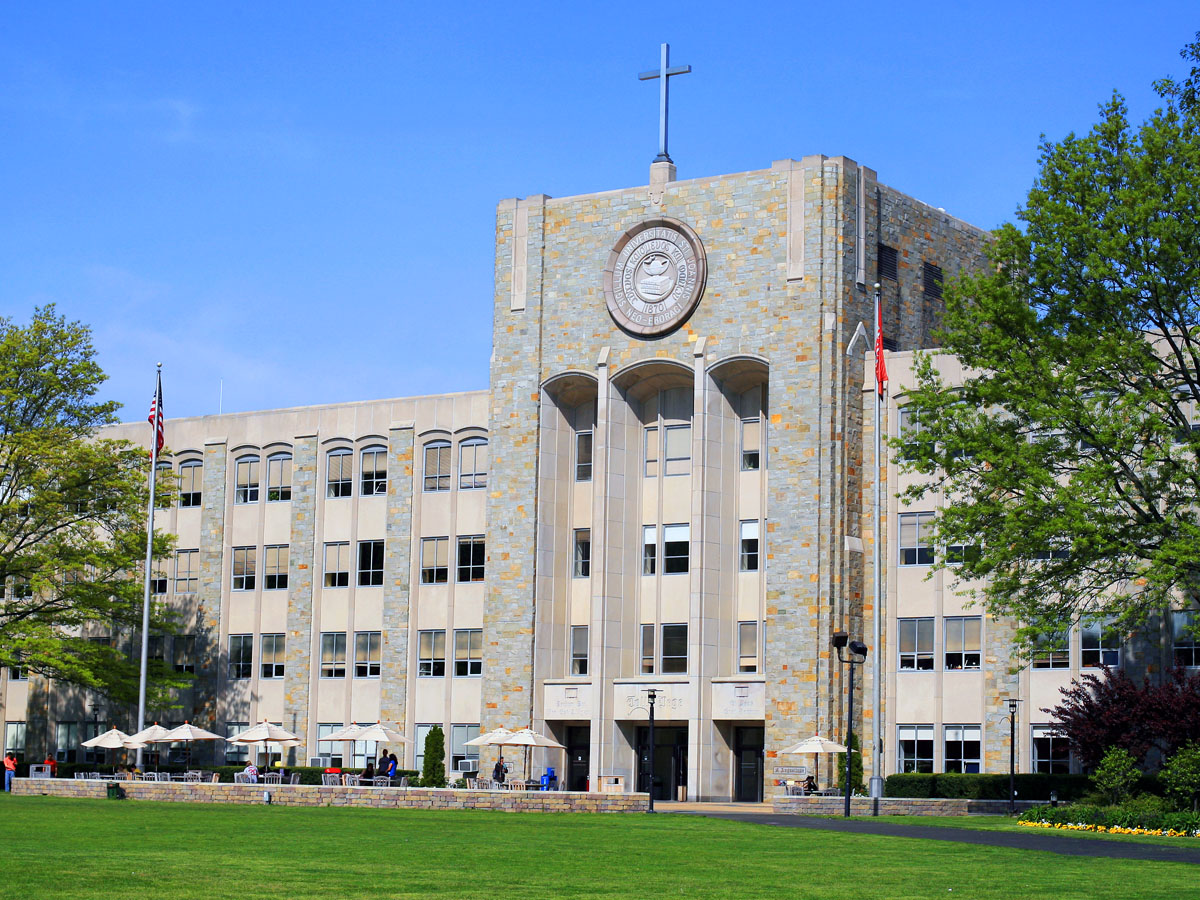
The Order of the Sword & Shield National Honor Society was founded at St. John's University.

The Order of the Sword & Shield was established in 2010 at St. Johns University by Professor Jeffrey Grossmann. The organization was created to be the first national honor society dedicated exclusively to homeland security, intelligence, emergency management and all protective security disciplines. Grossman serves as its executive director. Its headquarters are in Coram, New York. It has chartered more than 100 collegiate chapters.

== Symbols ==
The National Honor Society is also known by its Greek designation Omicron Sigma Sigma (ΟΣΣ). Its colors are gold and blue. Its motto in Latin is Ex scientia pax which means "Out of knowledge comes peace". Its core values or pillars are excellence, knowledge, ethics, and peace.

== Membership ==
In order to qualify, undergraduate students must have a 3.25 overall grade point average or higher (on a 4.0 scale) and have completed 50 percent of their overall program if they are majoring in a field within the honor society's charter. For graduate students to qualify, they must have a 3.5 overall GPA or higher (on a 4.0 scale) and must also have completed over 50 percent of their program to apply for membership. In addition, a letter of recommendation and an unofficial transcript is required. Professionals who have demonstrated significant achievement in a homeland security, intelligence, emergency management, or security-related occupation may also apply. They must have five years of experience and submit a letter of recommendation and resume.

== Chapters ==
=== Collegiate chapters ===
Following is a list of the Order of the Sword collegiate chapters. Inactive institutions are indicated in italics.

Charter date and range	Institution	Location	Status	Ref.
2010	St. John's University	New York City, New York	Active	
2013	Adelphi University	Garden City, New York	Active	
2015	Angelo State University	San Angelo, Texas	Active	
November 2023	Pennsylvania State University	State College, Pennsylvania	Active	
	Anderson University	Anderson, South Carolina	Active	
	Albertus Magnus College	New Haven, Connecticut	Active	
	American Military University and American Public University	Charles Town, West Virginia	Active	(Note: This is an online college.)
	Augusta University	Augusta, Georgia	Active	
	Bellevue University	Bellevue, Nebraska	Active	
	Brevard College	Brevard, North Carolina	Active	
	Calhoun Community College	Tanner, Alabama	Active	
	California State Polytechnic University, Pomona	Pomona, California	Active	
	Campbell University	Buies Creek, North Carolina	Active	
	Coastal Carolina University	Conway, South Carolina	Active	
	Collin College	McKinney, Texas	Active	
	Columbia Southern University	Orange Beach, Alabama	Active	
xxxx ?–2020	Daniel Morgan Graduate School of National Security	Capitol Heights, Maryland	Inactive	(Note: School closed on July 31, 2020.)
	Davis Technical College	Kaysville, Utah	Active	
	DeSales University	Center Valley, Pennsylvania	Active	
	Dillard University	New Orleans, Louisiana	Active	
	Eastern Kentucky University	Richmond, Kentucky	Active	
	Elizabeth City State University	Elizabeth City, North Carolina	Active	
	Embry–Riddle Aeronautical University	Daytona Beach, Florida	Active	
	Emmanuel College	Boston, Massachusetts	Active	
	Fairleigh Dickinson University	Madison, New Jersey	Active	
	Fayetteville State University	Fayetteville, North Carolina	Active	
	Florida Southwestern State College	Fort Myers, Florida	Active	
	Franklin University	Columbus, Ohio	Active	
	Georgia Southern University	Statesboro, Georgia	Active	
	Grand Canyon University	Phoenix, Arizona	Active	
	Hilbert College	Hamburg, New York	Active	
	Immaculata University	East Whiteland Township, Pennsylvania	Active	
	Jefferson Community College	Watertown, New York	Active	
	Johns Hopkins University	Baltimore, Maryland	Active	
	Keiser University	Fort Lauderdale, Florida	Active	
	Kennesaw State University	Kennesaw, Georgia	Active	
	LeTourneau University	Longview, Texas	Active	
	Liberty University	Lynchburg, Virginia	Active	
	Long Island Business Institute	New York City, New York	Inactive	(Note: The institute closed on January 27, 2024.)
	Louisiana State University Shreveport	Shreveport, Louisiana	Active	
	MacMurray College	Jacksonville, Illinois	Inactive	(Note: The college closed in May 2020.)
	Marian University		Active	
	Marymount University	Arlington County, Virginia	Active	
	Marist College	Poughkeepsie, New York	Active	
	Medaille College	Buffalo, New York	Active	
	Mercyhurst College	Erie, Pennsylvania	Active	
	Millersville University of Pennsylvania	Millersville, Pennsylvania	Active	
	Mitchell College	New London, Connecticut	Active	
	Monmouth University	West Long Branch, New Jersey	Active	
	National University		Active	
	National American University	Rapid City, South Dakota	Active	
	New Jersey City University	Jersey City, New Jersey	Active	
	Northeastern University	Boston, Massachusetts	Active	
	Northeastern State University	Tahlequah, Oklahoma	Active	
	Notre Dame College	South Euclid, Ohio	Active	
	Oakland City University	Oakland City, Indiana	Active	
	Oklahoma Christian University	Oklahoma City, Oklahoma	Active	
	Pacific Union College	Angwin, California	Active	
	Palm Beach State College	Lake Worth Beach, Florida	Active	
	Paul D. Camp Community College	Franklin, Virginia	Active	
	Point Park University	Pittsburgh, Pennsylvania	Active	
	Purdue University	West Lafayette, Indiana	Active	
	Purdue University Global		Active	
	Rabdan Academy	Abu Dhabi, United Arab Emirates	Active	
	Robert Morris University	Moon Township, Pennsylvania	Active	
	Saint Leo University	St. Leo, Florida	Active	
	Saint Louis University	St. Louis, Missouri	Active	
	Sam Houston State University	Huntsville, Texas	Active	
	San Diego State University	San Diego, California	Active	
	Sheridan College	Ontario, Canada	Active	
	Slippery Rock University	Slippery Rock, Pennsylvania	Active	
	Southeast Missouri State University	Cape Girardeau, Missouri	Active	
	Stevens Institute of Technology	Hoboken, New Jersey	Active	
	State University of New York at Albany	Albany, New York	Active	
	State University of New York at Canton	Canton, New York	Active	
	State University of New York at Farmingdale	East Farmingdale, New York	Active	
	State University of New York at Potsdam	Potsdam, New York	Active	
	Tiffin University	Tiffin, Ohio	Active	
	The Citadel	Charleston, South Carolina	Active	
	Thomas Edison State University	Trenton, New Jersey	Active	
	Thomas Jefferson University	Philadelphia, Pennsylvania	Active	
	Cooley Law School	Lansing, Michigan	Active	
	Tidewater Community College	Virginia	Active	
	Towson University	Towson, Maryland	Active	
	Tulane University	New Orleans, Louisiana	Active	
	University of Alabama at Birmingham	Birmingham, Alabama	Active	
	University of Alaska Fairbanks	College, Alaska	Active	
	University of Central Arkansas	Conway, Arkansas	Active	
	University of Central Florida	Orlando, Florida	Active	
	University of Detroit Mercy	Detroit, Michigan	Active	
	University of Findlay	Findlay, Ohio	Active	
	University of Lynchburg	Lynchburg, Virginia	Active	
	University of Maryland, College Park	College Park, Maryland	Active	
	University of Mississippi	University, Mississippi	Active	
	University of New Hampshire	Durham, New Hampshire	Active	
	University of Phoenix	Phoenix, Arizona	Active	
	University of South Florida	Tampa, Florida	Active	
	University of Texas at El Paso	El Paso, Texas	Active	
	University of the District of Columbia	Washington, D.C.	Active	
	Vincennes University	Vincennes, Indiana	Active	
	Walden University	Minneapolis, Minnesota	Active	
	Waldorf University	Forest City, Iowa	Active	
	Coalinga College	Coalinga, California	Active	(Note: Chapter formed at West Hills College Coalinga, now called Coalinga College.)
	Western Governors University	Millcreek, Utah	Active	
	Westminster College	Fulton, Missouri	Active	
	York College of Pennsylvania	Spring Garden Township, Pennsylvania	Active	

=== High school chapters ===
Chapter	Charter date	Institution	Location	Status	Location
HS Alpha	2021	Bob Jones High School	Madison, Alabama	Active	
		James Clemens High School	Madison, Alabama	Active	

=== Professional chapters ===
Institution	Location	Status	Location
Disaster Recovery Institute International (DRI)	Dearborn, Michigan	Active	
International Society for Preparedness, Resilience, and Security		Active	
Loss Prevention Foundation (LPF)	Mooresville, North Carolina	Active	
