= Sigma Tau Sigma =

American honor society for textiles

- ΣΤΣ
- Founded: 1929; 97 years ago North Carolina State University
- Type: Honor
- Affiliation: Independent
- Status: Active
- Emphasis: Textiles
- Scope: Local
- Colors: Blue and White
- Chapters: 1
- Headquarters: Raleigh, North Carolina; United States

Sigma Tau Sigma (ΣΤΣ) is a local honorary fraternity for textiles. It was established in 1929 at North Carolina State University in Raleigh, North Carolina.

== History ==
Sigma Tau Sigma is a local honorary fraternity for textiles. It was established in 1929 at the College of Textiles of North Carolina State University in Raleigh, North Carolina. Its purpose is establish high academic standards for textile students and to develop connections between textile students and those in the profession.

The fraternity went coed in October 1940 with the initiation of the first female member, June Dickson. By 1959, it had initiated several hundred members.

Annually, the fraternity presents the Sigma Tau Sigma Award to the textile senior with the highest academic standing.

== Symbols ==
The Greek letters Sigma Tau Sigma were selected to stand for Society for Textile Scholarship. The fraternity's colors are blue and white.

== Membership ==
Sigma Tau Sigma has active (student), alumni, and honorary members. To be eligible for membership, textile students must have at least a 3.25 grade point average after a semester in the College of Textiles. Honorary members include faculty, distinguished alumni, and notable professional in textiles and related fields.

== See also ==
- Professional fraternities and sororities
