= Theta Alpha Kappa =

American college honor society

- ΘΑΚ
- Founded: September 1976; 49 years ago Manhattan College
- Type: Honor
- Affiliation: ACHS
- Status: Active
- Emphasis: Religious Studies and Theology
- Scope: National
- Colors: Red and Gold
- Publication: Journal of Theta Alpha Kappa
- Chapters: 350 chartered
- Members: 19,500+ lifetime
- Headquarters: Bronx, New York; United States
- Website: thetaalphakappa.org

Theta Alpha Kappa (ΘΑΚ) is an American honor society for religious studies and theology. It was established in 1976 at Manhattan College in the Bronx, New York City, New York. It is a member of the Association of College Honor Societies.

== History ==
In 1976, Professor Albert Clark founded Theta Alpha Kappa at Manhattan College to recognize the academic achievements in religion and theology of undergraduate students, graduate students, and scholars. In February 1976, ten institutions connected with the College Theology Society adopted a constitution for Theta Alpha Kappa national honor society.

Later that year, the new society chartered fifteen chapters. Like its founding institution, Manhattan College, most of its early chapters were chartered at Roman Catholic colleges and universities. However, Theta Alpha Kappa does not have a religious affiliation.

The society was incorporated in the State of New York in 1983 and received its nonprofit status from the IRS in 1999. It became an association member of the Association of College Honor Societies in 1985 and a full member in 1986. It became a member society of the American Academy of Religion in 1994 and an affiliate organization of the Society of Biblical Literature in 2020.

In 2012, the society had 284 active chapters, 1,313 active members, and 19,448 total initiates. The Manhattan College chapter serves as its national headquarters and also stores its archives.

== Symbols ==
The society's Greek letter name, ΘΑΚ, represents Theos (God), Anthropos (Person), and Koinonia (Society). Theta Alpha Kappa's colors are red and gold.

== Membership ==
Potential members are nominated by the chapter at their institution. To be eligible for membership, undergraduates must have completed twelve hours of religious studies and/or theology classes with a 3.5-grade point average. In addition, they must rank in the top 35 percent of their class, with an overall 3.0 GPA. To become a member, graduate students must have a 3.5-grade point average after completing at least half of the requirement for their degree.

== Activities ==
Theta Alpha Kappa sponsors scholarship awards and fellowship competitions; including an undergraduate achievement award and a graduate fellowship award. Its Clark Albert Award recognizes the best undergraduate and graduate papers.

Theta Alpha Kappa publishes the Journal of Theta Alpha Kappa, which publishes student papers and offers an annual prizes.

== Chapters ==
As of 2025, Theta Alpha Kappa has chartered 369 chapters.

== See also ==
- Honor society
