= Lambda Epsilon Chi =

American honor society for paralegal students

- ΛΕΧ
- Founded: 1996; 30 years ago Altamonte Springs, Florida, US
- Type: Honor
- Affiliation: American Association for Paralegal Education
- Status: Active
- Emphasis: Paralegal
- Scope: National
- Colors: Royal Purple
- Symbol: Scales of Justice
- Chapters: 150+
- Members: 2,200 lifetime
- Headquarters: 8 The Green #17020; Dover, Delaware 19901; United States
- Website: www.aafpe.org/lex

Lambda Epsilon Chi (ΛΕΧ) is an American academic honor society for paralegal students. It was established by the American Association for Paralegal Education in 1996. It has more than 150 chapters in the United States.

== History ==
The American Association for Paralegal Education (AAfPE) formed Lamba Epsilon Chi in 1996. Lambda Epsilon Chi is an honor society that recognizes the academic achievement of paralegal and legal studies students.

The society hold local, regional, and national conferences and helps its members network with legal professionals. Lambda Epsilon Chi also has a national scholarship program for its members.

The society has chartered more than 150 chapters in the United States. It has initiated more than 2,200 members. Lambda Epsilon Chi is administered by the American Association for Paralegal Education. Its national headquarters are in Dover, Delaware.

== Symbols ==
The Greek letters Lambda Epsilon Chi were selected to correspond with the Latin word lex, which means “pertaining to the law” or “legal.” Initiates into Lambda Epsilon Chi receives a pin. The pin features the society's national symbol, the scales of justice, the Greek letters ΛΕΧ, and the name Lambda Epsilon Chi. The scales are a symbol of law, order, and truth.

The society's color is purple. Royal purple is the color of the English King's Court and indicates the law. In traditional academic regalia, paralegal faculty wear hoods rimmed in royal purple. Lambda Epsilon Chi members may wear purple cords at graduation.

== Membership ==
Candidates for membership in Lambda Epsilon Chi must have completed at least half of their paralegal coursework with a grade point average (GPA) of 3.25 overall, including a minimum GPA of 3.50 in paralegal courses. The society also initiates a limited number of honorary members.

== Chapters ==
Following is an incomplete list of Lambda Epsilon Chi chapters, in alphabetical order.

Institution	Charter date	Location	Status	Ref.
American National University		Kentucky, Tennessee, and Virginia	Active	
Auburn University at Montgomery		Montgomery, Alabama	Active	
Bay Path College	2001	Longmeadow, Massachusetts		
Berkeley College		New York City, New York and New Jersey	Active	
Central Carolina Technical College	2003	Sumter, South Carolina		
College of the Canyons		Santa Clarita, California	Active	
Del Mar College		Corpus Christi, Texas	Active	
Delaware Technical Community College			Active	
Eastern Kentucky University		Richmond, Kentucky		
Elms College		Chicopee, Massachusetts		
Florida SouthWestern State College		Fort Myers, Florida	Active	
Fullerton College		Fullerton, California	Active	
George Washington University		Washington, D.C.	Active	
Harper College		Palatine, Illinois	Active	
Hartford Community College	2006	Bel Air, Maryland	Active	
Hilbert College	January 1997	Hamburg, New York		
Husson University	2006	Bangor, Maine	Active	
Kellogg Community College	2012	Battle Creek, Michigan	Active	
Lehigh Carbon Community College		Schnecksville, Pennsylvania	Active	
Molloy University		Rockville Centre, New York	Active	
Montgomery College		Montgomery County, Maryland	Active	
Nova Southeastern University		Fort Lauderdale and Davie, Florida	Active	
Quinnipiac University		Hamden, Connecticut		
Robert Morris College		Chicago, Illinois	Inactive	(Note: College merged into Roosevelt University in 2020.)
Rowan College	2015	Sewall, New Jersey		
St. John's University		Grymes Hill, Staten Island, New York		
Santa Ana College		Santa Ana, California	Active	
State College of Florida, Manatee–Sarasota		Manatee County and Sarasota County, Florida		
Suffolk University		Boston, Massachusetts	Active	
Texas Wesleyan University		Fort Worth, Texas	Active	
Tulane University School of Professional Advancement		New Orleans, Louisiana	Active	
University of Hartford		West Hartford, Connecticut	Active	
University of Maryland Global Campus		Adelphi, Maryland	Active	
Virginia Intermont College	2000	Bristol, Virginia	Inactive	(Note: The college closed in 2014.)
William Rainey Harper College		Palatine, Illinois		

== See also ==
- Honor cords
- Professional fraternities and sororities
