= Herbert R. Temple Jr. =

United States Army general (1928–2024)

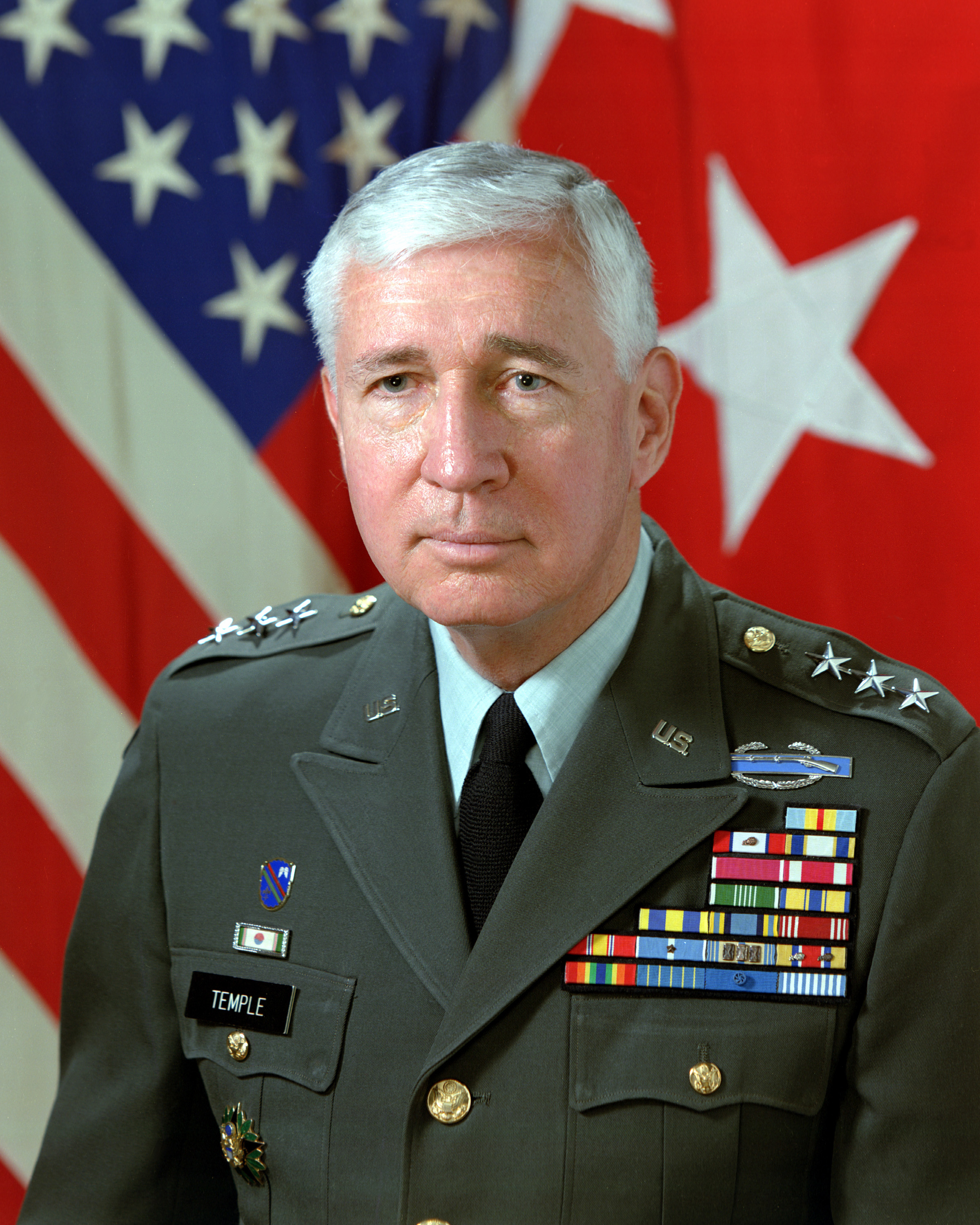
- Temple as Chief of the National Guard Bureau in 1990
- Born: Herbert Ralph Temple Jr. February 28, 1928; Los Angeles, California, U.S.
- Died: December 28, 2024 (aged 96); Palm Desert, California, U.S.
- Military career
- Allegiance: United States of America
- Branch: United States Army
- Service years: 1947–1990
- Rank: Lieutenant General
- Units: California National Guard; National Guard Bureau
- Commands: Company A, 160th Infantry Regiment; Company C, 160th Infantry; Headquarters and Headquarters Company (HHC), Combat Command A, 40th Armored Division; HHC, 40th Armored Division; 40th Supply and Transportation Battalion; 3rd Battalion, 160th Infantry; California Military Academy; 3rd Brigade, 40th Infantry Division; Chief, Office of Mobilization Readiness, NGB; Chief, Office of Policy and Congressional Liaison, NGB; Director, Army National Guard; Chief of the National Guard Bureau
- Conflicts: Korean War
- Awards: Defense Distinguished Service Medal; Distinguished Service Medal (U.S. Army); Air Force Distinguished Service Medal; Legion of Merit; Meritorious Service Medal; Army Commendation Medal; Air Force Commendation Medal
- Other work: Vice president and partner, trucking company Director, California Office of Emergency Services

Lieutenant General Herbert Ralph Temple Jr. (February 28, 1928 – December 28, 2024) was an American military officer who served as Chief of the National Guard Bureau.

== Early life ==
Herbert Ralph Temple Jr. was born in Los Angeles, California, on February 28, 1928. He graduated from Polytechnic High School in 1947 and enlisted as a private in the 160th Infantry Regiment, 40th Infantry Division.

== Korean War ==
In September 1950, he deployed for the Korean War, serving as a sergeant in Company B, 5th Regimental Combat Team, 24th Infantry Division. Temple earned the Combat Infantryman Badge during the war.

== Post Korean War ==
Temple returned to California in 1952 and received a direct commission as a second lieutenant in the 160th Infantry Regiment. Temple continued his college education and entered private business, becoming vice president and a partner in V.B. Morgan Petroleum and Chemical Trucking Company of Long Beach.

In 1954, Temple received an Associate of Arts degree in marketing from Los Angeles City College.

Temple became qualified in Armor in 1955, and commanded Headquarters and Headquarters Company, Combat Command A, 40th Infantry Division. He then joined the staff of the 40th Infantry Division, including assignments as Assistant Deputy Chief of Staff for Personnel and Deputy Chief of Staff for Personnel, G1.

In 1966, Temple graduated from the United States Army Command and General Staff College. The same year he was assigned to the 40th Division Support Command as Personnel Staff Officer, S1. He then commanded the 40th Supply and Transportation Battalion, followed by command of 3rd Battalion, 160th Infantry.

== Later military career ==
In July 1968, Temple was assigned to California National Guard headquarters, where he served as operations and training officer, followed by command of the California Military Academy. Along with those assignments, he also served as Military Assistant to Governor Ronald Reagan.

From 1971 to 1974, Temple was Deputy Commander of the 49th Infantry Brigade and then Commander of 3rd Brigade, 40th Infantry Division. During this period, he was also appointed by Governor Reagan to serve as Director of the California Office of Emergency Services.

In 1974, he received a Bachelor of Science degree in management from Golden Gate University. In 1975, he completed the United States Army War College, and also graduated from Shippensburg State University with a Master of Science degree in public administration.

== National Guard Bureau ==
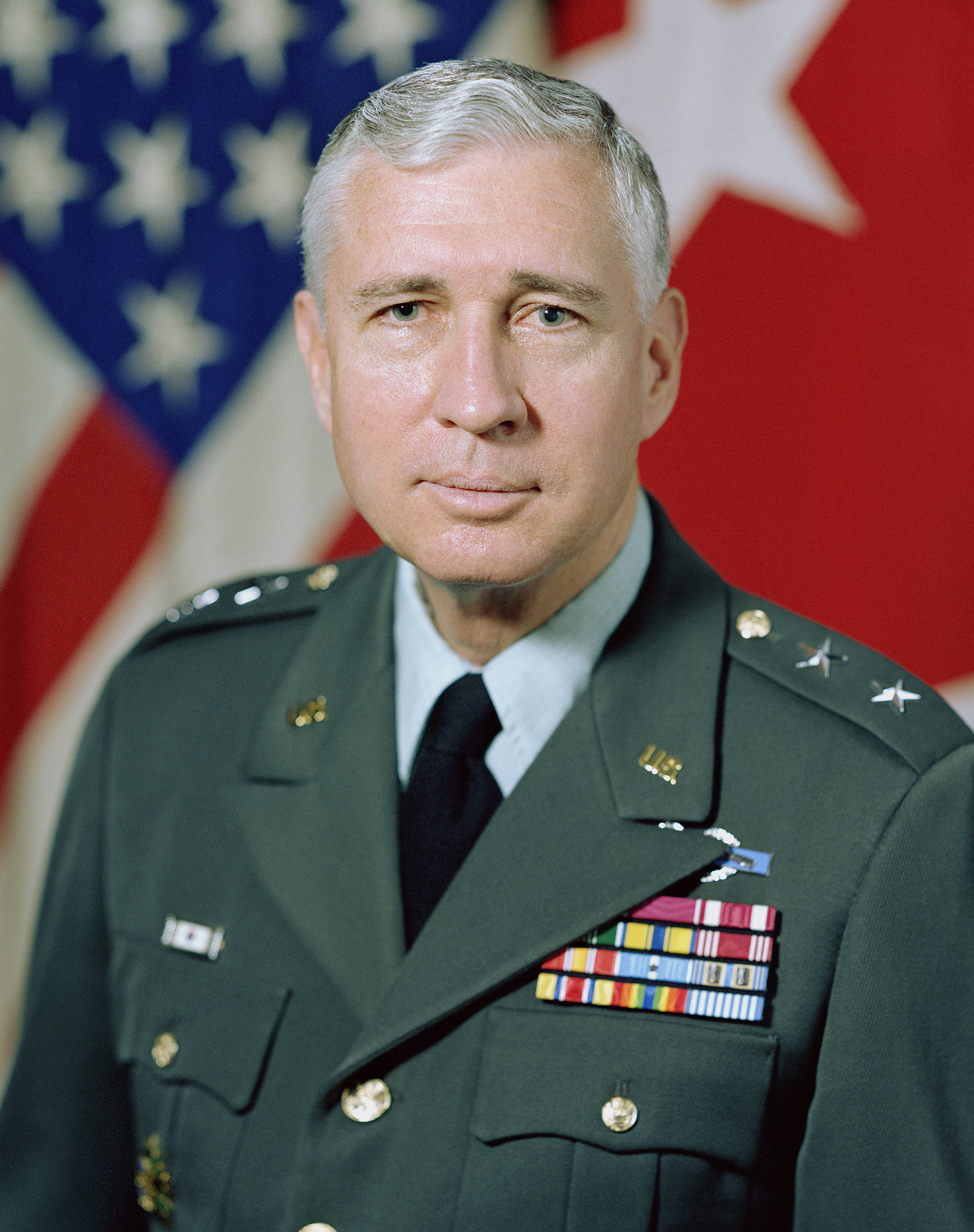
Temple as Director of the Army National Guard in 1983.

In September 1975, Temple was assigned to the National Guard Bureau as Chief of the Office of Mobilization and Readiness. After completing this assignment, he served as Chief of the Office of Policy and Congressional Liaison.

In 1978, he was appointed Deputy Director of the Army National Guard and promoted to brigadier general. He was succeeded by Richard D. Dean.

Temple became Director of the Army National Guard in 1982, and was promoted to major general. He was succeeded by Donald Burdick.

In 1986, General Temple was named Chief of the National Guard Bureau and promoted to lieutenant general. He served until retiring in 1990.

== Retirement ==
After retiring from the military, Temple was a defense consultant for government and private business, and led congressional directed studies related to civil-military planning for defense from weapons of mass destruction. He also served on Secretary of Defense study groups on Quality of Life in the Armed Forces and Readiness of the Armed Forces.

Temple moved to Palm Desert, California and became active in local affairs. He was past president of Lincoln Club of the Coachella Valley and past president of the World Affairs Council of the Desert. He was also appointed to serve on the Riverside County Veterans Committee.

== Civic and professional memberships ==
Temple was a member of the National Guard Association of the United States, National Guard Association of California, Association of the United States Army, Fifth Regimental Combat Team Association and Marines Memorial Association. He was a senior member of the Los Angeles Athletic Club and a member of Al Malaikah Shrine. Temple also served as Chief of Staff for the Military Order of the World Wars.

== Personal life and death ==
Temple married Patricia Ann Riley on July 30, 1949. They had met while in college, and she worked at Metro-Goldwyn-Mayer Studios and as personal secretary for Rod Serling. They had no children. Riley died in Rancho Mirage, California, on April 22, 2014.

Temple died on December 28, 2024, at the age of 96. He is buried at Desert Memorial Park.

== Legacy ==
The conference facility at the Camp San Luis Obispo officers' club is named the Herbert R. Temple Center.

Fort Leavenworth's Mission Training Complex includes the Herbert R. Temple, Jr. Leadership Training Center.

Camp Joseph T. Robinson, Arkansas is the home of the Herbert R. Temple, Jr. Marksmanship Training Center.

The Herbert R. Temple, Jr. Papers are part of the collections of the U.S. Army Heritage and Education Center.

In April 2014 the armory in Moreno Valley, California was named the Lt. Gen. Herbert R. Temple, Jr. Army National Guard Readiness Center.

In February 2017 the Army National Guard named its Arlington Hall Station headquarters the Herbert R. Temple, Jr. Army National Guard Readiness Center.

== Awards ==
General Temple's awards and decorations include: Defense Distinguished Service Medal; Army Distinguished Service Medal (2); Air Force Distinguished Service Medal; Legion of Merit; Meritorious Service Medal; Army Commendation Medal; Air Force Commendation Medal; Combat Infantryman Badge; and Army Staff Identification Badge.

His foreign honors include: Swedish Home Guard Medal of Merit; French National Order of Merit; and Swedish Order of the Polar Star.

Military offices
Preceded by Emmett H. Walker Jr.	Chief of the National Guard Bureau; 1986–1990	Succeeded by John B. Conaway
