= Phi Sigma Chi (disambiguation) =

Phi Sigma Chi was an American secondary school fraternity.

Phi Sigma Chi may also refer to:

- Phi Sigma Chi Multicultural Fraternity, a college fraternity
- Phi Sigma Chi (honorary), a defunct women's commerce fraternity
- Phi Sigma Chi (sorority), a local sorority at Grove City College
- Phi Sigma Chi (Texas State), a defunct local fraternity at Texas State University
- Phi Sigma Chi (Tri-State), a defunct local fraternity at Tri-State College
