= Gamma Epsilon Pi =

Business honor society for women (1918–1933)

- ΓΕΠ
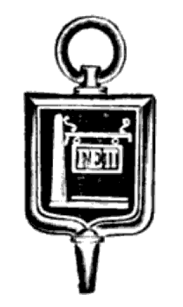
- Founded: March 26, 1918; 108 years ago University of Illinois
- Type: Honor
- Affiliation: Independent
- Status: Merged
- Merge date: April 29, 1933
- Successor: Beta Gamma Sigma
- Emphasis: Business
- Scope: National
- Colors: Coral and Gray
- Publication: The Signboard; The Post
- Chapters: 18
- Members: 983 lifetime
- Headquarters: United States

Gamma Epsilon Pi (ΓΕΠ) was an American business honor society for women. It was established in 1918 at the University of Illinois. Gamma Epsilon Pi consolidated with Alpha Gamma Pi and Phi Sigma Chi, two similar organizations, in 1922. In 1933, the society merged into Beta Gamma Sigma, previously an all-male society.

== History ==
Gamma Epsilon Pi was founded at the University of Illinois on March 26, 1918. It was an honor society for female business students. The founders were five junior women in the College of Commerce who felt that a similar organization to Beta Gamma Sigma was needed for women.

The society merged with Alpha Gamma Pi and Phi Sigma Chi in 1922. Alpha Gamma Pi was established at University of Wisconsin and Phi Sigma Chi was established at University of Washington at approximately the same time. The name and badge of Gamma Epsilon Pi were adopted for the merged group; a new constitution and ritual were created.

On April 29, 1933, the group merged into Beta Gamma Sigma, which began allowing female members in February 1932. The 983 members of Gamma Epsilon Pi became lifetime members of Beta Gamma Sigma.

== Symbols ==
The society's badge was in the shape of a key bearing the Greek letters ΓΕΠ. This pin exhibits a golden post and swinging signboard bearing the letters Γ, Ε, and Π, arrayed in the center of a gold key. In print this insignia may be set on a black shield.

The society's colors were coral and grey. Its publications were The Signboard and The Post.

== Membership ==
Active membership was limited to junior and senior women who ranked in the top fifteen percent of the women enrolled in the school's College of Commerce.

== Chapters ==
The chapters of Gamma Epsilon Pi include the follow; all chapters merged with Beta Gamma Sigma.

Chapter	Charter date and range	Institution	Location	Status	Ref.
Alpha	March 26, 1918 – April 29, 1933	University of Illinois	Champaign, Illinois	Merged (ΒΓΣ)	
Beta	November 22, 1919 – April 29, 1933	Northwestern University	Evanston, Illinois	Merged (ΒΓΣ)	
Gamma	1920 – April 29, 1933	University of California	Berkeley, California	Merged (ΒΓΣ)	
Delta	1920 – April 29, 1933	University of Pittsburgh	Pittsburgh, Pennsylvania	Merged (ΒΓΣ)	
Epsilon	1920 – April 29, 1933	University of Iowa	Iowa City, Iowa	Merged (ΒΓΣ)	
Zeta	March 4, 1921 – April 29, 1933	University of Kansas	Lawrence, Kansas	Merged (ΒΓΣ)	
Eta	April 23, 1921 – April 29, 1933	University of Minnesota	Minneapolis, Minnesota	Merged (ΒΓΣ)	
Theta	1922 – April 29, 1933	University of Oklahoma	Norman, Oklahoma	Merged (ΒΓΣ)	
Iota	1922 – April 29, 1933	Washington University	St. Louis County, Missouri	Merged (ΒΓΣ)	
Kappa	1922 – April 29, 1933	University of Southern California	Los Angeles, California	Merged (ΒΓΣ)	
Lambda	1922 – April 29, 1933	University of Montana	Missoula, Montana	Merged (ΒΓΣ)	
Alpha Beta	1922 – April 29, 1933	University of Washington	Seattle, Washington	Merged (ΒΓΣ)	(Note: This chapter originated as the Alpha chapter of Phi Sigma Chi in 1919, and joined Gamma Epsilon Pi as part of a national merger.)
Alpha Gamma	1922 – April 29, 1933	University of Wisconsin	Madison, Wisconsin	Merged (ΒΓΣ)	(Note: This chapter originated as Alpha Gamma Pi (local) approximately in 1918, likely soon after the formation of Alpha chapter of ΓΕΠ. At the consolidation of the sorority in 1922 it was given its off-cycle chapter name, to indicate it was one of the originators of the sorority.)
Alpha Delta	1922 – April 29, 1933	University of Texas	Austin, Texas	Merged (ΒΓΣ)	(Note: This chapter originated as the Beta chapter of Phi Sigma Chi in 1919, and joined Gamma Epsilon Pi as part of a national merger.)
Alpha Epsilon	1922 – April 29, 1933	Syracuse University	Syracuse, New York	Merged (ΒΓΣ)	(Note: As indicated by its off-cycle name, this chapter may have been considered another of the founding chapters of ΓΕΠ, but it was not specifically noted as such in Baird's records.)
Alpha Zeta	1922 – April 29, 1933	New York University	New York City, New York	Merged (ΒΓΣ)	(Note: As indicated by its off-cycle name, this chapter may have been considered another of the founding chapters of ΓΕΠ, but it was not specifically noted as such in Baird's records.)
Mu	1924 – April 29, 1933	University of Nebraska	Lincoln, Nebraska	Merged (ΒΓΣ)	
Nu	1926 – April 29, 1933	Ohio State University	Columbus, Ohio	Merged (ΒΓΣ)	
