= W.R. Mead =

W.R. Mead may refer to:

- Walter Russell Mead (1952 – ), an American academic
- William Rutherford Mead (1846 – 1928), an American architect
