= Grand Inter-Fraternity Council =

American umbrella group for high school clubs

- Founded: 1909; 116 years ago Schenectady, New York, US
- Type: Umbrella
- Affiliation: independent
- Status: Defunct
- Emphasis: Secondary school fraternities
- Scope: National
- Headquarters: United States

The Grand Inter-Fraternity Council of the United States was an umbrella organization for high school fraternities. It was established in 1909 in Schenectady, New York, in part to counter anti-fraternity sentiment. At its height, the organization had a membership of fifty fraternities. The council ceased operations around 1920 when move states passed legislation banning high school fraternities.

== History ==
The Grand Inter-Fraternity Council of the United States held an organizational meeting in Schenectady, New York in February 1909. Some of its founders were Alpha Zeta, Omega Eta Tau, Pi Phi, and Theta Phi. Its first president was Earl A. Bates of Detroit, Michigan, and Richard E. Yates of Schenectady was its secretary and treasurer.

The council was established to maintain a high standard among the high school fraternities of the United States. Its founders also wanted to eliminate outside criticism of secondary school fraternities by removing or changing the objectionable aspects of the fraternities. There was a high anti-fraternity sentiment in the United States at the time. At its first meeting, the council established regulations for member organizations to adopt.

The council held its second meeting in Detroit in May 1910 and included representatives from roughly half of the national high school fraternities at the time. The council held its second national meeting in Detroit on May 27, 1910.

In June 1910, council members participated in negotiations with the Rochester, New York School Board, which was considering banning high school fraternities. Although the fraternities involved presented and signed an agreement to the school board, they were unsuccessful in swaying the board, which banned five fraternities and five sororities on December 19, 1910. On behalf of the council, Yates told the press that arrangements were being made to continue the fraternities despite the board's ruling.

The council sent a communication to the National Education Association in July 1910, urging the association to create a council to investigate and help improve high school fraternities In 1911, the council was involved in lobbying the Brooklyn school board and the New York legislature to stop a bill that would have made high school fraternities illegal in New York City. They succeeded in getting the Board of Education and the High School Committee to schedule a public hearing on March 27, 2011.

Phi Sigma Chi joined the council in February 1911, which at that time consisted of thirty member organizations. In 1912, the council represented 475 fraternity chapters, consisting of 136,800 members. On February 1, 1912, Bates announced a new policy that forbade smoking by fraternity members who were under the age of eighteen. This policy was adopted in agreement with the National Education Association and came with a penalty of suspending the offending chapter for ten days or expulsion of the fraternity from the council.

At its June 1912 convention, held in Rochester, New York, the council decided to rebrand "high school fraternities" as "school fraternities". At this meeting Bates was made an "honorary president" after he declined reelection, having served as the council's president for three years. The council's 1913 convention in New York City included eighteen fraternities, representing 1,000 chapters.

By 1915, the council included fraternities in 34 states, representing 480 chapters. On July 7, 1915, the council held its annual meeting in the Festival Hall of the Panama-Pacific International Exposition in San Francisco. However, because high school fraternities continued to be controversial, most were forbidden by state law by 1920, bringing an end to the Grand Inter-Fraternity Council.

== Member organizations ==
Following is an incomplete list of the fraternities that belonged to the Grand Inter-Fraternity Council.

- Alpha Zeta
- Beta Phi Sigma
- Kappa Alpha Phi
- Mu Delta Sigma
- Omega Eta Tau
- Phi Sigma Chi
- Pi Phi
- Sigma Lambda Nu
- Theta Phi

== See also ==
- High school fraternities and sororities
- High school secret societies
