= Kappa Alpha Pi =

Kappa Alpha Pi may refer to:

- Kappa Alpha Pi (secondary), a high school fraternity
- Kappa Alpha Pi (pre-law), a pre-law professional fraternity
