= High school fraternities and sororities =

American secondary student organizations

High school fraternities and sororities, also called secondary fraternities and sororities, were inspired by and modeled after Greek-letter organizations which became prevalent in North American colleges and universities during the nineteenth century. Omega Eta Tau, formed in 1859 as Torch and Dagger in Council Bluffs, Iowa, is the first known high school fraternity. It was followed by Gamma Sigma, Alpha Zeta, Alpha Phi, Sigma Psi, Alpha Chi Sigma, Pi Phi, Gamma Delta Psi, Eta Kappa, and more.

The establishment of other fraternities was fairly slow, gaining momentum between 1890 and 1900 as older organizations added chapters and new Greek letter organizations were established. Most high school fraternities were located at schools in and near New York City and Chicago, with San Francisco being a third location. San Francisco's Girls' High School had seven sororities by 1905.

Although hundreds of local high school fraternities and sororities with only one or two chapters were founded in the late nineteenth and early twentieth centuries, many secondary fraternities founded during that time grew into legitimately national organizations with ten or more chapters in multiple states and with highly evolved national governing structures.

During the early 20th century, many fraternities that formed in the Eastern United States established chapters on the Pacific Coast. In this era, President William Rainey Harper of the University of Chicago contacted the 464 largest secondary schools in the United States; 120 of the 306 reporting schools had one to six fraternities and many also had a sorority. With this growth came a growing pushback against such “secret societies" in high schools, with critics labeling the groups as exclusionary and divisive, and their practices criticized as “obnoxious”.

Some state and local governments banned fraternities and sororities in public schools. The states of Indiana, Kansas, and Minnesota, and the city of Madison, Wisconsin, adopted regulations in 1907. Ohio passed an anti-fraternity law in 1908, as did the school board in St. Joseph, Missouri, and Worcester, Massachusetts. California, Iowa, Nebraska, Oregon, Vermont, and Washington passed laws against secret societies in 1909. In 1909, school boards in Kansas City, Missouri; Lowell, Massachusetts; and Oklahoma City, Oklahoma all approved prohibitory regulations, followed by Chicago; Denver; New Orleans; Butte, Montana; Meriden, Connecticut; and Racine, Wisconsin in 1910. Michigan passed an anti-fraternity law in 1911, followed by Mississippi in 1912. More school boards, including those in Covington, Kentucky; Milwaukee, Wisconsin; Reading, Pennsylvania; Superior, Wisconsin; and Waltham, Massachusetts, passed regulations in 1911. As a result of these regulations, many Greek letter organizations ceased to exist and were replaced by local clubs; at some schools, fraternities went underground or changed to community-based organizations. This favored the survival of smaller or local organizations over the larger national fraternities that continued to operate in the open.

In response to the anti-fraternity sentiment and policies, the Grand Inter-Fraternity Council was formed in February 1909. Its purpose was "to promote the usefulness of preparatory and high school fraternities; to place before the public the objects of these organizations and create a body by which all grievances between fraternities, school and civil officials can be fairly terminated." Its founding members were organizations that were at least ten years old and had more than five chapters. In 1910, the council included 25 fraternities that represented 31,455 members. By 1912, 46 fraternities had joined the council. Its counterpart for sororities was the Junior Pan-Hellenic Congress.

In December 1927, Gamma Sigma was the first high school fraternity to establish a chapter outside of the United States and the first international high school fraternity, establishing its Alpha Zeta chapter in Niagara Falls, Ontario, Canada. Theta Kappa Sigma sorority was established at Stamford Collegiate Institute in Niagara Falls, Ontario in 1932. By 1969, there were forty high school fraternities and sororities in the United States and Canada.

The following is an incomplete list of secondary and high school fraternities and sororities.

== Social fraternities ==
In the following of high school social fraternities, active groups are indicated in bold and inactive groups are in italics.

Organization	Symbols	Founding date and range	Founding institution	Founding location	Status	Ref.
Alpha Chi Sigma	ΑΧΣ	1876	Peekskill Military Academy	Peeksill, New York	Inactive	
Alpha Delta Sigma	ΑΔΣ	January 19, 1891		Bridgeport, Connecticut	Inactive	
Alpha Iota Epsilon	ΑΙΕ	1890	Erasmus Hall High School	Brooklyn, New York	Inactive	
Alpha Omega	ΑΩ	1897		Detroit, Michigan	Inactive	
Alpha Phi	ΑΦ	1876	Colgate Academy	Hamilton, New York	Inactive	(Note: Was formed as a local literary society in 1870.)
Alpha Tau Omicron	ΑΤΟ	c. 1885	Ann Arbor High School	Ann Arbor, Michigan	Inactive	
**Alpha Zeta**	ΑΖ	December 8, 1869	Union Classical Institute	Schenectady, New York	Active	(Note: The fraternity was originally organized Alpha Beta Debating Club, a literary and debating society at Union Classical Institute, later known as Schenectady High School. It did not add a second chapter until seventeen years later.)
**ATOPHI (Alpha Tau Omega Phi)**	ΑΤΩΦ	November 2, 1988	West Philadelphia High School	Philadelphia, Pennsylvania	Active	
Beta Phi Sigma	ΒΦΣ	September 8, 1899	Muncie High School	Muncie, Indiana	Inactive	
Beta Pi	ΒΠ	1907	Polytechnic Preparatory Institute	Brooklyn, New York	Inactive	
Beta Zeta Phi	ΒΖΦ	December 1897	Lake View High School	Chicago, Illinois	Inactive	
Chi Sigma Chi	ΧΣΧ	January 26, 1890	New York Military Academy	Cornwall-on-Hudson, New York	Inactive	(Note: At its peak, the fraternity included over thirty chapters. Its chapters were based at military academies across the U.S.)
Delta Gamma Phi	ΔΓΦ	xxxx ?–1984	Hamden High School	Hamden, Massachusetts	Inactive	(Note: The fraternity went inactive after a hazing incident led to assault charges.)
Delta Gamma Psi	ΔΓΨ	before 1896		Michigan ?	Inactive	
Delta Omicron Omicron	ΔΟΟ	November 8, 1897		Kansas City, Missouri	Inactive	
Delta Sigma	ΔΣ	1897–198x ?	Lewis Institute	Chicago, Illinois	Inactive	(Note: Originally begun as an athletic fraternity, its focus became purely social as it expanded throughout the United States. By the 1980s, most chapters of the fraternity had become inactive.) (Note: The Lewis Institute was formed as a high school and became a college in 1922.)
Delta Sigma Nu	ΔΣΝ	May 13, 1893	Ann Arbor High School	Ann Arbor, Michigan	Inactive	(Note: The School Board passed policies prohibiting fraternities in March 1895.)
Delta Sigma Upsilon	ΔΣΥ	1900		Chicago, Illinois	Inactive	
Delta Theta	ΔΘ	1896	Polytechnic Preparatory Institute	Brooklyn, New York	Inactive	(Note: The fraternity chartered chapters at high schools and technical colleges throughout the mid-Atlantic states, the upper Midwest, and as far away as California.)
**DeMolay International**		March 29, 1919		Kansas City, Kansas	Active	
Eta Beta Pi	ΗΒΠ	October 26, 1908 – November 1912	Wichita High School	Wichita, Kansas	Merged	(Note: Merged into Pi Delta Koppa.)
Eta Kappa	ΗΚ				Inactive	
Eta Kappa Phi	ΗΚΦ	before 1898			Inactive	(Note: In 1898, it had chapters in Ann Arbor, Michigan; Cleveland, Ohio; Columbus, Ohio; and Milwaukee, Wisconsin.)
Gamma Alpha	ΓΑ	1914	Baton Rouge High School	Baton Rouge, Louisiana	Inactive	
Gamma Beta Phi	ΓΒΦ		Williston Seminary	Easthampton, Massachusetts	Inactive	
Gamma Delta Psi	ΓΔΨ	April 13, 1879 – c. 1995; 2008	James Hillhouse High School	New Haven, Connecticut	Inactive	(Note: The fraternity was defunct by 1995. It was revived in 2008.)
Gamma Eta Chi	ΓΗΧ	before May 1886			Inactive	(Note: Gamma Eta Chi, or Good English Club, chartered chapters at high schools and junior colleges.)
Gamma Eta Kappa	ΓΗΚ	March 10, 1882	Boy's High School	San Francisco, California	Inactive	(Note: Formed as a literary society at Boys High School, now the Lowell High School.)
**Gamma Sigma**	ΓΣ	October 11, 1869	Brockport State Normal School	Brockport, New York	Active	(Note: This is reported to be the first international high school fraternity, with the chartering of the Alpha Zeta chapter in Niagara Falls, Ontario, Canada, on December 11, 1927.)
Kappa Alpha Phi	ΚΑΦ	1898	Muncie High School	Muncie, Indiana	Inactive	
Kappa Alpha Pi	ΚΑΠ	1898–196x ?	Englewood High School	Chicago, Illinois	Inactive	
Kappa Phi	ΚΦ	October 10, 1901		Saginaw, Michigan	Inactive	
Lambda Sigma	ΛΣ	October 12, 1892	Detroit High School	Detroit, Michigan	Inactive	
Lambda Sigma	ΛΣ	October 12, 1892	Detroit School for Boys	Detroit, Michigan	Inactive	
Mu Delta Sigma	ΜΔΣ	November 1884	Grand Rapids High School	Grand Rapids, Michigan	Inactive	
Omega Delta	ΩΔ	c. 1950–196x ?	La Salle Senior High School	Niagara Falls, New York	Inactive	
**Omega Eta Tau**	ΩΗΤ	1859–1861, 1866–1880, 1893	Council Bluffs High School	Council Bluffs, Iowa	Active	(Note: Formed as Torch and Dagger. It was renamed Omega Eta Tau in 1900 when it began expanding nationally.)
**Omega Gamma Delta**	ΩΓΔ	1902		Brooklyn, New York	Active	(Note: In the 2010s, it was recast as "a fraternity for men" with a focus on citywide alumni and graduate clubs.)
Omega Nu	ΩΝ			California	Inactive	
Omicron Kappa Pi	ΟΚΠ	November 1893	Chicago Academy	Chicago, Illinois	Inactive	(Note: Formed at the Chicago Academy, later known as the Lewis Institute.)
Phi Alpha Sigma	ΦΑΣ				Inactive	
Phi Chi	ΦΧ	November 25, 1902	Polytechnic High School	San Francisco, California	Inactive	
Phi Delta	ΦΔ	1891–1921		Illinois	Inactive	(Note: The fraternity voted to discontinue its connection with high schools in 1921, the first high school fraternity in the US to do so. It continued to operate as an alumni association with more than 4,000 members.)
Phi Delta Sigma	ΦΔΣ	April 14, 1900		Utica, New York	Inactive	
**Phi Kappa**	ΦΚ	1918		Troy, Alabama	Active	
Phi Kappa Epsilon	ΦΚΕ	January 1909 – May 1910		Alameda, California	Merged	(Note: This two-chapter fraternity based in Alameda and Oakland, California, merged with the Kappa Alpha Pi national fraternity in 1920.)
Phi Lambda Epsilon	ΦΛΕ	February 12, 1892	Clinton Academy	Clinton, Missouri	Inactive	(Note: Expanded to normal schools and is still active as a collegiate educational fraternity.)
Phi Sigma	ΦΣ	March 22, 1895	Grand Rapids High School	Grand Rapids, Michigan	Inactive	
Phi Sigma Chi	ΦΣΧ	November 28, 1900	Zanesville High School	Zanesville, Ohio	Inactive	
Pi Delta Koppa	ΠΔϘ	1876	Michigan Military Academy	Orchard Lake Village, Michigan	Inactive	
Pi Phi	ΠΦ	1878–198x ?	Rochester Free Academy	Rochester, New York	Inactive	(Note: Pi Phi spread to more than 110 chapters before lapsing into solely alumni chapters in the 1980s.)
Sigma Delta Phi	ΣΔΦ	December 5, 1902	Polytechnic Preparatory Institute	Brooklyn, New York	Inactive	
Sigma Delta Psi	ΣΔΨ	1902	Polytechnic Preparatory Institute	Brooklyn, New York	Inactive	
Sigma Kappa Delta	ΣΚΔ	1906		Hudson, New York	Inactive	
Sigma Lambda Nu	ΣΛΝ	1882	Brooklyn Central High School	Brooklyn, New York	Inactive	
Sigma Phi Alpha	ΣΦΑ	before 1907	Erasmus Hall High School	Brooklyn, New York	Inactive	
Sigma Phi Omega	ΣΦΩ	1901	Sewanee Grammar School	Sewanee, Tennessee	Inactive	(Note: At least thirty chapters of the fraternity were founded in other states throughout the Southern United States.)
Sigma Phi Upsilon	ΣΦΥ	October 1899		Brooklyn, New York	Inactive	
Sigma Psi	ΣΨ	1878	St. Paul's School	Garden City, New York	Inactive	
Sigma Psi	ΣΨ	c. 1950–196x ?	La Salle Senior High School	Niagara Falls, New York	Inactive	
Sigma Sigma	ΣΣ	before 1895 – March 1895	High School	Ann Arbor, Michigan ?	Inactive	
Sigma Upsilon	ΣΥ	November 25, 1905	Portland High School	Portland, Maine	Inactive	
Tau Delta Tau	ΤΔΤ	1917	Sewanee Military Academy	Sewanee, Tennessee	Inactive	
Tau Kappa Delta	ΤΚΔ	1925	Pottsville High School	Pottsville, Pennsylvania	Active	
Theta Chi	ΘΧ	January 16, 1893	Oakland High School	Oakland, California	Inactive	
Theta Kappa Omega	ΘΚΩ	November 13, 1872 – 196x ?	California Military Academy	Mayfield, California	Inactive	
Theta Phi	ΘΦ	1885	Utica Free Academy	Utica, New York	Inactive	
Triangle Fraternity			Downey High School	Downey, California	Inactive	
Upsilon Lambda Phi	ΥΛΦ	1901	Burlington High School	Burlington, Vermont	Inactive	
Upsilon Lambda Phi	ΥΛΦ		Newark High School	Newark, New Jersey	Inactive	
Upsilon Zeta Pi	ΥΖΠ				Inactive	
Xi Beta Gamma	ΞΒΓ				Inactive	

== Social sororities and girl's fraternities ==
In the following of high school social sororities and girl's fraternities, active groups are indicated in bold and inactive groups are in italics.

Organization	Symbols	Founding date and range	Founding institution	Founding location	Status	Ref.
Alpha Alpha	ΑΑ		Bridgeport High School	Bridgeport, Connecticut	Inactive	
Alpha Sigma	ΑΣ	March 15, 1894		Oakland, California	Inactive	
**Beta Delta**	ΒΔ	1926		Shreveport, Louisiana	Active	
**Delta Beta Sigma**	ΔΒΣ	October 1, 1903	Columbia Female Institute	Columbia, Tennessee	Active	
Delta Chi	ΔΧ	c. 1950–196x ?	La Salle Senior High School	Niagara Falls, New York	Inactive	
Delta Gamma	ΔΓ	1890		Utica, New York	Inactive	
Delta Iota Chi	ΔΙΧ	February 28, 1894	San José High School	San Jose, California	Inactive	
Delta Kappa Phi	ΔΚΦ	xxxx ?–c. 1913	Evanston Township High School	Evanston, Illinois	Inactive	
Eta Kappa Phi	ΗΚΦ	1906	Rock Island High School	Rock Island, Illinois	Inactive	
Eta Phi	ΗΦ		Albany Normal School	Albany, New York	Inactive	
**Gamma Theta**	ΓΘ	1931	Baton Rouge High School	Baton Rouge, Louisiana	Active	
**International Order of the Rainbow for Girls**		1922			Active	
Iota Beta Phi	ΙΒΦ				Inactive	
Kappa Phi	ΚΦ			Connecticut or Massachusetts	Inactive	
Lambda Theta Phi	ΛΘΦ	1894	Oakland High School	Oakland, California	Inactive	
**Omega Nu**	ΩΝ	February 26, 1897	San José High School	San Jose, California	Active	
Phi Alpha Phi	ΦΑΦ	1894		New Haven, Connecticut	Inactive	
Phi Phi Phi	ΦΦΦ				Inactive	
Psi Gamma Psi	ΨΓΨ				Inactive	
Psi Iota Xi	ΨΙΞ	September 19, 1897	Muncie High School	Muncie, Indiana	Inactive	
Tau Alpha Psi	ΤΑΨ	1893	West Division High School	Chicago, Illinois	Inactive	
Theta Chi Omicron	ΘΧΟ	c. 1950–196x ?	La Salle Senior High School	Niagara Falls, New York	Inactive	
**Theta Kappa Sigma**	ΘΚΣ	1931	Stamford Collegiate Institute	Niagara Falls, Ontario, Canada	Active	
Theta Sigma	ΘΣ	June 1, 1887		Albany, New York	Inactive	
Theta Zeta Gamma	ΘΖΓ	1894	Oakland High School	Oakland, California	Inactive	
Xi Gamma Rho	ΞΓΡ	c. 1950–196x ?	La Salle Senior High School	Niagara Falls, New York	Inactive	
Zeta Beta Psi	ΖΒΨ	xxxx ?–c. 1913	Evanston Township High School	Evanston, Illinois	Inactive	

== Jewish fraternities ==
In the following of high school Jewish fraternities, active groups are indicated in bold and inactive groups are in italics.

Organization	Symbols	Founding date and range	Founding institution	Founding location	Status	Ref.
**Aleph Zadik Aleph**	אצא	1924		Omaha, Nebraska	Active	
Hai Resh		July 7, 1907– 1937		St. Joseph, Missouri	Merged	(Note: The fraternity declined when most of its leadership entered World War I. It continued but merged with Pi Tau Pi by 1937.)
Phi Beta	ΦΒ	1920			Inactive	(Note: Not to be confused with the professional fraternity for the creative and performing arts.)
Phi Sigma Beta	ΦΣΒ	June 22, 1910 – 1914	DeWitt Clinton High School	New York City, New York	Inactive	(Note: The fraternity was re-established as Tau Delta Phi collegiate organization in 1914.)
Pi Tau Pi						
Pi Upsilon Phi	ΠΥΦ				Inactive	(Note: Its Sigma chapter was at Syracuse.)
**Sigma Alpha Rho**	ΣΑΡ	November 18, 1917 – c. 2014; December 2022	West Philadelphia High School	West Philadelphia, Pennsylvania	Active	(Note: The fraternity formed from the Soathical Club. In December 2022, the fraternity was reactivated with a new chapter in Bucks County, Pennsylvania.)
Upsilon Lambda Phi	ΥΛΦ	April 5, 1916			Inactive	(Note: Voted to become nonsectarian in 1966.)

== Jewish sororities ==
In the following of high school Jewish sororities, active groups are indicated in bold and inactive groups are in italics.

Organization	Symbols	Founding date and range	Founding institution	Founding location	Status	Ref.
**B'nai B'rith Girls**	**בבג**	1944		San Francisco, California	Active	
Iota Gamma Phi	**ΙΓΦ**				Inactive	
Iota Phi	**ΙΦ**				Inactive	
Sigma Theta Pi	**ΣΘΠ**	c. 1909			Inactive	(Note: Not to be confused with the international sorority with a similar name, Sigma Thêta Pi, founded in 2003, nor the local Christian fraternity at Howard Payne University, founded in 2004.)
Sigma Omega Pi	**ΣΩΠ**	c. 1950–1970s		Norfolk, Virginia	Inactive	

== See also ==
- College fraternities and sororities
- High school club
- International Order of the Rainbow for Girls
