= Omega Gamma Delta =

American high school fraternity

- ΩΓΔ
- Founded: June 22, 1902; 124 years ago Brooklyn, New York
- Type: Social
- Affiliation: Independent
- Status: Active
- Emphasis: High school
- Scope: National
- Motto: "Always Remember. . . . . . Omega Gamma Delta"
- Member badge
- Tree: Oak
- Chapters: 100
- Members: 15,000+ lifetime
- Headquarters: New York; United States
- Website: omegagammadeltafraternity.com

Omega Gamma Delta (ΩΓΔ) is an American national high school fraternity founded in Brooklyn, New York in 1902. It is the oldest surviving high school fraternity in the United States. In the 2010s, it was recast as "a fraternity for men" with a focus on citywide alumni and graduate clubs.

== History ==
Omega Gamma Delta was founded on June 22, 1902, by Percy Edrop, Arthur Edrop, and Walter Dohm in Brooklyn, New York. Arthur Edrop had just finished his sophomore year at Boys High School in Brooklyn in the same class as his older brother, Percy. As a result, the Alpha chapter was based out of the Boys High School. Its mission was "to teach the meaning of brotherhood, good fellowship, and friendship, the strengthening of character, the necessity of clean living and respect to parents." The group was social in nature, hosting its second dance of the year in November 1902. It was different from other high school fraternities at the time because it worked with teachers and inducted the school's faculty in its membership.

In 1902, the Beta chapter was chartered in New Jersey, followed by the Gamma chapter in Brooklyn in 1903. In January 1903, the Alpha chapter hosted Beta and Gamma for a weekend that featured a reception, dinner, and dance. The fraternity held its first national convention in Brooklyn on May 15, 1903, where it elected officers and adopted a constitution and by-laws. Its badge and coat of arms were adopted at the second annual convention on June 29, 1904, along with chartering Delta chapter in New York City.

In October 1906, the fraternity conduct a special service at the Church of the Reconciliation in Brooklyn, conducted by alumnus Percy T. Eldrop. The service included specially arranged music and local choirs from across Brooklyn. The service included representatives from other high school fraternities and sororities. Omega Gamma Delta had representatives from its Alpha, Gamma, Delta, and Epsilon chapters. The fraternity also produced and performed plays, including Billy in 1914 and Stop Thief in 1915, both held at the Masonic Temple in Brooklyn. A father and son dinner was also one of the fraternity's annual events.

In 1915, the New York City Board of Education wanted to ban all high school fraternities, objecting to the Greek letter organizations' secretive, exclusive, and divisive nature. On February 12, 1915, the fraternity held its thirteenth annual convention where it decided to comply with the Board of Education's request by revoking and canceling the charters for those chapters. This impacted Alpha chapter at Boys' High School, Gamma chapter at Erasmus Hall High School, Delta chapter at Morris High School and Evander Childs High School, Epsilon chapter at the High School of Commerce and DeWitt Clinton High School, and Mu chapter at Manual Training High School. However, the chapters was not disbanded; instead their members "were advised, counseled, and directed to discard their badges and hereafter wear no sign, insignia, pin or badge of the order." These former members moved to a new organization, the Omega Club, that was "in no way actively connected with the Omega Gamma Delta fraternity" and was open for all students to join.

Omega Gamma Delta was incorporated in the State of New York on April 1, 1916. It grew steadily by adding chapters regionally, in New York state, New Jersey, and New England. Occasionally, more far-flung chapters were added in Michigan, Ohio, Puerto Rico, and Washington, D.C. In 1925, Omega Gamma Delta was criticized for its many social functions. The fraternity responded by passing a resolution saying that it would suspend any member found intoxicated at a fraternity social function. It maintained that the students who were guilty of drinking at past events were not its members.

New Jersey followed in banning high school fraternities. New York and New Jersey's policies forced many Omega Gamma Delta chapters to either go dormant or go underground. Nearly twenty years later in 1964, students at the Beta Gamma chapter at Oceanside High School in Oceanside, New York, were allowed to have a fraternity but the group was not recognized by the school and could not meet on campus. At that time, the New York State Education Department did not recognize high school fraternities.

One writer recalled that the high school fraternities in New Jersey in the later 1960s and early 1970s were "basically gangs who tortured and beat up each other"; this included Omega Gamma Delta which had a couple of incidents that were reported in The New York Times. By 1974, most school districts on Long Island banned high school fraternities because of the rivalries between groups, resulting in activities from stealing fraternity member's coats to beatings. For example, in 1973, the Gamma Theta chapter at Sachem High School was barred by school officials but was still meeting. At the time, The New York Times reported that Omega Gamma Delta was "sports-minded" but also known for its social and community activities.

After the 1960s and 1970s, Omega Gamma Delta declined from thirty to seven active chapters in 1992. In 2004, the fraternity only had four active chapters and less than 100 student members. On June 22, 2004, it rechartered the Alpha chapter.

After 2010, the fraternity made a push to establish post-high school and alumni chapters outside of New York. It founded chapters at the College of Central Florida in 2011 and Georgia State University and 2012, as well as alumni chapters in Daytona Beach, Florida and Dallas, Texas in 2014. That was followed by new graduate chapters in Nassau County, New York; Tampa Bay, Florida; and Northern New Jersey in 2015. By 2015, Omega Gamma Delta had initiated nearly 15,000 members.

In 2016, alumni chapters were chartered in Nassau County, New York and Palm Beach County, Florida. Two more graduate chapters were added in 2019, including Grapevine, Texas and Charlotte, North Carolina. Its newest chapter in Myrtle Beach, South Carolina, was chartered in 2021 and is also for graduate or alumni members.

== Symbols ==
Arthur Edrop designed the fraternity's first crest and pin. The fraternity's tree is the oak that is featured on its crest. Its motto is "Always Remember. . . . . . Omega Gamma Delta".

== Chapters ==
Omega Gamma Delta had chartered 115 chapters, although most are inactive.

== Scandals and misconduct ==
- Two members of the Theta III chapter at East Rockaway High School were arrested in 1960 for hazing after beating a pledge for fifteen minutes, resulting in his hospitalization for three days. Before the beating, the pledge had to shine 62 pairs of shoes, do fifty push-ups, and run 25 laps around a quarter mile track.
- In April 1964, ninth grader Michael Kalogris was hospitalized for three weeks after a Hell Night initiation ceremony for the Beta Gamma chapter of Oceanside High School. Despite being punched by fraternity members until he retched and passed out from internal bleeding, fourteen year old Kalogirs still wanted to join Omega Gamma Delta. After the incident, the parents of 21 fraternity members were called to appear before the Grand Jury. Four fraternity members, all minors, were indicted of hazing but were not found guilty.
- In November 1991, between 25 and 30 members of Omega Gamma Delta from the Sewanhaka High School district went to the North Valley Stream High School district and attacked five to ten students, including members of Alpha Sigma Phi, a local high school fraternity. The attackers carried bats and clubs. This attack was reported to be in retaliation for a prior incident where an Alpha Sigma Phi member spit on the girlfriend of an Omega Gamma Delta member'. When the assistant principal tried to break up the fight, he was punched in the face by one of the students. Five hours later, three students with clubs attacked a student wearing an Omega Gamma Delta sweatshirt. The police "likened the fraternities to youth gangs". Ten Omega Gamma Delta members were suspended from school and arrested for assault; at the time, Omega Gamma Delta chapter was operating illegally, against school system policies.
- In January 1992, a member of Alpha Sigma Phi was arrested for assaulting a pledge of Omega Gamma Delta with brass knuckles, fracturing his skull, and requiring brain surgery. Both students attended Carey High School where fraternities were illegal.
- In December 1994, four members of Alpha Omega Theta in Valley Stream, New York, were arrested after confronting their rivals, Omega Gamma Delta, at a local mall. Police took weapons from the youths, including a baseball bat, slugshot, and a tire iron. Police described the incident as "part of an ongoing fraternity feud", initiated in response to an attack by Omega Gamma Delta in the previous week.
- In 2003, hazing was reported by a pledge of Omega Gamma Delta at Street Academy High School in Brooklyn. The hazing involved paddling the pledge's bare buttocks and requiring him to rub an ornament that burned on his genitals.

== Notable members ==
=== Art and architecture ===
- Viggo F. E. Rambusch (Alpha) – architect and decorator with Rambusch Decorating Company
- James Kellum Smith (Towanda in Bradford County, Pennsylvania) – architect

=== Entertainment ===
- Fulvio Cecere (Beta) – Actor and filmmaker
- Kim Gannon (Iota) – songwriter and lyricist who co-wrote “I’ll Be Home For Christmas”
- Jerome Kern (Kappa) – composer of musical theatre
- Don Murray (Alpha Phi) – Academy Award nominated actor
- Hayden Rorke (Upsilon) – actor known for I Dream of Jeannie
- D. B. Sweeney (Beta Tau) – actor
- Lawrence Tierney (Alpha) – film and television actor
- George Walsh ( Boyd high school) – actor
- Raoul Walsh (Boyd high school ) – film director, actor, founding member of the Academy of Motion Picture Arts and Sciences

=== Journalism ===
- John Henshaw Crider (Rho) – Pulitzer Prize winning journalist and editor in chief of The Boston Herald
- Robert J. Donovan (Alpha Beta) – correspondent, author, and presidential historian

=== Law ===
- Kenneth Molloy (Mu) – judge on the New York State Supreme Court
- Arthur T. Vanderbilt (Kappa) – Chief Justice of the New Jersey Supreme Court

=== Military ===
- Garrison H. Davidson (Pi) – United States Army Major General
- Martin H. Foery (Alpha Zeta) – United States Army major general
- Emmett O'Donnell Jr. (Mu) – United States Air Force four-star general who served as Commander in Chief of the Pacific Air Forces
- Joseph May Swing (Kappa) – United States Army lieutenant general

=== Politics ===
- Alfonse M. D’Amato (Beta Gamma, honorary) – former United States Senator
- Charles A. Gargano (Mu) – U.S. Ambassador to Trinidad and Tobago and chairman of the Empire State Development Corporation

=== Science ===
- Oliver L. Austin (Rho) – Ornithologist

=== Sports ===
- Nick Bollettieri (Beta Lambda) – tennis coach
- Howard Cann (Kappa) – basketball coach at New York University and an Olympic shot putter
- Tedford H. Cann (Epsilon) – champion swimmer and a recipient of the Medal of Honor.
- Robert Cloughen (Delta) – member of the 1908 U.S. Olympic team
- Ned Irish (Gamma) – founder and owner of the New York Knicks
- Vince Lombardi (Alpha Pi Deuteron) – football coach
- Ernie Vandeweghe (Beta Gamma) – professional basketball player

== See also ==
- High school fraternities and sororities
