= Sigma Alpha Rho =

Jewish high school fraternity

- ΣΑΡ
- Founded: November 18, 1917; 108 years ago West Philadelphia, Pennsylvania
- Type: Social
- Affiliation: Inter-Fraternity Congress of America
- Status: Active
- Emphasis: High school, Jewish
- Scope: International (former)
- Motto: Una Spiritus Una Fides "One Spirit One Faith"
- Colors: Purple and White
- Symbol: Snake with a Gleaming Eye
- Publication: The Gleaming Eye
- Chapters: 1
- Nickname: S.A.R.
- Headquarters: , Pennsylvania; United States
- Website: sarfraternity.org

Sigma Alpha Rho (ΣΑΡ) is a North American Jewish high school fraternity. It was founded on November 18, 1917, in West Philadelphia, Pennsylvania. However, by 2017, all of its chapters had gone dormant, with only alumni members remaining. The SAR Alumni Association formed a reactivation committee and hired a marketing company to help rebrand the fraternity. In December 2022, the high school fraternity was reactivated with a new chapter in Bucks County, Pennsylvania.

== History ==
=== Founding ===
On November 18, 1917, eleven young men met in a synagogue on Larchwood Avenue in Philadelphia for a meeting of the Soathical Club. The Soathical Club was an organization that was established the previous spring by Jewish students from the West Philadelphia High School to get together socially. The name was derived from a combination of the words social and athletic, and among the activities was included a baseball team.

At the meeting, Bill Braude proposed that the club be converted into a fraternity, primarily to advance Jewish student interests at West Philadelphia High School. The result was Sigma Alpha Rho Fraternity. Jules Feinstein was elected president of the fraternity, Louis Marios was elected vice president, Nathan Goldman became secretary, Benjamin Landau assumed the role of treasurer, and Harry Katz took the position of financial secretary. The new fraternity entrusted member Alexander Meisel with the design of its pin. The members also selected the fraternity's colors.

In the spring of 1918, Sigma Alpha Rho held its first affair and recruited members, including Jerry Abramson and John Bthes who influenced the development of the fraternity. In the fall of 1918, Abramson was elected president. Under his leadership, the fraternity integrated into the activities of the West Philadelphia High School.

The fraternity decided to expand to other high schools and established its National Organizers Department, the precursor to the present-day Supreme Board of Chancellors. In anticipation of a second chapter, the group revamped and rewrote its rituals and rites.

=== 1921 to 1929 ===
On June 10, 1921. the Sigma chapter was inducted in the Roof Garden of the Lorraine Hotel in Philadelphia. It consisted of ten students from Central High School of Philadelphia. Sigma was considered the "Social Chapter" and adopted the motto, "Every active man active".

With the arrival of Sigma chapter, the West Philadelphia High School adopted the name Phi chapter. The older members of Phi were used to controlling the fraternity and were rebellious at being subordinated. Gradually, Phi adjusted to its new role as a fraternity chapter.

In September 1921, the fraternity formed an Executive Council with four members from Phi and four from Sigma. The council set up the plans to become a national organization with a constitution and by-laws. They selected Leon S. Rosenthal as the first Supreme Exalted Ruler (President).

Eventually, every high school in Philadelphia added a chapter of the fraternity. On October 17, 1921, the Theta chapter in South Philadelphia High School was inducted at the Lorraine Hotel as the third chapter of Sigma Alpha Rho. Concurrently with the negotiations for the induction of the Sigma chapter, a group in the South Philadelphia had been making plans to join the SAR.

On November 26, 1922, the first chapter outside of Philadelphia was inducted, the Iota chapter of Chester High School (Pennsylvania). For a time, Iota only admtted twelve new members each year to honor the twelve charter members. SAR became a national fraternity on October 12, 1923 with the addition of the Epsilon chapter of Camden High School in Camden, New Jersey. Chapters followed in Wilmington, Delaware, New York, New York, and Pittsburgh, Pennsylvania. However, with this expansion came the need for a central governing body to link the chapters.

In the beginning, the Executive Council possessed limited powers and few duties. However, with the addition of chapters outside of Philadelphia, it became necessary to form a governing council that would include their representation. On January 20, 1924, the Supreme Exalted Ruler dissolved the Executive Council and, then, called into session a new National Executive Council representing every chapter in the fraternity. Elections were held and Leon S. Rosenthal was again elected as Supreme Exalted Ruler. A new constitution was adopted as the new constitution of Sigma Alpha Rho. The fraternity also started publishing its newspaper, The Gleaming Eye.

In the conventions that subsequently followed as yearly events, meetings of the National Executive Council became increasingly complex. At the 1926 convention, the constitution was amended to create a new governing body, the Supreme Board of Chancellors, with greater power and resources. The group was to be elected annually by the National Executive Council (delegates from each chapter). On December 26, 1926, the first meetings of the Supreme Board of Chancellors were held at the Astor Hotel in New York City.

In the course of these meetings, several types of important legislation were effected. First, the Board created a new status of activity, that of life membership to be granted to all members of the newly formed Alumni Club. Second, it was during this period that Sigma Alpha Rho spread further with chapters in Jersey City (Zeta Omega), Overbrook (Zeta Iota), and Roxborough (Zeta Xi).

The following year, the fraternity suffered severe financial reversals, and every available source of income was used to liquidate the outstanding obligations. The hext year was hopeful with financial recovery, chapter consolidation, and conservative expansion. In 1928, an auditing committee was appointed to inspect the accounts of the fraternity. Furthermore, it became mandatory that the records of Sigma Alpha Rho be held open to all brothers at all times. Another rule passed this year provided that all chapters that failed to pay their per capita tax would be excluded from representation in the National Executive Council.

=== 1930 to 1949 ===
SAR brothers struggled through the Great Depression, but the fraternity survived. Between 1929 and 1938, the fraternity began the practice of a winter or midyear meeting of chapter presidents, published the first edition of its handbook, and introduced three district councils. As World War II began in 1939, many brothers left for war, stretching the fraternity's leadership. In 1943, the fraternity donated $3,100 ($57,678 in today's money) to purchase two ambulances to the U.S. Medical Corps. In 1945, SAR dedicated a war memorial in Fairmount Park in Philadelphia. In 1945, over thirty chapters were represented at the national convention that began three days after the armistice with Japan.

In 1946, SAR made many advances following over 800 brothers attending the convention that year. The first Royal Purple and White yearbook was published, a national scholarship fund was established and named after Irving Rathblott, the Eastern District Council emerged, and SAR joined the Inter-Fraternity Congress of America.

=== 1950 to 1999 ===
From 1950 to 1953, SAR emphasized community service, making large donations to The Polio Foundation and the National Society for Crippled Children. The Zeta Theta chapter assisted with construction of a new Jewish Community Center in Wilkes-Barre, Pennsylvania.

In the late 1950s, SAR adopted a fraternity flag, published its first pledge training manual, printed a Parents Guide, and produced a film about the fraternity's history. Also in this period, former Supreme Exalted Ruler (President) of SAR, Howard L. Feldman, was elected president of theInter-Fraternity Congress of America. In 1958, Sigma Alpha Rho had fifty active chapters. The fraternity became international with the chartering of chapters in Montreal and Toronto.

=== 1999 to 2015 ===
Communications changed from the monthly mailed SER letter to the SAR website, mass email, and social media.

=== Present ===
By its 100th anniversary in 2017, all chapters of Sigma Alpha Rho had gone dormant, and only alumni remained. The alumni association formed a reactivation committee and hired a marketing company to help rebrand the fraternity. In December 2022, a new chapter was formed in Bucks County, Pennsylvania with twelve high school members.

== Symbols and traditions ==
The fraternity's pin or badge was designed by member Alexander Meisel and featured the fraternity's symbol, The Gleaming Eye. Its colors are royal purple and white. Sigma Alpha Rho's motto is Una Spiritus Una Fides or "One Spirit One Faith".

The fraternity's newspaper was The Gleaming Eye and was first published in 1924. Its first handbook was published in 1937. It also had a yearbook called The Royal Purple & White and a roster book, the Nelson T. Hoffman Memorial Blue Book. Other publications were produced for specific occasions such as The Order: Sigma Alpha Rho 2002–2007, which was published for the 90th anniversary alumni reunion on May 20, 2007.

== Activities ==
SAR holds semi-annual conventions when the entire organization spends a weekend together and for social events and legislative business. The Midyear is held in winter, and the Summer Convention is held sometime in the summer. Training events included leadership seminars and retreats.

== Membership ==
Membership is open to Jewish males of high school or spring of eight grade who are approved by the individual chapter. Potential members are contacted by a brother or can contact a brother or attend a meeting for those interested in joining the fraternity. Sigma Alpha Rho's pledging process is designed to prepare the pledges to be completely active and equal members of the chapter. SAR emphasizes a no hazing policy; pledges attend meetings and can participate in fraternity-wide events. Pledges must complete a specific task before induction, such as planning and executing an event, preparing a pledge newspaper, or organizing informal sports with their chapter.

Girls can attend all events, including the Midyear and Summer Conventions, or can start sister girls groups. Girl groups are organized as part of the Tau Epsilon Chi (TEX), Eta Pi, or Zeta Gamma Phi sororities.

== Governance ==
=== Local ===
A chapter is a group of brothers organized by geographical area. Chapters form the basis for all SAR activity. Chapters have names of one or two Greek letters based on their charter date. The brothers in each chapter elect officers, organize events, and hold regular meetings. Chapter officers include Sigma Rho (President), Mu Rho (Vice-President), Kappa Mu (Treasurer), and Kappa Beta (Secretary). Chapters may elect or have their Sigma Rho appointed. A brother known as the Rho chairman is appointed to run pledge classes.

=== National ===
The Supreme Board of Chancellors or SBC is the overarching governing body of SAR at all times other than midyear or summer convention. During the fraternity-wide conventions, the International Executive Council (IEC) serves as the highest body while in session. The SBC is elected by the brothers at the IEC meeting at each summer convention.

The Supreme Exalted Ruler or SER is the president of Sigma Alpha Rho fraternity. The current alumni association president is Jason Eric Saylor of the Zeta Xi chapter.

=== Districts ===
When the Supreme Exalted Ruler dissolved the Executive Council and replaced it with a new National Executive Council in 1924, it became necessary to organize a local body that would combine the numerous chapters in and around Philadelphia. For this reason, the Executive Council of Philadelphia District or Philadelphia District Council was established, with much the same makeup as the Executive Council, which had recently been dissolved.

Similarly, the Metropolitan District Council was formed for the chapters in New York City, Brooklyn, Jersey City, and Newark, New Jersey. In 1925, the Western Pennsylvania District Council was organized by the Tau chapter and the newly created Zeta Phi chapter. Other district councils include the Mid-Southern District Council (Inaugurated in 1935 to represent Baltimore-Washington Metropolitan Area), the Southern District Council (Inaugurated 1938), the Central Pennsylvania District Council (Inaugurated in 1939), the Eastern District Council (Inaugurated in 1946 representing chapters in the southern parts of New Jersey), the Long Island District Council (Inaugurated 1958–1959), the Los Angeles District Council (Inaugurated 1960–1961), the Queens District Council (Inaugurated 1961), the Quebec Canadian District Council (Inaugurated 1966), the Boston District Council (Inaugurated 1966), and the Toronto District Council.

== Chapters ==
=== Naming conventions ===
Chapters from first to eleventh had a specific name pattern based on charter order and the Greek alphabet. Using the "f" sound from the word "first", the first chapter was named Phi. The "s" sound in 'second' was used to select the name Sigma for the second chapter. The 'th' sound in 'third' was used to name the Theta chapters. When it came time to name the fourth chapter, since the "f" sound for Phi had already been used, the second letter from "fourth" or '"o" was used to select the Omega chapter. For the fifth chapter, the second letter of the word "fifth" or "i" was the basis for naming the Iota chapter. Since "s" and 'i' had previously been used, the sixth chapter was named for the third letter "x", resulting in the Xi chapter. For the seventh chapter, "s" was already used, so the second letter "e" of "seventh" was used to name Epsilon. The eighth chapter was named Eta chapter because "eighth" sounded similar to the Greek letter Eta. The ninth chapter became Nu, and the tenth became Tau. The eleventh chapter was named Lambda because "e" had previously been used, so the second letter of "eleventh" or "l" was used instead.

=== Chapters ===
Following is a list of Sigma Alpha Rho chapters. Inactive chapters and institutions are in italics. Active chapters are indicated in bold.

Chapter	Charter date and range	Institution	City	State or province	Status	Ref.
Phi (First)	November 18, 1917	West Philadelphia High School	Philadelphia	Pennsylvania	Moved	(Note: Formed by members of the Soathical Club (local), established in the spring of 1917.)
Phi (Second)		Lower Moreland High School	Philadelphia	Pennsylvania	Moved	
Phi (Third)			Greater Northeast Philadelphia and Huntingdon Valley	Pennsylvania	Inactive	
Sigma	June 10, 1921	Central High School of Philadelphia	2nd and Cheltenham Philadelphia	Pennsylvania	Inactive	
Theta (First)	October 17, 1921	South Philadelphia High School	South Philadelphia	Pennsylvania	Moved	
Theta (Second)			Center City, Philadelphia, and Richboro	Pennsylvania	Inactive	
Omega	January 8, 1922	Northeast High School, Central High School, and Washington High School	Northeast Philadelphia	Pennsylvania	Inactive	
Iota (First)	November 26, 1922	Chester High School	Chester, Pennsylvania	Pennsylvania	Moved	
Iota (Second)			Northeast Philadelphia and Yardley	Pennsylvania	Inactive	
Xi (First)	November 26, 1922	Germantown High School	Philadelphia	Pennsylvania	Moved	
Xi (Second)			Southampton	Pennsylvania	Inactive	
Epsilon (First)	October 12, 1923	Camden High School	Camden	New Jersey	Moved	
Epsilon (Second)			Cherry Hill	New Jersey	Inactive	
Eta (First)	October 12, 1923	Frankford High School	Philadelphia	Pennsylvania	Moved	
Eta (Second)			Cheltenham and Rydal	Pennsylvania	Inactive	
Nu (See Nu Beta)	November 30, 1923 – 1925	Newark High School	Newark	New Jersey	Consolidated	
Tau	December 26, 1923		Pittsburgh	Pennsylvania	Inactive	
Lambda	February 10, 1924		Wilmington	Delaware	Inactive	
Zeta	February 22, 1924		Binghamton	New York	Inactive	
Rho	April 2, 1924		Allentown	Pennsylvania	Inactive	
Upsilon	April 13, 1924		Brooklyn	New York	Inactive	(Note: When the chapter was chartered, it covered Greater New York City.)
Mu (see Mu Kappa)	May 2, 1924 – 19xx ?		New York City	New York	Consolidated	(Note: Mu, Beta, Zeta Epsilon consolidated into Mu Beta chapter.)
Kappa (see Mu Kappa)	May 2, 1924 – 19xx ?		New York City	New York	Consolidated	
Beta (See Nu Beta)	October 17, 1924 – 1925			New Jersey	Consolidated	
Gamma	November 12, 1924		Harrisburg	Pennsylvania	Inactive	
Omicron	November 26, 1924		Brooklyn	New York	Inactive	
Nu Beta	1925		Newark and Livingston	New Jersey	Inactive	(Note: The chapter formed from the merger of Nu and Beta chapters. In November 1928, it absorbed the Theta Beta Rho fraternity.)
Zeta Phi	April 30, 1925	Allegheny High School	Pittsburgh	Pennsylvania	Inactive	
Delta	May 5, 1925		Scranton	Pennsylvania	Inactive	
Zeta Sigma	May 10, 1925		Reading	Pennsylvania	Inactive	
Zeta Theta	May 10, 1925		Kingston	Pennsylvania	Inactive	
Zeta Omega	September 26, 1926		Jersey City	New Jersey	Inactive	
Zeta Omega	October 17, 1926		Paramus	New Jersey	Inactive	(Note: Chapter was originally chartered in Jersey City, New Jersey.)
Zeta Iota (First)	November 28, 1926	Overbrook High School	Philadelphia	Pennsylvania	Moved	
Zeta Iota (Second)	November 28, 1926		Overbrook, Plymouth Meeting, and Norristown	Pennsylvania	Inactive	
Zeta Xi (First)	March 7, 1927	Roxborough High School	Roxborough, Philadelphia	Pennsylvania	Moved	
Zeta Xi (Second)			Northeast Philadelphia	Pennsylvania	Inactive	
Zeta Epsilon	November 1927		Metropolitan New York	New York	Inactive	
Zeta Eta	November 8, 1927		Brooklyn	New York	Inactive	
Zeta Nu	November 8, 1927		Passaic and South Brunswick	New Jersey	Inactive	
Beta Zeta (see Mu Kappa)	November 8, 1927 – 19xx ?		New York City	New York	Consolidated	
Mu Kappa			Bronx	New York	Inactive	
Zeta Tau (First)	March 25, 1928	Simon Gratz High School	Philadelphia	Pennsylvania	Moved	
Zeta Tau (Second)			Northeast Philadelphia and Blue Bell	Pennsylvania	Inactive	
Zeta Lambda	December 4, 1928		McKeesport	Pennsylvania	Inactive	
Theta Sigma	January 17, 1929		Buffalo	New York	Inactive	
Theta Theta	December 29, 1929		New Orleans	Louisiana	Inactive	
Theta Omega	November 1, 1931		Easton	Pennsylvania	Inactive	
Theta Iota	November 25, 1932		Washington	D.C.	Inactive	
Theta Xi	June 25, 1933		San Antonio	Texas	Inactive	
Theta Epsilon	March 31, 1935		Baltimore	Maryland	Inactive	
Theta Eta	April 21, 1935		Houston	Texas	Inactive	
Theta Nu	June 23, 1935		Elmira	New York	Inactive	
Theta Tau	March 13, 1938		Passaic and East Windsor	New Jersey	Inactive	
Theta Lambda	April 24, 1938		Atlantic City	New Jersey	Inactive	
Tau Phi	November 21, 1938		Norfolk	Virginia	Inactive	
Tau Sigma	February 12, 1939		Elizabeth	New Jersey	Inactive	
Tau Theta	April 7, 1940		Baltimore	Maryland	Inactive	
Tau Omega	May 26, 1940		Orange	New Jersey	Inactive	
Tau Xi	January 15, 1942		Northeast Philadelphia and Lafayette Hill	Pennsylvania	Inactive	
Tau Delta	February 22, 1942		Richmond	Virginia	Inactive	
Upsilon Kappa	June 7, 1942		Laurelton	New York	Inactive	
Tau Epsilon	February 21, 1943		Havertown	Pennsylvania	Inactive	
Alpha Xi	January 21, 1945		Bala Cynwyd	Pennsylvania	Inactive	
Alpha Sigma	March 25, 1945		Jamaica	New York	Inactive	
Alpha	April 1, 1945		Chicago	Illinois	Inactive	
Alpha Theta	April 7, 1946		Forest Hills	New York	Inactive	
Alpha Kappa	November 30, 1947		Staten Island	New York	Inactive	
Alpha Iota	April 10, 1949		Brooklyn	New York	Inactive	
Chi	April 10, 1949		Miami	Florida	Inactive	
Beta Tau	April 18, 1949		Cherry Hill and Voorhees	New Jersey	Inactive	
Alpha Omega	November 5, 1950		Teaneck and Moorestown	New Jersey	Inactive	
Alpha Pi	October 21, 1951		Queens Village	New York	Inactive	
Delta Omega	March 29, 1953		Broomall	Pennsylvania	Inactive	
Delta Phi	January 24, 1954		Lancaster	Pennsylvania	Inactive	
Delta Sigma	June 27, 1954		Bayside	New York	Inactive	
Theta Kappa	October 17, 1954		Rochester	New York	Inactive	
Delta Theta	January 9, 1955		Levittown	Pennsylvania	Inactive	
Delta Xi	December 9, 1956		East Meadow	New York	Inactive	
Delta Iota	June 10, 1957		Irvington and Princeton	New Jersey	Inactive	
Delta Epsilon	December 22, 1957		West Hempstead	New York	Inactive	
Delta Eta	May 4, 1958		Trenton and West Windsor	New Jersey	Inactive	
Delta Nu	November 14, 1958		Huntingdon Valley	Pennsylvania	Inactive	
Delta Tau	December 5, 1958		Woodmere	New York	Inactive	
Delta Lambda	February 1, 1959		Winthrop	Massachusetts	Inactive	
Delta Rho	March 21, 1959		Chattanooga	Tennessee	Inactive	
Delta Kappa	April 3, 1959		Asbury Park	New Jersey	Inactive	
Delta Gamma	June 29, 1959		Brooklyn	New York	Inactive	
Delta Omicron	June 29, 1959		Baldwin	New York	Inactive	
Gamma Phi	January 31, 1960		Port Washington	New York	Inactive	
Gamma Sigma	June 30, 1960		West Hollywood	California	Inactive	
Gamma Theta	June 30, 1960		Van Nuys	California	Inactive	
Gamma Omega	January 20, 1961		Bayside	New York	Inactive	
Gamma Xi	January 22, 1961		Upper Dublin	Pennsylvania	Inactive	
Gamma Iota	May 6, 1961		North Hollywood	California	Inactive	
Gamma Epsilon	May 6, 1961		North Hollywood	California	Inactive	
Gamma Eta	December 23, 1961		Hackensack	New Jersey	Inactive	
Gamma Nu	January 28, 1962		Newton Center	Massachusetts	Inactive	
Gamma Tau	December 20, 1962		LeFrak City	New York	Inactive	
Gamma Lambda	December 11, 1963		Montreal	Quebec	Inactive	
Gamma Rho	May 20, 1964		Roslyn Heights	New York	Inactive	
Rho Phi	November 15, 1964		Montreal	Quebec	Inactive	
Rho Sigma	December 13, 1964		Merrick	New York	Inactive	
Rho Theta	December 13, 1964		Maspeth	New York	Inactive	
Rho Omega	January 24, 1965		Northeast Philadelphia and Richboro	Pennsylvania	Inactive	
Rho Xi	February 14, 1965		Plainview	New York	Inactive	
Rho Epsilon	March 21, 1965		Côte Saint-Luc	Quebec	Inactive	
Rho Iota	March 28, 1965		Mobile	Alabama	Inactive	
Rho Eta	May 16, 1965		Oceanside	New York	Inactive	
Rho Tau	May 16, 1965		Kew Gardens	New York	Inactive	
Rho Lambda	June 10, 1965		Alexandria	Virginia	Inactive	
Rho Zeta	December 5, 1965		Sharon	Massachusetts	Inactive	
Rho Gamma	May 15, 1966		Montreal	Quebec	Inactive	
Rho Delta	May 22, 1966		Flushing	New York	Inactive	
Sigma Phi	November 20, 1966		Dresher	Pennsylvania	Inactive	
Sigma Omega	April 15, 1967		Montreal	Quebec	Inactive	
Sigma Theta	April 16, 1967		Chomedey	Quebec	Inactive	
Phi Sigma	December 17, 1967		Montreal	Quebec	Inactive	
Phi Theta	February 4, 1968		Toronto	Ontario	Inactive	
Phi Omega	February 4, 1968		Toronto	Ontario	Inactive	
Phi Epsilon	March 17, 1968		Toronto	Ontario	Inactive	
Phi Eta	June 10, 1968		Montreal	Quebec	Inactive	
Beta Phi	October 6, 1968		Toronto	Ontario	Inactive	
Beta Sigma	October 6, 1968		Toronto	Ontario	Inactive	
Beta Theta	October 6, 1968		Toronto	Ontario	Inactive	
Beta Omega	January 5, 1969		Montreal	Quebec	Inactive	
Beta Gamma	April 27, 1969		Montreal	Quebec	Inactive	
Beta Iota	December 19, 1971		Cherry Hill	New Jersey	Inactive	
Beta Epsilon	November 8, 1974		Cherry Hill	New Jersey	Inactive	
Eta Omega	August 14, 1975 – 1989		Cherry Hill	New Jersey	Inactive	(Note: The chapter was formed by members of the Epsilon chapter.)
Beta Beta	November 17, 1999		Owings Mills	Maryland	Inactive	
Beta Xi	November 17, 2002		Potomac	Maryland	Inactive	
**Phi**	December 2022		Richboro and Holland	Pennsylvania	Active	

== Notable members ==
- Emil F. Goldhaber – Chief Bankruptcy Judge of the United States District Court for the Eastern District of Pennsylvania
- Tony Kornheiser – host of ESPN television's Pardon the Interruption and radio host
- Mordechai Leibling – president of Jewish Reconstructionist Federation and director of the Social Justice Organizing Program at the Reconstructionist Rabbinical College
- Howard P. Rovner – president of Temple University's Fox School of Business and former president of the U.S. B'rith Sholom
- Robert A. Rovner – Pennsylvania State Senator
- Ed Snider – chairman of Philadelphia 76ers and Philadelphia Flyers

== See also ==
- List of Jewish fraternities and sororities
