= Beta Gamma Sigma =

International business honor society

- ΒΓΣ
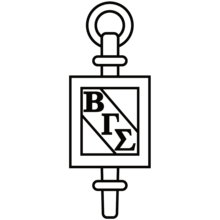
- Founded: February 19, 1913; 113 years ago University of Wisconsin; University of Illinois; University of California
- Type: Honor
- Affiliation: ACHS
- Status: Active
- Emphasis: Business
- Scope: International
- Colors: Royal blue and Gold
- Publication: BGS News
- Chapters: 600+
- Members: 980,000+ active
- Headquarters: 2029 Woodland Parkway Suite 130; St. Louis, Missouri 63146; United States
- Website: www.betagammasigma.org

Beta Gamma Sigma (ΒΓΣ) is an international business honor society. Founded in 1913 at the University of Wisconsin, University of Illinois and the University of California, it has over 980,000 members, selected from more than 600 collegiate chapters in business schools accredited by AACSB International. It has collegiate chapters in over 190 countries.

== History ==
The Society was founded on February 19, 1913 with the union of three pre-existing local societies for men in commerce and economics. These were: Beta Gamma Sigma (1907) at the University of Wisconsin, the Economics Club (1906) at the University of California, and Delta Kappa Chi (1910) at the University of Illinois. The three are considered co-equal founding institutions.

The mission of Beta Gamma Sigma is to encourage and honor academic achievement in the study of business; cultivate and celebrate leadership and professional excellence and build their professional skills; to foster an enduring commitment to honor and integrity, the pursuit of wisdom, earnestness, and service; and to serve its lifetime members by helping them network and connect.

In 1919, Beta Gamma Sigma was designated by the American Association of Collegiate Schools of Business (AACSB) as "the scholarship society" for students in commerce and business administration. Today, only AACSB schools are eligible to host chapters.

On April 29, 1933, Beta Gamma Sigma merged with Gamma Epsilon Pi, a similar organization that had been formed to serve women. Gamma Epsilon Pi had been founded on March 26, 1918, also at the University of Illinois. Beta Gamma Sigma was older, by five years, and the society retained its name.

It joined the Association of College Honor Societies in 1937 and, after leaving, was readmitted in 1990. By 2012, it had 505 active chapters, 24 alumni clubs, 24,552 active members, and 677,352 total members.

In 2020, Beta Gamma Sigma added new societal impact standards and practices, declaring that business can be a force for global good and have committed to incorporating the environmental, social, & governance (ESGs) criteria and the Sustainable Development Goals (SDGs) into their business operations and programming.

Beta Gamma Sigma members reside in over 190 countries and there are more than fifty alumni chapters and networking groups located in major metropolitan areas and other regions worldwide. Alumni groups provide ongoing educational and networking opportunities for members in person and virtually. Its national headquarters are in St. Louis, Missouri.

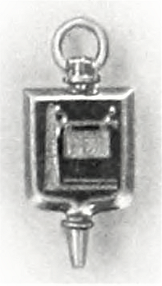
Gamma Epsilon Pi badge, before the 1933 merger

== Symbols ==
Beta Gamma Sigma explains its name as Beta (Β) is the initial letter of the Greek word BEBAEOS, which signifies honor, Gamma (Γ) is the initial letter of the Greek word GNOSIS, which means wisdom, and Sigma (Σ) is the initial letter of the Greek word, which SPOUDE means earnestness. The society's badge is a rectangular shield with the Greek letters ΒΓΣ on a diagonal band.

The society's colors are royal blue and gold. Its publication is BGS News.

== Chapters ==
Beta Gamma Sigma has chapters across the United States and around the world.

== Membership ==
Membership is by invitation only. To be eligible for membership, undergraduate students must be in the top ten percent of a bachelors business program after completing half of the coursework for a degree. Graduate students must be the top twenty percent for masters programs. Doctoral students are eligible for membership after having successfully defended their dissertation.

== Governance ==
Governance of the society is by convention, held biennially, with intermediate administration vested in a Board of Governors, these holding staggered, four-year terms.

== See also ==
- AACSB schools
- Association of College Honor Societies
- Honor cords
- Professional fraternities and sororities
- Olivaint Conference of Belgium
