= Theta Kappa Omega =

Defunct American high school fraternity

- ΘΚΩ
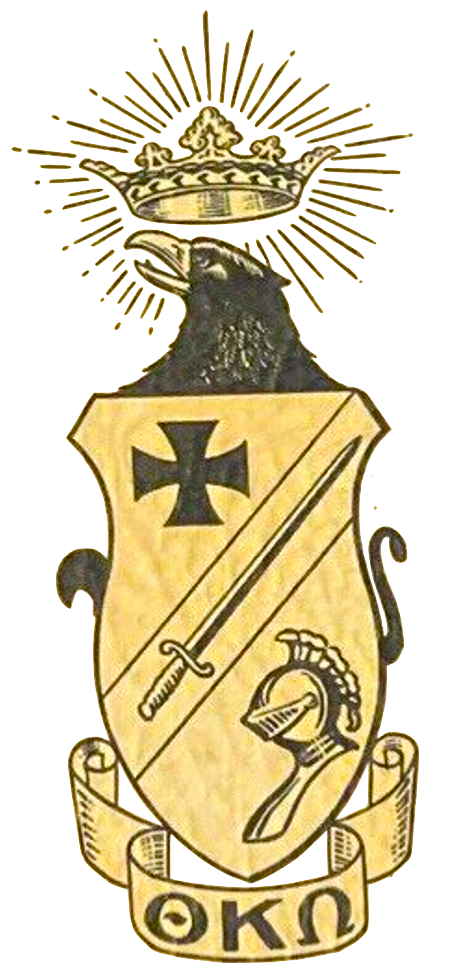
- Founded: 1872; 154 years ago California Military Academy
- Type: Social
- Affiliation: Independent
- Status: Defunct
- Defunct date: c. 2000
- Emphasis: High school
- Scope: National
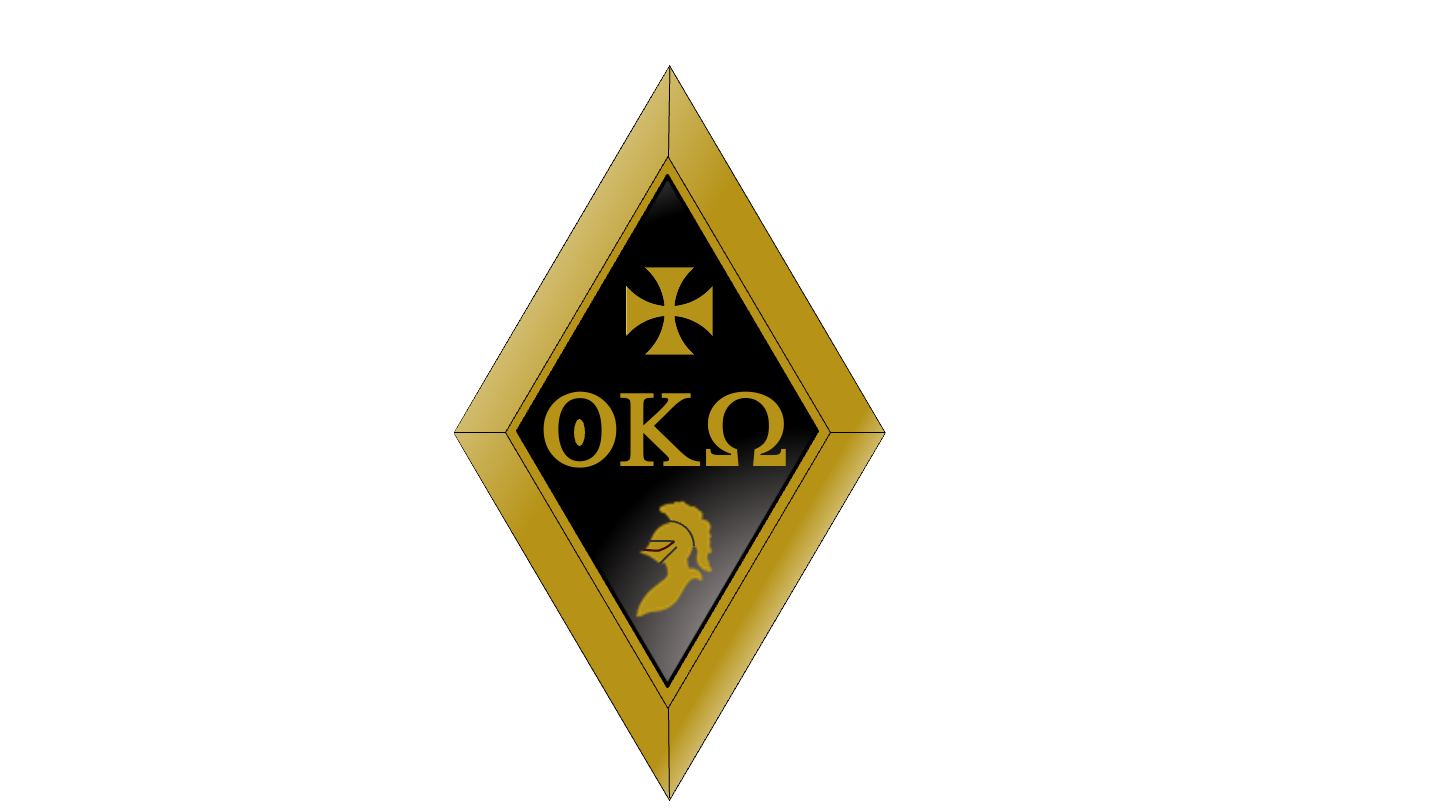
- Member badge
- Colors: Black and Old gold
- Symbol: Griffin
- Flower: White rose
- Publication: Teke Echoes
- Chapters: 65+
- Nickname: TKO, Teke
- Headquarters: United States

Theta Kappa Omega (ΘΚΩ), also known by its nicknames “TKO” or "Teke", was a social secondary fraternity for high school–aged men founded in 1872 at California Military Academy in Mayfield, California. The fraternity established local chapters in towns and cities across the United States. The chapters were run by a chapter president, known as the Grand Master, and other elected officers. The national fraternity was governed by an elected body of alumni known as the Grand Council. National conventions were held annually. Most chapters were defunct by the end of the 1960s.

== History ==
=== Founding ===
Theta Kappa Omega began in late 1872 at the California Military Academy in Mayfield, California. On November 13, 1872, three cadets met to discuss the problem of one of their comrades. This friend was of high moral character and intelligence, but planned to discontinue his education since he could no longer pay all of his school expenses. The three students pledged to pay their friend's expenses so that he could continue his education.

In 1875, their friend graduated from California Military Academy, after having received help from his three companions for the past three years. To show his gratitude and to extend help to all deserving students, he organized an undergraduate group into the Theta Kappa Omega fraternity. This first chapter, Alpha, was located at the California Military Academy.

The history of Theta Kappa Omega Fraternity between 1872 and 1926 is very vague. During that period, the national headquarters were in the hands of the Alpha chapter. In 1899, all records were destroyed by a fire at the California Military Academy.

=== Peaks and valleys ===
Additional chapters were added to Theta Kappa Omega between 1885 and 1905. All history concerning Beta and a subsequent chapter, Gamma, was lost. From 1915 through 1924, the lack of organization, poor leadership, and strict rules prevented the organization from expanding. When the California Military Academy ruled against fraternities, the Alpha chapter was dissolved, and the Beta chapter took over the national leadership.

The Delta chapter was established on September 28, 1906, by Charles Shamotulski and Carl T. McPheeters at Columbia Military Academy. Gamma ceased to exist before 1911. A school ruling against fraternities forced the closure of Beta, and finally Delta chapter of Columbia Military Academy became the official national headquarters.

In 1911, William H. Riley was Grand Master of Delta and, therefore, the fraternity's national president. The following year, he transferred to Gulf Coast Military Academy, where he installed the Zeta chapter in October, the first fraternity in that school. Delta was also responsible for the installation of Chi and Epsilon chapters at Atlanta, Georgia and also Alpha Beta at Memphis, Tennessee. These chapters were formed in a city rather than a school, an innovation for T.K.O., selecting outstanding boys of a town rather than the usual military boarding school.

Chi chapter was formerly Delta Tau Sigma Fraternity, a local which was organized on February 24, 1923. Immediately following their petition to the Delta chapter, H. Grayson Lambert Jr., Delta chapter Grand Master, and G. O. Melchor installed them into T.K.O. Chi, which was admitted into the Pan Hellenic Council of Boy's High School soon after it became a chapter. Shortly after Chi was installed in Atlanta, Georgia, the Epsilon chapter was also founded there. This was the first time there existed two chapters of T.K.O in the same city.

In September 1925, Warfield Rogers, H. Grayson Lambert, Jr., Harry Rogers, Grattan Brown, Herman Jorgenson, and Julian James met in Memphis, Tennessee and decided that in the best interest of their fraternity, the national headquarters should be moved from Delta chapter to Memphis, Tennessee, and that the national work of the fraternity should be carried on by a body of alumni from three or more chapters. This body of men is to be known as the Grand Council.

=== Expansion ===
Between 1925 and 1930, 37 chapters were installed. By May 1926, the fraternity was international with chapters located in Canada and London, England. In June 1931, the fraternity had 7,500 members and 41 chapters; all but three chapters were location in the Southern United States. It held a national convention in Birmingham, Alabama, from June 22 to 25, 1931.

In January 1928, the ritual and black book were printed and distributed by the Grand Council. In the same year, the official song of T.K.O. was written by Oscar Hurt and Julian James. The Endowment Fund of T.K.O. was established at the Biloxi Convention in 1933. Eight hundred dollars left from the administration of John Singreen was used to start the Endowment Fund, and Singreen served as its trustee. J.B. Hermon was instrumental in building the fund during the years of 1934 to 1940 to about $3,000. Singreen revised the blackbook and the new edition was issued in February 1935. Singreen also compiled the National Directory in 1932.

=== 1940s and 1950s ===
The late 1940s were marked by some twenty active chapters, with the best-attended conventions in its history. Some two hundred brothers gathered in Atlanta, Memphis, or New Orleans. Following this period, the early 1950s saw an increase in anti-fraternity activity, and subsequently, a reduction in the active chapters, with a low of eight in 1957. However, this period was certainly not without bright spots - the Teke Echoes became firmly established under the supervision of Jack Francis as the leading secondary fraternity publication; Tekes assumed leadership positions in the Inter-Fraternity Congress; and conventions were held in such places as New Orleans, Mobile, and Biloxi.

The installation of Theta Gamma in 1959 signaled new success in the expansion efforts of the fraternity. The reactivation of Zeta Nu and Delta Epsilon and the installation of Theta Zeta, Theta Eta, and Theta Mu revived the fraternity, and an era of greater acceptance of the role of fraternities began.

=== 1960s ===
1963 saw the fraternity's endowment fund reach the long-sought objective of $10,000. Because of financial inflation occurring in the nation, in 1967, the fraternity raised its national dues from the original $40 per chapter, which had been established in 1925, to $60 per chapter. A second expansion wave started in 1968 with the installation of Theta Kappa, Theta Lambda, and Theta Nu.

== Symbols ==
The fraternity's original coat-of-arms showed a griffin standing rampant, or, in full standing position, with a smaller shield, and the paw grasping the sword at a salute. In September 1925, the Grand Council adopted an updated coat of arms. The shield displays a Maltese cross, a sword, and a plumed knight’s helmet. From the top of the shield extends a griffin’s head. On one side, the griffin’s talon emerges from behind the shield, while on the other side, the griffin’s tail. Beneath the shield is a scroll bearing the Greek letters ΘΚΩ. Above all is a crown surrounded by rays of glory.

The fraternity's badge was in the shape of a diamond, enameled in black. At the top of the badge is a Maltese Cross, across the center are the Greek letters "ΘΚΩ", and, at the base, a plumed knight's helmet in profile; all in gold. Until the 1940s, the bottom of the badge displayed the Greek letters of the member's chapter in place of the knight's helmet. During that period, Theta Kappa Omega was the only secondary fraternity that displayed a member's chapter letters on the face of its badge.

The pledge pin was in the shape of an equilateral triangle with the Greek letters ΘΚΩ displayed across the bottom. The pin was enameled in black with the Greek letters in gold.

The fraternity's flower was the white rose. Its colors were black, white, and gold. Its publication was Teke Echoes. The official song was "Sweetheart of T.K.O."; the words were written by Oscar Hurt and Julian James, and the music by Rupert Biggadike. The song was recorded by the Columbia Phonograph Co. in 1928, with music provided by Oscar Celestin and his original Tuxedo Band of New Orleans.

== Chapters ==
Following is an incomplete list of Theta Kappa Omega chapters, with inactive chapters and institutions indicated in italics.

| Chapter | Chapter date and range | Institution | Location | Status | References |
|---|---|---|---|---|---|
| Alpha | 1872–19xx ? | California Military Academy | Mayfield, California | Inactive | (Note: Chapter closed because of institutional policies against fraternities.) |
| Beta | 18xx ?–19xx ? | Unknown | Unknown | Inactive | |
| Gamma | xxxx ?– before 1911 | Unknown | Unknown | Inactive | |
| Delta | September 28, 1906 – 19xx ? | Columbia Military Academy | Columbia, Tennessee | Inactive | |
| Zeta | October 1912 – 19xx ? | Gulf Coast Military Academy | Gulfport, Mississippi | Inactive | |
| Chi (see Chi Epsilon) | 1923–1929 | Technological High School (now Midtown High School) | Atlanta, Georgia | Inactive | (Note: The Chi chapter was formed from Delta Tau Sigma, a local fraternity that had been organized on February 24, 1923. In 1929, Atlanta's Chi and Epsilon chapters merged to become the Chi Epsilon chapter.) |
| Epsilon (see Chi Epsilon) | 1924–1929 | University School for Boys | Atlanta, Georgia | Inactive | (Note: In 1929, Atlanta's Chi and Epsilon chapters merged to become the Chi Epsilon chapter.) |
| Alpha Beta | July 1924–19xx ? | | Memphis, Tennessee | Inactive | |
| | 192x ?–19xx ? | Texas Military College | Terrell, Texas | Inactive | |
| Delta Eta | 192x ?–19xx ? | | Texarkana, Arkansas | Inactive | |
| Delta Psi | 1925–19xx ? | | Baton Rouge, Louisiana | Inactive | |
| Delta Beta | 1925–19xx ? | | Jackson, Mississippi | Inactive | |
| Delta Gamma | May 1926–19xx ? | | Shreveport, Louisiana | Inactive | |
| Delta Epsilon | October 1926–19xx ? | | Hattiesburg, Mississippi | Inactive | (Note: Chapter formed from the Chi Lambda Chi Club (local), established in 1926.) |
| Delta Kappa | December 4, 1926 – 19xx ? | | Little Rock, Arkansas | Inactive | |
| Delta Zeta | 192x ?–19xx ? | | Jacksonville, Florida | Inactive | |
| Delta Eta | 192x ?–19xx ? | | Texarkana, Arkansas | Inactive | |
| Delta Iota | January 1927–19xx ? | | Dallas, Texas | Inactive | |
| Delta Mu | February 2, 1927 – 19xx ? | | Jackson, Tennessee | Inactive | |
| Delta Nu | February 6, 1927 – 19xx ? | | El Dorado, Arkansas | Inactive | |
| Delta Lambda | February 14, 1927 – 193x ? | Knoxville High School | Knoxville, Tennessee | Inactive | |
| Delta Omicron | March 1927–19xx ? | | Biloxi, Mississippi | Inactive | |
| Delta Xi | April 14, 1927 – 19xx ? | | Clarksdale, Mississippi | Inactive | |
| Delta Theta | April, 1927 – 19xx ? | | Mobile, Alabama | Inactive | |
| Delta Rho | April 21, 1927 – 19xx ? | | Birmingham, Alabama | Inactive | |
| Delta Pi | May 13, 1927 – 19xx ? | | New Orleans, Louisiana | Inactive | |
| Delta Tau | 192x ?–19xx ? | New Mexico Military Institute | Roswell, New Mexico | Inactive | |
| Delta Phi | June 4, 1927 – 19xx ? | | Nashville, Tennessee | Inactive | |
| Delta Omega | March 1928–19xx ? | | Chattanooga, Tennessee | Inactive | |
| Zeta Alpha | April 1928–19xx ? | | Kansas City, Missouri | Inactive | |
| Zeta Beta | 192x ?–19xx ? | Chamberlain Hunt Academy | Port Gibson, Mississippi | Inactive | |
| Zeta Gamma | September 1, 1928 – 19xx ? | | Paris, Texas | Inactive | |
| Zeta Delta | 1928–19xx ? | | Lubbock, Texas | Inactive | |
| Zeta Epsilon | November 24, 1928 – 19xx ? | Mamaroneck School | Larchmont, New York | Inactive | |
| Chi Epsilon (see Chi and Epsilon) | 1929–19xx ? | | Atlanta, Georgia | Inactive | |
| Zeta Eta | December 21, 1928 –19xx ? | | Houston, Texas | Inactive | |
| | c. 1929–19xx ? | | Lakeland, Florida | Inactive | |
| Zeta Theta | January 1, 1929 – 19xx ? | | Ardmore, Oklahoma | Inactive | |
| Zeta Kappa | February 1929–19xx ? | | Stillwater, Oklahoma | Inactive | |
| Zeta Lambda | April 5, 1929 – mid-1960s | | West Palm Beach, Florida | Inactive | |
| Zeta Nu | April 21, 1929 – 19xx ? | | Jonesboro, Arkansas | Inactive | |
| Zeta Mu | May 4, 1929 – 19xx ? | | Tulsa, Oklahoma | Inactive | |
| Zeta Pi | June 10, 1929 – 19xx ? | | Meridian, Mississippi | Inactive | |
| Zeta Rho | 1930 | | Beaumont, Texas | Inactive | |
| Zeta Tau | February 1931–19xx ? | | Amarillo, Texas | Inactive | |
| Zeta Sigma | 1932–19xx ? | | Pelham, New York | Inactive | |
| Zeta Upsilon | 1934–19xx ? | Riverside Military Academy | Gainesville, Georgia | Inactive | |
| Zeta Phi | February 22, 1935 – 19xx ? | | Corpus Christi, Texas | Inactive | |
| Zeta Chi | November 1935–19xx ? | | New Rochelle, New York | Inactive | |
| Zeta Psi | December 1935–19xx ? | | Columbus, Mississippi | Inactive | |
| Zeta Omega (see Theta Eta) | 1936–19xx ? | | Oklahoma City, Oklahoma | Inactive | |
| Sigma Alpha | 1938– late 1990s | | Laurel, Mississippi | Inactive | |
| Sigma Beta | July 10, 1938 – 19xx ? | | Amarillo, Texas | Inactive | |
| Sigma Delta | August 4, 1940 – 19xx ? | | Marshall, Texas | Inactive | (Note: Chapter formed from the Kappa Alpha chapter of Theta Gamma Sigma fraternity, established in 1934.) |
| Kappa Phi | November 27, 1941 – 19xx ? | | Camden, Arkansas | Inactive | |
| Sigma Epsilon | 194x ?–19xx ? | | Magnolia, Arkansas | Inactive | |
| Sigma Zeta | 194x ?–19xx ? | | Starkville, Mississippi | Inactive | |
| Sigma Nu | August 2, 1944 – 19xx ? | | Lexington, Tennessee | Inactive | |
| | 1956–19xx ? | | Dyersburg, Tennessee | Inactive | |
| Theta Beta | May 1957–19xx ? | | Bogalusa, Louisiana | Inactive | |
| Theta Gamma | 1958–19xx ? | | Union City, Tennessee | Inactive | |
| Theta Zeta | March 17, 1962 – 19xx ? | | Springfield, Missouri | Inactive | |
| Theta Eta (see Zeta Omega) | August 17, 1963 – 19xx ? | Casady School | Oklahoma City, Oklahoma | Inactive | |
| Theta Eta (see Zeta Omega) | August 17, 1963 – 19xx ? | Classen High School | Oklahoma City, Oklahoma | Inactive | |
| Theta Eta (see Zeta Omega) | August 17, 1963 – 19xx ? | Northwest Classen High School | Oklahoma City, Oklahoma | Inactive | |
| Theta Iota | 1968–19xx ? | | Pensacola, Florida | Inactive | |
| Theta Kappa | 1968–19xx ? | | | Inactive | |
| Theta Lambda | 1968 –19xx ? | | | Inactive | |
| Theta Mu | 196x?–19xx ? | East Jefferson High School | Metairie, Louisiana | Inactive | |
| Theta Nu | 1968–19xx ? | | | Inactive | |
