= Phi Sigma Chi =

American secondary school fraternity

- ΦΣΧ
- Coat of Arms Phi Sigma Chi
- Founded: November 1901; 124 years ago Zanesville High School
- Type: Secondary
- Former affiliation: High School Panhellenic Council; Grand Inter-Fraternity Council
- Status: Defunct
- Scope: National
- Motto: Amicitia et Fraternitas "Friendship and Brotherhood"
- Colors: Black and Gold
- Symbol: Book and lamp
- Flower: White carnation
- Mascot: Owl
- Publication: The Chapter Hall
- Former name: Delta Theta Omega
- Headquarters: United States

Phi Sigma Chi (ΦΣΧ) was an American secondary social fraternity. It was founded in 1901 in at the Zanesville High School in Zanesville, Ohio. It was a founding member of the Grand Inter-Fraternity Council.

== History ==
Murrel L. J. Logsdon established the local fraternity, Delta Theta Omega, at the Zanesville High School of Zanesville, Ohio, in November 1900. Its charter members were Edgar H. Johnson, Murrel L. J. Logsdon, Edgar R. Moeser, J. Herbert Norris, Harry C. Orr, and Cassell Stewart. In addition, Arthur C. Lindsay was associated with the founding and treated as an honorary member.

Delta Theta Omega became Phi Sigma Chi on November 1 or 28, 1901. The fraternity had a hall in the third floor of the Zanesville Bank Building on 15 North Fourth Street. Its members celebrated the Feast of the White Carnation and the Feast of the Book and Lamp.

Also in November 1901, two additional chapters were chartered at high schools in McConnelsville and Lancaster, Ohio. Logsdon was the fraternity's first president. In May 1902, Logsdon helped to reorganize the local fraternity into a national fraternity, overseeing a new charter and updated rituals. The ritual was written by high school teacher C. S. Hoskinson, who was later made an honorary member of the fraternity.

By May 1903, Phi Sigma Chi was organized had eleven chapters that were organized into four provinces. Because the Zanesville School Board has passed an order forbidding fraternities and class organization, Phi Sigma Chi began operating independently of the schoolboard and faculty. The fraternity held its first national convention in Zanesville on August 25 and 26, 1903.

Phi Sigma Chi joined the Grand Inter-Fraternity Council in February 1911. At the time, the fraternity had forty chapters were located at high schools and preparatory schools in the United States. The fraternity held its second national convention August 9 through 11, 1911. In 1912, its convention was held in Indianapolis, Indiana, followed by Philadelphia, Pennsylvania, in 1914.

By August 1915, Phi Sigma Chi had 49 chapters and more than 7,000 members. At the 1915 national convention, the Olympian Club of Lincoln, Nebraska and the Delta Delta Delta (local) of Denver, Colorado, were chartered as new chapters of Phi Sigma Chi. However, a few years later, anti-fraternity sentiment had grown across the United States, with most states passing laws to ban high school fraternities. Phi Sigma Chi continued to operated a social fraternity, with many chapters in the Southern United States. Unfortunately, the records and history of this era were lost.

After the dissolution of the Grand Inter-Fraternity Council, Phi Sigma Chi became a member of the High School Panhellenic Council. The fraternity's 35th convention in New Orleans, Louisiana, on August 9 and 10, 1937, was attended by representatives from forty of its 95 chapters. Some of its chapters were affiliated with colleges and universities.

In 1951, the fraternity celebrated its 50th anniversary in Zanesville. Its national headquarters was in New Orleans, Louisiana in 1975. The fraternity was adding chapters until at least 1992, but has since gone inactive.

== Symbols ==
Phi Sigma Chi's motto was Amicitia et Fraternitas or "Friendship and Brotherhood". Its colors were black and gold. The fraternity's mascot was the owl. Its flower was the white carnation. Its symbols were a book and the lamp.

The fraternity's quarterly publication was The Chapter Hall, first published in May 1903. In 1939, this had the largest circulation of any fraternity magazine in the United States, with a circulation of nearly 18,000.

== Chapters ==
In 1915, Phi Sigma Chi had chapters in the following states and cities:

- Alabama: Mobile
- Arizona: Tucson
- California: Berkeley, Los Angeles, Sacramento San Francisco
- Colorado: Denver
- Florida: Wachula
- Kansas: Hutchinson, Kansas City, Lawrence, Leavenworth, Manhattan, Otwawa
- Illinois: Cairo, Chicago, Evanston, Kankakee, Quincy
- Indiana: Indianapolis, Lafayette, Logansport, West Lafayette
- Massachusetts: Brookline
- Michigan: Bay City
- Missouri: Kansas City, Lexington, St. Louis, St. Joseph
- Nebraska: Lincoln
- Ohio: Alliance, Cambridge, Canal Dover, Chillicothe, Columbus, Coshocton, Dennison, Gambier, Granville, Hamilton, Lancaster, McConnelsville, Mt. Vernon, New Philadelphia, Newark, Steubenville, Toledo, Urbana, Zanesville (Alpha)
- Pennsylvania: Philadelphia, Philadelphia, and West Philadelphia
- Virginia: Staunton

Later chapters include East Jefferson High School and Rummel High School in Metairie, Louisiana. There was a chapter in Murfreesboro, Tenn. in the 1970s. Gamma Alpha chapter was established at Warner Robins High School in Warner Robins, Georgia, on September 14, 1992.

== See also ==
- High school fraternities and sororities
- High school secret societies
