= William Rutherford Mead =

American architect (1846–1928)

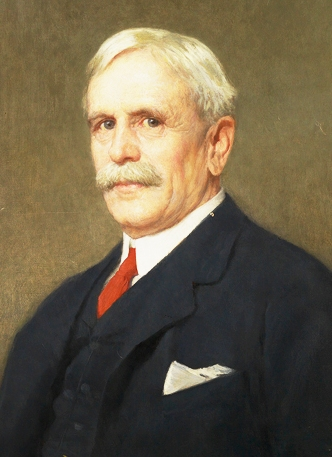
- Born: August 20, 1846; Brattleboro, Vermont, U.S.
- Died: June 19, 1928 (aged 81); Paris, France
- Movement: Beaux-Arts, Architecture

William Rutherford Mead (August 20, 1846 – June 19, 1928) was an American architect who was the "Center of the Office" of McKim, Mead, and White, a noted Gilded Age architectural firm. The firm's other founding partners were Charles Follen McKim (1847–1909) and Stanford White (1853–1906).

== Early life ==
Mead was born in Brattleboro, Vermont. He was a first cousin, once removed of President Rutherford B. Hayes, hence his middle name. His sister, Elinor, later married novelist William Dean Howells, and his younger brother Larkin Goldsmith Mead became a sculptor. Mead was handsome, authoritative and quiet. His father was a prominent lawyer, and his mother was the sister of John Humphrey Noyes, the Oneida Utopian. Mead attended Norwich University for two years, where he joined the Alpha chapter of Theta Chi fraternity. After transferring from Norwich, he graduated from Amherst College in Massachusetts in the class of 1867. He later learned architecture under George Fletcher Babb in Russell Sturgis's office in New York City.

== Career ==
In 1872, Mead partnered with Charles Follen McKim, a fellow New York architect, but Mead's talent was more for running an office rather than designing. This collaboration with McKim produced one of Mead's only known commissions, a house for an Amherst classmate, Dwight Herrick, from Mead's hometown of Chesterfield, New Hampshire.

Around December 1877, the firm took on William Bigelow, the elder brother of McKim's new wife, Annie Bigelow, as a partner, becoming McKim, Mead and Bigelow, with offices at 57 Broadway. In 1879, Bigelow withdrew from the firm, but they were joined by Stanford White to form McKim, Mead, and White. Mead was the partner who "hired and fired", "steered the ship", and spent his time "trying to keep the partners from making damn fools of themselves."

After his 1883 marriage, he moved to Rome, Italy, where he was heavily involved in the American Academy in Rome – McKim's favorite project and legacy – until his death. He was an AAR charter member, as was McKim, a Trustee from 1905 to 1928, and its president from 1910 to 1928. In 1902, King Victor Emmanuel conferred on Mead the decoration of Knight Commander of the Crown of Italy for his pioneer work in introducing the Roman and Italian Renaissance architectural style in America. In 1902, Amherst College conferred upon Mead the honorary degree of LL.D. In 1909, he received a degree of M.S. from Norwich University in Vermont. In 1912 he received the gold medal of the American Academy of Arts and Letters and was an early member of the academy. In 1922 he was appointed a Commander of the Order of the Crown of Italy.

== Personal life ==
In 1883, Mead married Olga Kilyeni (c. 1850–1936) in Budapest, Hungary.

Mead retired in 1920 and died on June 30, 1928, in a Paris hotel room from a heart attack, after an illness of several weeks, with his wife at his side. Mead was the last of the firm's founding partners to die, as McKim died in 1909, after White in 1906. At his death, his estate of $250,000 went to his wife, Olga. Olga moved in with her sister in New York City, and died on April 10, 1936, in New York City in her apartment in the Sherry-Netherland Hotel. She left her entire estate to the trustees of Amherst College. The money was used to build the Mead Art Building, which was designed by James Kellum Smith of McKim, Mead and White. The building was completed in 1949 and houses the Mead Art Museum.
