= Battle Command Training Center-Leavenworth =

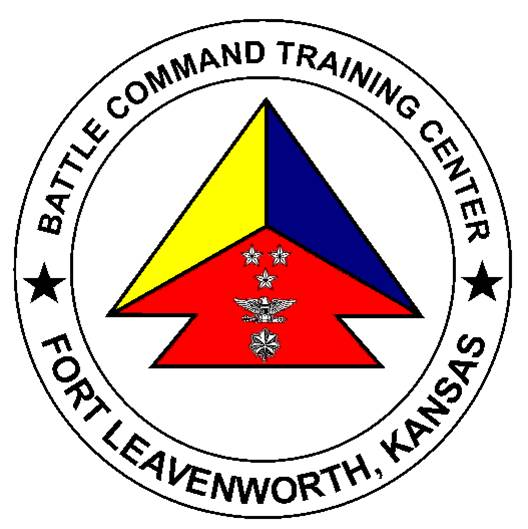
BCTC-Leavenworth Logo

Battle Command Training Center - Leavenworth (BCTC-Lvn) provides battle command and staff training, training support, and publications to Army National Guard Soldiers and units, at its facility in Fort Leavenworth, Kansas, USA, or via mobile training teams, prior to mobilization to assist them prepare for full-spectrum operations in a joint, interagency, intergovernmental, and multinational environment.

It was founded in 1991 by the National Guard (NG), in close cooperation with the Combined Arms Center (CAC), Kansas National Guard (KSNG), and the 35th Infantry Division (Mechanized), with the purpose of improving Army National Guard (ARNG) division battle command and staff training.

BCTC-Lvn has incrementally improved and expanded since its founding. The BCTC-Lvn is one of three ARNG Battle Command Training Centers within the Battle Command Training Capability Program (BCTCP). The other two centers are located at Camp Dodge, Iowa and Fort Indiantown Gap, Pennsylvania.

BCTC-Lvn is not to be confused with the Mission Command Training Program (MCTP) (formerly designated the Battle Command Training Program, or BCTP), also at Fort Leavenworth, Kansas. The MCTP, a subordinate organization of CAC, is tasked to provide full-spectrum operations training support for senior commanders and their staffs (brigade-level and above). BCTC-Lvn works with the MCTP to provide this training for ARNG battalion, brigade, and division commanders and their staffs. BCTC-Lvn provides the facilities, networks, equipment, and life support for ARNG units conducting MCTP-led, full-spectrum exercise rotations.

== Background ==
In the early 1980s, the National Guard Bureau (NGB), CAC, and the Adjutant General, State of Kansas (TAG-KS) envisioned constructing a combined federal facility to serve as a training center in support of ARNG division battle staff exercises required by the US Army Forces Command (USFORSCOM) and to provide a facility to host the Headquarters, 35th Infantry Division. The Army licensed land on Fort Leavenworth, KS to TAG-KS to build a facility with funding from NGB. This facility would serve the dual purpose as an armory and division training center for the newly activated 35th Infantry Division. The original organization, the Leader Development Center, later became a federal field operating agency of the NGB, with the mission to support the same battle command and staff training for the ARNG, as it was for Army Active Component units. BCTC-Lvn also hosts ARNG division-level full spectrum exercises and the 35th Infantry Division headquarters.

== Major milestones ==
- 1982 – Vision by NGB, CAC, and TAG-KS to create an ARNG training center.
- 1985 – Military construction plan submitted to build armory and training center on land leased by TAG-KS from Fort Leavenworth.
- 1989 – Construction of original facility (Bldg 1951) began.
- 1990 – Construction of original facility completed; Memorandum of Agreement (MOA) between CAC, NGB, TAG-KS, and 35th Infantry Division authorizing construction and mutual use of a reconfigurable standard command post facility.
- 1991 – Leader Development Center achieved initial operational capability; Battle Command Training Program (BCTP) pilot rotation for ARNG divisions conducted at the Leader Development Center; construction increased space in the main facility and added separate tactical operations center (TOC) buildings.
- 1993 – The Brigade Command and Battle Staff Training Program (BCBST) begun for ARNG enhanced separate brigades (later combined into BCTP exercises).
- 1994 – Director, ARNG; Commander, CAC; and TAG-KS sign memorandum of understanding (MOU) establishing and defining the operational relationships between the LDC, CAC, and KSNG.
- 1997/1998 – Building 1952, TOCs Five and Six, Building Eight, and additional parking constructed.
- 1999 – Command, Control, Communications, Computers, and Intelligence Support Team formed, later to become the Army Battle Command Systems Support Team (ABCS-ST).
- 2000 – Current MOA among Director, ARNG; Commander, CAC; and TAG-KS signed; full-time staff transitioned to Title 10 Active Guard and Reserve status under a new organization.
- 2001 – Leader Development Center renamed the LTG Herbert R. Temple Battle Command Training Center in honor of former Chief, NGB.
- 2003 – Battalion Staff Training Program (BSTP) formed, adding an “analog” military decision making process (MDMP) training capability, in the form of the Battalion Staff Training Team, as well as data analysis and publications capabilities through the Training Analysis Feedback Team (TAFT). TAFT publishes the first edition of The Azimuth, a quarterly training feedback publication for the ARNG.
- 2004 – BCTC-Lvn established a partnership with the Center for Army Lessons Learned (CALL).
- 2006 – BCTC-Lvn supported the first eXportable Combat Training Center (XCTC) rotation and established the Leader Training Program (LTP) to provide regular support to XCTC events.
- 2007 – BCTC-Lvn partnered with the British Army, supporting Exercise EAGLE OWL, a staff exercise for the UK Defence Academy Intermediate Command and Staff Course (Land).
- 2009 – BCTC-Lvn hosted US Army North Exercise VIBRANT RESPONSE, the command’s largest and first echelon-above-division (EAD) event; doubled the size of the Battalion Staff Training Team (re-designated the Battle Staff Training Team), increasing from three to six mobile training teams; continued expansion with completion of a division main command post building.
- 2010 – TAFT began publishing The Picket, a quarterly training news publication for the ARNG.
