= Phi Sigma Chi (honorary) =

American women's honor society for commerce

- ΦΣΧ
- Founded: February 17, 1919; 106 years ago University of Washington
- Type: Honor
- Affiliation: Independent
- Status: Merged
- Successor: Gamma Epsilon Pi
- Emphasis: Business administration
- Scope: National
- Colors: Yellow and Blue
- Flower: Jonquil
- Chapters: 2
- Headquarters: United States

Phi Sigma Chi (ΦΣΧ) was an honorary women's fraternity for commerce. It was founded in 1919 at the University of Washington in Seattle, Washington. It merged with Gamma Epsilon Pi, a similar organization, in 1922.

== History ==
Phi Sigma Chi was founded on February 17, 1919, at the University of Washington in Seattle, Washington. It was established as an honorary fraternity for women who were enrolled in schools for business administration. Its founders were Marguerite Brueggerhoff, Barbara Gamwell, Helen Hanson, Anna Marie Brueggerhoff Mann, Flora Rice Oswalt, Lettie Lee Rochester, and Charlotte Winter.

A second chapter was established at the University of Texas later in 1919. By 1920, its two chapters had initiated 24 members. Admission into the society was secured by having an "A" average for three years.

In June 1922, Phi Sigma Chi representatives attended a joint national convention in Minneapolis, Minnesota with Gamma Epsilon Pi and Alpha Gamma Pi, two other women's business honor societies. The three groups agreed to merge under the Gamma Epsilon Pi name. Both chapters of Phi Sigma Chi merged into Gamma Epsilon Pi.

== Symbols ==
Phi Sigma Chi's colors were yellow and blue. Its flower was the jonquil.

== Activities ==
Phi Sigma Chi sponsored a business bureau, assisting female students in securing jobs in stenography and clerical work. The society also advocated for an honor system for examinations on campus.

== Chapters ==
Following are the chapters of Phi Sigma Chi.

Chapter	Charter date and range	Institution	Location	Status	Ref.
Alpha	February 17, 1919 – June 1922	University of Washington	Seattle, Washington	Merged (ΓΕΠ)	(Note: Became the Alpha Beta chapter of Gamma Epsilon Pi with the national merger of the two women's fraternities.)
Beta	1919–June 1922	University of Texas	Austin, Texas	Merged (ΓΕΠ)	(Note: Became the Alpha Delta chapter of Gamma Epsilon Pi with the national merger of the two women's fraternities.)
