= Kappa Alpha Pi (secondary) =

Defunct American high school fraternity

- ΚΑΠ
- Founded: March 7, 1904; 122 years ago Englewood High School
- Type: Social
- Affiliation: Independent
- Status: Defunct
- Defunct date: c. 1965
- Emphasis: High school
- Scope: National
- Colors: Black and Gold
- Publication: Kappa Alpha Pi Journal
- Chapters: 50+
- Former name: Harvard Athletic Club
- Headquarters: United States

ΚΑΠ (Kappa Alpha Pi) was a high school fraternity founded in 1904 at Englewood High School in Chicago, Illinois, United States. It went inactive during the 1960s.

== History ==
On June 11, 1902, nine men at Englewood High School in Chicago, Illinois formed a club known as the Harvard Athletic Club. The club was organized for the purpose of fostering sports in the school. They designed a club pin that was a crimson diamond with a white "H" in the middle. Soon after the formation of the Harvard Athletics Club, the men constructed a cinder track near the school where they trained for track events.

In the years prior to the formation of the Harvard Athletics Club, several high school fraternities had been founded in the Chicago area, and their popularity had grown tremendously. Omicron Kappa Pi was founded in 1893, and Beta Zeta Phi and Delta Sigma were founded in 1897. As a result of issues caused by the growing popularity of these organizations, the administration at Englewood gave numerous lectures warning against membership in fraternities, exemplifying the pitfalls and disgrace that came with membership in such organizations. The lectures against fraternity membership piqued the interest of the men of the Harvard Athletics Club, and they decided that they would like to become a fraternity. On December 31, 1903, they changed the name of their group to the Harvards, with the intention of becoming a fraternity.

On March 7, 1904, the Harvards reorganized as Kappa Alpha Pi Fraternity. The men involved at the time of reorganization are credited as being the founders of Kappa Alpha Pi. Those men were Chauncey M. Briggs, Harold R. Cossitt, U. Lloyd Hendrick, Merwin O. Hopkins, Fred G. Lee, William H. McCord, H. Russell Sherwood, R. Clifford Sherwood, and George H. Wright.

With the intention of becoming a national fraternity, Kappa Alpha Pi petitioned the State of Illinois for a charter, and it was granted, in November 1905. By 1930, Kappa Alpha Pi had more than 50 chapters across the United States, with the heaviest concentration in Illinois and California.

As the institution of high school fraternities began to die off, most chapters of Kappa Alpha Pi were inactive by the 1960s.

== Symbols ==
Kappa Alpha Pi's colors were black and gold. Its publication was Kappa Alpha Pi Journal.

== Chapters ==
Following is an incomplete list of Kappa Alpha Pi chapters, with inactive chapters and institutions in italics.

Chapter	Charter date and range	Institution	Location	Status	Ref.
Alpha	March 7, 1904	Englewood High School	Chicago, Illinois	Inactive	
Epsilon	November 7, 1907	Parker High School	Chicago, Illinois	Inactive	
Zeta (First)	1908–1909		Muncie, Indiana	Inactive	(Note: The original Zeta chapter at Muncie, Indiana gave up its charter in 1909, and the Phi Gamma chapter was founded soon after as a replacement.)
Alpha Phi	February 12, 1909	Lowell High School	San Francisco, California	Inactive	
Alpha Theta	April 1909		Santa Rosa, California	Inactive	
Phi Gamma	July 21, 1909		Muncie, Indiana	Inactive	
Xi	September 9, 1909	Thornton Township High School	Harvey, Illinois	Inactive	
Phi Epsilon	May 11, 1910		Oakland, California	Inactive	
Phi Kappa	May 27, 1910		Alameda, California	Inactive	
Alpha Tau	October 30, 1910	South High School	Columbus, Ohio	Inactive	
Sigma Phi	1911	Chico High School	Chico, California	Inactive	
Rho (First)	19xx ?–19xx ?	Central High School	Kansas City, Missouri	Moved	(Note: Rho chapter moved to Southwest High School after World War I.)
Alpha Gamma	November 6, 1912	Jefferson High School	Portland, Oregon	Inactive	
Gamma Beta	March 21, 1914	Yonkers High School	Yonkers, New York	Inactive	
Zeta (Second)	October 10, 1915	Central High School	St. Joseph, Missouri	Inactive	
Rho (Second)	194x?	Southwest High School	Kansas City, Missouri	Inactive	
Alpha Kappa	1921		Sacramento, California	Inactive	
Alpha Beta	February 22, 1926		Stockton, California	Inactive	
Alpha Psi	May 13, 1926		Los Angeles, California	Inactive	
Alpha Xi	October 3, 1926		Marysville, California	Inactive	
Delta Phi	January 9, 1927		Springfield, Illinois	Inactive	
Gamma Theta	January 23, 1927		Yonkers, New York	Inactive	
Gamma Tau	January 23, 1927		New York, New York	Inactive	
Eta Chi		Shawnee High School	Shawnee, Oklahoma	Inactive	
