= High school secret societies =

High school secret societies are a type of secret society founded at, or featuring students associated with, a particular high school. These societies are found primarily in the United States. While American universities have a long tradition of secret societies, societies at the high school level are relatively uncommon.

Documented examples of high school secret societies are found at New England boarding schools, private day schools, and the public high schools of suburban Chicago.

== Phillips Exeter Academy ==
Philips Exeter Academy has been home to several secret societies. Notable societies include the Golden Branch Literary Society, which was founded in 1818, and Pi Kappa Delta, which emerged around 1870.

Members of faculty expressed concern over the disregard for authority and potentially harmful practices of secret societies. They were banned in 1891, unbanned in 1896, and finally formally abolished by the school's Committee on Fraternities in 1942.

== Philips Academy, Andover ==
Secret societies have existed at Philips Academy. One prominent society is Brothers of Auctoritas, Unitas, Veritas which has had well-known members such as George H.W Bush and Godfrey A. Rockefeller. Other secret societies at Philips Academy include Truth, Unity, Brotherhood and the all-female Madame Sarah Abbott Society.

In 1933, the school's trustees passed a resolution to ban secret societies. However, this was met with protest from alumni, and it was agreed that societies would continue to be allowed, with increased restrictions in the following school year. Secret societies were eventually banned at Philips Academy in 2012.

== Illinois public schools ==
By 1900, high school secret societies were a recognizable feature within the school systems in metropolitan Chicago. Otto C. Schneider, President of the Chicago School Board of 1908, took an active role in stopping their influence within secondary schools.

== New York City private schools ==
Secret Societies have long existed at elite New York City private schools, particularly those part of the Ivy Preparatory School League, such as Fieldston, Trinity, and Dalton. Two notable societies at these schools are the Epicurean Pact and Societas Talaria, whose members are chosen for intellectual merit and familial connections.

== See also ==
- Collegiate secret societies in North America
- High school fraternities and sororities
- High school clubs and organizations
