= Camp San Luis Obispo =

California Army National Guard base

- San Luis Obispo County, California

Site information
- Type: Military Base
- Owner: State of California
- Controlled by: California National Guard
- Condition: In use
- Website: calguard.ca.gov/cslo

Location
- Location within California Location within the United States
- Coordinates: 35°19′17″N 120°44′20″W

Site history
- Built: 1928
- Built by: California Army National Guard
- In use: 1928 – Present

Garrison information
- Occupants: 1941-03-10 – 1941-08-22; 1941-09-05 – 1941-12-08; 40th Infantry Division; Deployed to Pacific Theater. 1942-01-17 – 1942-03-01; 1943-01-18 – 1943-03-27; 35th Infantry Division; Deployed to France. 1942-04-24 – 1942-08-14; 1942-10-20 – 1943-01-15; 7th Infantry Division; Deployed to Pacific Theater. 1943-03-28 – 1943-07-21; 6th Infantry Division; Deployed to Pacific Theater. 1943-11-20 – 1944-04-19; 81st Infantry Division; Deployed to Pacific Theater.. 1944-04-22 – 1944-07-02; 96th Infantry Division; Deployed to Pacific Theater. 1944-10-01 – 1944-11-23; 1944-12-04 – 1945-02-05; 86th Infantry Division; Deployed to France.

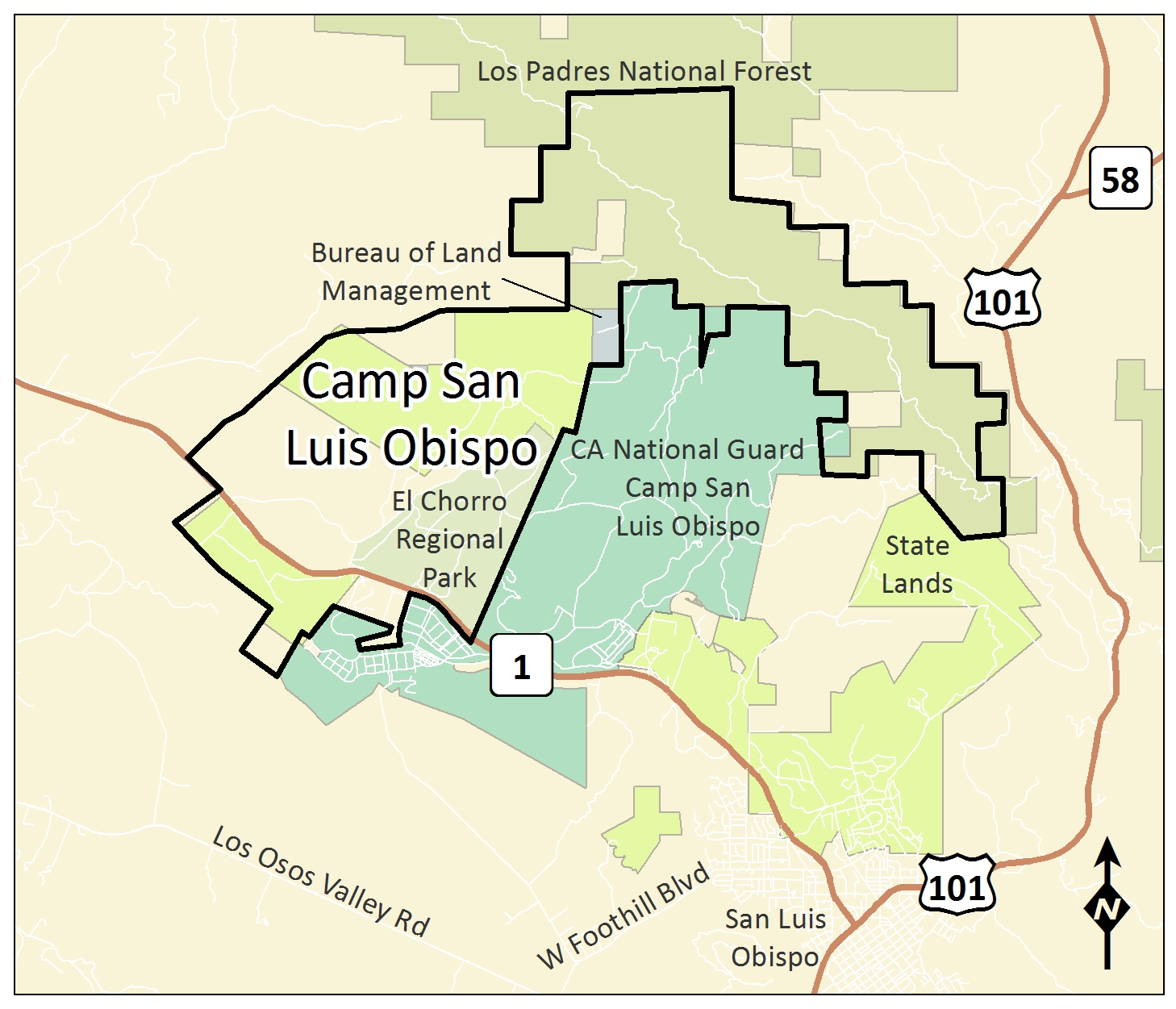
US Army map of Camp San Luis Obispo

Camp San Luis Obispo is the original home of the California Army National Guard. It served as an Infantry Division Camp and Cantonment Area for the United States Army during World War II.

It is in unincorporated San Luis Obispo County, California.

== History ==
Camp San Luis Obispo, formerly called Camp Merriam, was established in 1928 and is called the original home of the California National Guard. The camp is in San Luis Obispo County, which is on the Central Coast of California. State Route 1 passes through the camp about halfway between the cities of Morro Bay and San Luis Obispo. Since World War II, the camp has had an area of 15,433 acres (62 km^{2}). The camp originally comprised 6,274 acres (25 km^{2}), and a further 9,159 acres (37 km^{2}) was acquired during 1941. During World War II, the camp had quarters for 1,523 officers and 19,383 enlisted personnel.

During the Korean war, from early January 1950 to late 1953, the camp was again used by the US Army, for signal corps training. There was eight weeks of basic combat training, shorter than the usual 16 weeks for combat arms. Then there were technical schools at the Southwestern Signal Replacement Training Center, covering perhaps all aspects of the signal corps, from lineman and teletype, to cryptography. It was also a Prisoner of War Camp during WW II.

Cuesta College opened for classes in 1965 on a southwest portion of the camp, rented from the California National Guard. The Cuesta College Board of Trustees purchased 160 acres (0.6 km^{2}) of the camp and 20 acres (81,000 m^{2}) adjoining for a permanent campus. The land was on the other side of Chorro Creek from the temporary campus. Construction was started in 1970 and the transfer from the temporary site was completed in 1978.

El Chorro Regional Park was created in 1972 when over 700 acres (2.8 km^{2}) of the camp were given to San Luis Obispo County. The park contains barbecue facilities, a softball field, volleyball courts and camping sites. Dairy Creek Golf Course is located in the southwestern portion of the park. An area in the northern portion of the park is off limits due to the discovery of unexploded munitions.

Salinas Dam, which forms Santa Margarita Lake, was built to supply water to Camp San Luis Obispo. The lake now supplies water to the city of San Luis Obispo, though it is still owned by the United States Army Corps of Engineers.

The California Office of Emergency Services has several HazMat training areas on the post.

In 2011 portions of the Camp were converted for use as the primary Ranger and Lifeguard (State Park Peace Officer) POST certified law enforcement training facility by California State Parks.

In 2016, the State Parks left Camp San Luis Obispo. In 2018, the California Department of State Hospitals relocated their police officer academy there from Atascadero State Hospital.

== Military academy ==
The California Army National Guard maintains the California Military Academy at Camp San Luis Obispo for the use and training of members of California and other western state National Guard units, as well as for the use of the California State Guard. A major component of the California Military Academy is OCS (Officer Candidate School), designed to train individuals to commission as federally-recognized Second Lieutenants in the U.S. Army National Guard.

== Conservation Corps State Museum ==
The Conservation Corps State Museum is located in four barracks buildings on the grounds of Camp San Luis Obispo. Opened in 1995, the museum exhibits the works of the Civilian Conservation Corps (CCC) in California. One building is a replica of a 1930s CCC barracks, including tools, uniforms and other artifacts. The museum is open by appointment. It contains the library and research center of the National Association of Civilian Conservation Corps Alumni Buildings.

== Youth Programs ==
A major tenant of Camp San Luis Obispo since the early 2000s has been the Grizzly Youth Academy, California's version of the Youth Challenge Program.

Camp San Luis Obispo was assigned as the new permanent headquarters of the California Cadet Corps in July 2011.

The camp also hosts the Civil Air Patrol's Encampment for the California Wing during the summer, as well as the Cadet Programs Conference in mid-February.
