= California Military Academy =

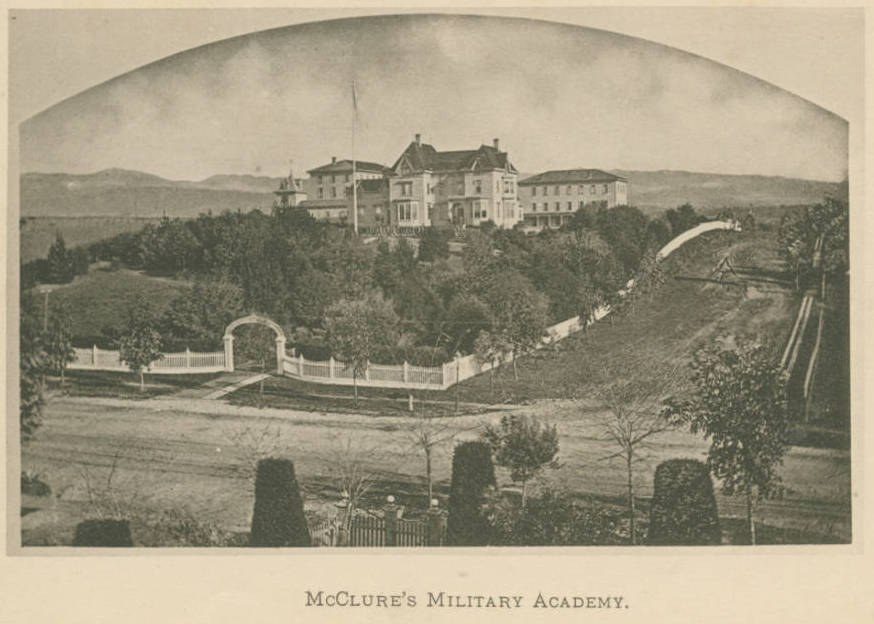
- McClure's Academy in 1892

Location
- California
- Coordinates: 35.325252°N 120.716433°W

Information
- Type: military academy
- Motto: "Train Soldiers to Lead Soldiers"
- Established: 1950

The California Military Academy is a military academy of the California Army National Guard located at Camp San Luis Obispo.

== History ==
The school started as an idea of an "Officer Candidate School" (OCS) in 1950. However, a need for an academy in California convinced Major General Curtis D. O’Sullivan to start a program. The school's first graduating class was in 1951. During the next ten years, the program began to expand. However, the school was not called the California Military Academy until 1961, when training officially came under the new academy. In 1974, the first women graduates were commissioned from the program, two years before West Point started admitting women. The 223rd Infantry Regiment became the official school infantry. Today the academy continues the traditions started half a century ago.

One of the most prominent symbols of the academy is an eagle, found on the side of Guard Mountain.

== Notable alumni ==
- Charles Frederick Crocker-railroad business man
- Tom Selleck, actor

== Original academy ==
From 1865 to 1920, the original academy was in Oakland. It was also known as McClure's Military Academy or the Oakland Military Academy.

== See also ==
- California National Guard
- California Army National Guard
- California State Guard
- Theta Kappa Omega
- 223rd Infantry Regiment (United States)
