= List of Cornell University fraternities and sororities =

This article includes Cornell University's fraternities and sororities. The Cornell University Greek system dates to the first months of university operation during the autumn of 1868. Cornell's co-founder and first president, Andrew Dickson White, was a strong promoter of fraternities as a means of teaching students the principles and responsibilities of self-governance. Among its leaders, other strong supporters of the Greek system were Presidents Edmund Ezra Day and Frank H.T. Rhodes.

Among general ("social") organizations, Cornell currently recognizes 26 Interfraternity Council fraternities, 11 Panhellenic Association sororities, and 15 Multicultural Greek and Fraternal Council fraternities and sororities.

Several national organizations were founded at Cornell. The first intercollegiate social fraternity for black men, Alpha Phi Alpha, was founded at Cornell on December 4, 1906. Delta Chi was founded in 1890 as a professional law fraternity, becoming a general fraternity in 1909. Sigma Delta Tau, originally named Sigma Delta Phi, was established in 1917, Lambda Upsilon Lambda in 1982, and Lambda Pi Chi in 1988.

== Interfraternity Council ==
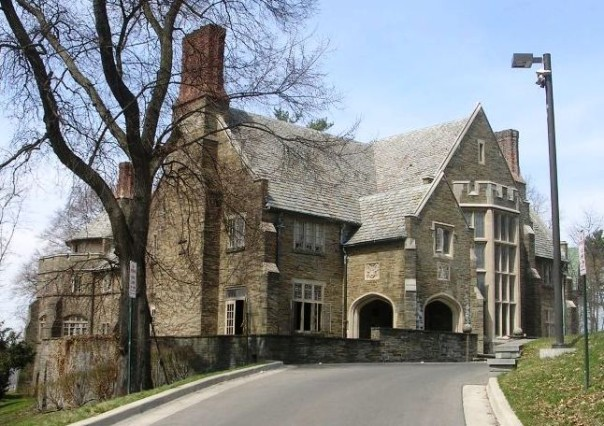
The Alpha Delta Phi house on West Campus

Fraternities constituting the Interfraternity Council (IFC) are listed by dates of local founding and noted with national conference membership where applicable. As of 2026, there are 26 male-only fraternities. Fraternities may be suspended ("de-recognized") or closed for disciplinary or other reasons as determined by the IFC, governing bodies, including national organizations, and/or the University. Dormant houses, which include both closed fraternities and/or those that have forfeited their housing, are italicized. Active houses, including those that have been suspended for a year or less, are in bold.

=== Active chapters ===
NIC indicates current members of the North American Interfraternity Conference; PFA indicates current and former members of the Professional Fraternity Association.

Organization	Letters	Chapter	Charter date and range	Affiliation	Chapter house address	Ref.
Zeta Psi	ΖΨ	Psi	1868	NIC	534 Thurston Avenue	
Alpha Delta Phi	ΑΔΦ	Cornell	1869	NIC	777 Stewart Avenue	
Chi Psi	ΧΨ	Psi	1869–1875, 1885–2014, 2016	NIC	810 University Avenue	(Note: Cornell's chapter of ΧΨ was dormant for ten years shortly after the Civil War, according to Baird's. That record notes that since its revival, it "has stood well.")
Delta Upsilon	ΔΥ	Cornell	1869–2002, 2004	NIC	6 South Avenue	
Delta Kappa Epsilon	ΔΚΕ	Delta Chi	1870–2013, 2017	NIC	13 South Avenue	
Phi Delta Theta	ΦΔΘ	New York-Alpha	1872–1876, 1886–1970, 1973	Independent	2 Ridgewood Road	(Note: ΦΔΘ and ΚΣ withdrew from the NIC in 2002 and TKE in 2016. ΛΧΑ and ΦΣΚ withdrew but later re-joined the organization.)
Beta Theta Pi	ΒΘΠ	Beta Delta	1879	NIC	100 Ridgewood Road	
Phi Gamma Delta	ΦΓΔ (FIJI)	Cornell	1888–1989, 1993–2020, 2022	NIC	118 McGraw Place	
Phi Sigma Kappa	ΦΣΚ	Gamma	1889	NIC	702 University Avenue	
Delta Chi	ΔΧ	Alpha	1890–2003, 2007	NIC	102 The Knoll	
Delta Tau Delta	ΔΤΔ	Beta Omicron	1890	NIC	104 Mary Ann Wood Drive	
Sigma Chi	ΣΧ	Alpha Phi	1890	NIC	106 Cayuga Heights Road	
Sigma Alpha Epsilon	ΣΑΕ	Cornell	1891–1895, 1898–2011, 2022	NIC	122 McGraw Place	
Kappa Sigma	ΚΣ	Alpha Kappa	1892–2010, 2012	Independent	600 University Avenue	
Sigma Nu	ΣΝ	Gamma Theta	1901–2018, 2021	NIC	230 Willard Way	
Acacia		No. 14 Cornell	1907	NIC	318 Highland Road	
Zeta Beta Tau	ΖΒΤ	Kappa	1907–1982, 1989–2013, 2014	NIC	1 Edgecliff Place	(Note: Baird's notes that Cornell's Beta chapter of ΦΣΔ absorbed the Alpha Iota chapter of Phi Alpha fraternity at the merger of those two fraternities in 1959. This was ten years before ΦΣΔ's merger into ΖΒΤ.)
Alpha Sigma Phi	ΑΣΦ	Iota	1909	NIC	804 Stewart Avenue	
Sigma Alpha Mu	ΣΑΜ	Beta	1911–1912, 1915–1973, 1985–2021, 2022	NIC	14 South Avenue	
Kappa Delta Rho	ΚΔΡ	Beta	1913–1943, 1950	NIC	312 Highland Road	
Lambda Chi Alpha	ΛΧΑ	Omicron	1913	NIC	125 Edgemoor Lane	
Alpha Gamma Rho	ΑΓΡ	Zeta	1914	NIC, PFA	203 Highland Avenue	
Pi Kappa Alpha	ΠΚΑ	Beta Theta	1917-2010, 2013	NIC	17 South Avenue	
Sigma Pi	ΣΠ	Mu	1917	NIC	730 University Avenue	
Pi Kappa Phi	ΠΚΦ	Psi	1921–1937, 1949–1986, 1990–2001, 2002	NIC	55 Ridgewood Road	
Phi Kappa Tau	ΦΚΤ	Alpha Tau	1930–1994, 2000	NIC	106 The Knoll	

=== Chapters with name changes ===
- Irving Society - 1868–1869, evolved into ΦΚΨ
- ΑΣΧ - Alpha Sigma Chi, 1871–1879, absorbed into **ΒΘΠ** (Note: This entire 5-chapter national fraternity, including Cornell's Beta chapter, was absorbed into ΒΘΠ in 1879.)
- ΕΚΠ - Epsilon Kappa Pi (local), 188x ?–1888, became ΦΓΔ
- L and J Club - 1895–1913, became ΩΔ (see **ΣΠ**)
- Skull - 1901–1918, became ΦΔΣ
- Bandhu - 1902–1918, became ΦΔΣ
- ΘΛΦ - Theta Lambda Phi, 1903–1912, became ΣΦΕ
- Zodiac - 1904–1936, absorbed into ΑΤΩ after a failed absorption by Beta Kappa
- Cerberus - 1904–1911, became ΦΚΣ
- Cayuga Club - 1905–1910, became ΣΦΣ (see ΤΚΕ) (Note: ΤΚΕ came from several predecessor groups, including Kappa Psi at its 1923 founding, then absorbing the Scorpion Club and most of Sigma Phi Sigma at re-establishment in 1940, according to the Ithacating blog. It appears ΤΚΕ's original Sigma chapter was renamed as Scorpion chapter to note its predecessor group at re-establishment.) (Note: Baird's listing for Sigma Phi Sigma explains that that national fraternity only formed in 1908, four years after the Ithacating blog cites the creation of its Cornell chapter. The Almanac of Fraternities and Sororities solves the mystery, noting that a predecessor group called the Cayuga Club formed in 1905 before merging into ΣΦΣ.) (Note: Baird's notes that "most" of the members of the Cornell Sigma Phi Sigma chapter joined ΤΚΕ.)
- ΩΠΑ - Omega Pi Alpha, 1905–1907, see Nayati (local)
- ΚΨ - Kappa Psi, 1907–1923, local, became ΤΚΕ
- Nayati - 1907–1919, local, became ΔΣΦ
- Obelisk - 1907-1910, local, see ΑΧΡ
- ΦΔΣ Phi Delta Sigma, 1908–1930, became **ΦΚΤ** (Note: There is a discrepancy in the Almanac of Fraternities and Sororities, which has this predecessor group forming in 1918. Likely a typo there. Two earlier groups, Skull and Bandhu, are noted to have become ΦΔΣ.)
- ISWZA - 1908–1913, local, became **ΛΧΑ** (Note: The ISWZA group itself formed from an informal group called Mug and Jug, which appears to have lasted only two or three months.)
- Arts and Science Club - 1908–1922, became ΑΦΔ
- Amphia - 1909-1912, became ΘΧ
- ΒΣ - Beta Sigma (local), 1910–1911, Jewish, became ΠΛΦ
- Βס - Beta Samach, 1910–1920, Jewish, became ΒΣΡ (Note: Name changed from Beta Samach to Beta Sigma Rho in 1920 and again at the merger with Pi Lambda Phi in 1972. After the merger into the Pi Lam chapter in 1972, Pi Lam closed in 1976.)
- ΣΦΣ - Sigma Phi Sigma, 1910–1941, see ΤΚΕ (Note: Baird's listing for Sigma Phi Sigma explains that the national fraternity only formed in 1908, four years after the Ithacating blog cites creation of its Cornell chapter. The Almanac of Fraternities and Sororities solves the mystery, noting that a predecessor group called the Cayuga Club formed in 1905 before merging into ΣΦΣ.) (Note: Baird's notes that "most" of the members of the Cornell Sigma Phi Sigma chapter joined ΤΚΕ.)
- ΦΕΠ - Phi Epsilon Pi, 1911–1970, became **ΖΒΤ**
- Cadeucus - 1911–1914, local, became **ΑΓΡ**
- Eleusis, 1912–1931, local, became ΘΚΝ, (see **ΛΧΑ**).
- ΑΘ - Alpha Theta, 1912–1917, local, became **ΠΚΑ**
- ΟΑΤ - Omicron Alpha Tau, 1912–1934, Jewish, merged with ΤΔΦ (Note: ΟΑΤ was a national Jewish fraternity, founded at Cornell. It was noted (Sanua, p.79) as "the most Jewish of fraternities". Its house kept a kosher kitchen. All chapters closed during the Great Depression; most of these were absorbed by Tau Delta Phi)
- ΦΣΔ - Phi Sigma Delta, 1912–1970, became **ΖΒΤ** (Note: Baird's notes that Cornell's Beta chapter of ΦΣΔ absorbed the young Alpha Iota chapter of Phi Alpha fraternity at the merger of those two fraternities in 1959. This was ten years before ΦΣΔ's merger into ΖΒΤ.)
- ΦΒΔ - Phi Beta Delta, 1912–1918, 1934–1941, Jewish, see ΠΛΦ (Note: The dormant Cornell chapter of Phi Beta Delta was absorbed in 1941 by the older Delta chapter of Pi Lambda Phi, welcoming its alumni into that fraternity.)
- ΩΔ - Omega Delta, 1913–1917, local, became **ΣΠ**
- ΟΣΟ - Omicron Sigma Omicron, 1914–1915, local, became ΘΑ, (see ΔΣΛ) (Note: The small national of Theta Alpha was founded at Syracuse, placing its Beta chapter at Cornell in 1915, which had been a local called Omicron Sigma Omicron)
- ΘΑ - Theta Alpha, 1915–1933, see ΔΣΛ
- ΦΤ - Phi Tau, 1915–1916 (local), Jewish, became **ΑΕΠ** (Note: This local chapter became Beta chapter of ΑΕΠ soon after the establishment of its national at NYU)
- Komos Club - 1916–1921, became **ΠΚΦ**
- ΒΣΡ - Beta Sigma Rho, 1920–1972, Jewish, merged with ΠΛΦ (Note: This was the Alpha chapter of ΒΣΡ. Baird's Manual 20th edition notes that the fraternity's name was changed to ΒΣΡ at the addition of its third chapter at Columbia University in 1919. It is fair to say that ΒΣΡ began in 1910, albeit under the earlier name.)
- Scorpion Club - 1923–1940, became ΤΚΕ
- ΦΔΜ - Phi Delta Mu, 1925–1934, Jewish, see ΦΒΔ (Note: This small national was founded in 1920 at CCNY. Its Zeta chapter at Cornell merged into Phi Beta Delta in 1934 to re-establish ΦΒΔ.)
- ΒΨ - Beta Psi, 1926–1935, dormant, see ΒΚ (Note: This was the Delta Alpha chapter of the fraternity. At dissolution, some members joined Beta Kappa. The December 1934 Omegan newsletter notes that the Alpha chapter of Beta Psi at Illinois had attempted a merger with Alpha Sigma Phi at the demise of its national in 1934.)
- ΣΩΨ - Sigma Omega Psi, c. 1927–1934?, Jewish, see **ΑΕΠ** (Note: Sigma Omega Psi was a small Jewish fraternity that merged in 1940 with the larger Alpha Epsilon Pi. At the time of the merger, Cornell's Phi chapter was dormant, it having been founded sometime after 1923, according to Baird's 10th edition. [the online Baird's Archive pins this somewhere after 1926, considering the fraternity's known chapter order.] Sigma Omega Psi alumni were accepted into ΑΕΠ as a result of the merger.)
- ΘΚΦ - Theta Kappa Phi, 1927–1931, became ΦΚΘ (Note: This was the Theta chapter of θΚΦ during its existence, though its national was later renamed.)
- ΘΚΝ - Theta Kappa Nu, 1931–1939 (NIC), merged into **ΛΧΑ** (Note: Eleusis was founded as a local in 1912, becoming ΘΚΝ in 1931; only a few years later this small national merged with Lambda Chi Alpha.)
- ΒΚ - Beta Kappa, 1934–1936 (NIC), see ΘΧ (Note: The short-lived Alpha Pi chapter of Beta Kappa didn't survive its mid-Depression founding. Six years later, in 1942, this national fraternity merged into Theta Chi, already present on the Cornell campus. As part of the national terms of the merger, Beta Kappa's 56 young alumni were accepted as alumni of Theta Chi. However, the Baird's Archive notes this group, perhaps a portion of its actives only, was absorbed by ΑΤΩ.)
- Cornell Engineering Men - 194x ?–1942, local, became Triangle
- ΚΝ - Kappa Nu, 1951–1963, Jewish, see ΦΣΕ (Note: The Alpha Beta chapter of the small national fraternity Kappa Nu petitioned to join Phi Sigma Epsilon in 1962, having chosen not to participate in Kappa Nu's merger with Phi Epsilon Pi in 1961 as both fraternities (ΚΝ and ΦΕΠ) were then present on the Cornell campus. The resulting Phi Tau chapter of Phi Sigma Epsilon was later released (a second time) when that fraternity merged with Phi Sigma Kappa. National fraternity Phi Epsilon Pi itself later became part of Zeta Beta Tau.)
- ΦΑ - Phi Alpha, 1953–1959, Jewish, merged into ΦΣΔ (see **ΖΒΤ**) (Note: Baird's notes that Cornell's Beta chapter of ΦΣΔ absorbed the young Alpha Iota chapter of Phi Alpha fraternity at the merger of those two fraternities in 1959. This was ten years before ΦΣΔ's merger into ΖΒΤ.)
- ΦΣΕ - Phi Sigma Epsilon, 1963–1985 (NIC), see **ΦΣΚ** and ΘΧ. (Note: Cornell was the only campus where active chapters of both Phi Sigma Kappa and Phi Sigma Epsilon existed at the time of their merger in 1985. Rather than merge the chapters, Phi Sigma Epsilon's Phi Tau chapter was released to seek another national affiliation, and after a search, joined Theta Chi, also in 1985. To explain, two years prior, in 1983, Theta Chi on the campus had lost their charter due to rules violations, as noted in a historical piece from AEPi, accessed June 14, 2017. AEPi's campus history had noted this situation as the former (1983) Theta Chi members had been absorbed en masse into the AEPi chapter on the campus. The new 1985 edition of Theta Chi (from Phi Sigma Epsilon) had no connection to the former Theta Chi chapter but was granted its Lambda Chapter name and occupied its building. Meanwhile, the Alpha Chi Omega sorority occupied the former Phi Sigma Epsilon chapter's former building, according to a local real estate blog at the time, accessed June 14, 2017. As a postscript, Theta Chi was again closed in 1999 due to drug use violations, and a 2003 recolonization attempt was unsuccessful.)
- ΦΔΑ - Phi Delta Alpha, 1970–1973, see **ΦΔΘ** (Note: Formed as a continuation of ΦΔΘ at its 1970 closure, this group successfully re-emerged three years later to re-join the parent fraternity.)

=== Dormant chapters ===
- ΚΑ - Kappa Alpha Society, 1868–1990, 2007–2018 (NIC) (Note: Baird's 5th ed. notes this chapter began "at the opening of the University in (~Fall of) 1868"; it has traditionally been listed as the third society formed on the campus.)
- ΧΦ - Chi Phi, Xi Chapter, 1868–1881, 1888–2024 (NIC). Suspended since November 2024 after allegations of druggings and sexual assault. University-owned house at 107 Edgemoor Lane
- ΑΩ - Alpha Omega, 1868–1870, local
- ΦΚΨ - Phi Kappa Psi, 1869–1877, 1885–2020 (NIC). University-owned house at 120 Mary Ann Wood Drive. Indefinitely suspended following the death of Antonio Tsialas.
- ΘΔΧ - Theta Delta Chi, Beta Charge, 1870-1999, 2003–2023 (NIC). Agreed to withdrawal of recognition for at least three years, effective fall 2023, for violations of social event policy
- ΣΔΠ - Sigma Delta Pi (Vitruvian), 1871–1874 (Note: This small, now-dormant national was formed at Dartmouth in 1858, also known by the name Vitruvian. Its Beta chapter was placed at Cornell. Not to be confused with the Spanish language honor society of the same name.)
- ΨΥ - Psi Upsilon, 1876–2016 (NIC) University-owned house at 2 Forest Park Lane. (Note: This chapter originated as ΦΚΨ, vacating that original chapter in 1876, long before the formation of the NIC and rules against such "poaching". ΦΚΨ would return a decade later. Both groups were stable on the Cornell campus for well over a century.)
- ΘΝΕ - Theta Nu Epsilon, 1877–1913 (Note: The 1889/90 Cornellian yearbook notes ΘΝΕ without a founding date. This is in keeping with the affected secrecy of the group. Somewhat of a pariah, it was rejected by the NIC early in its life because of fears of membership drain of sophomores from other societies and behavioral issues. Sometime after Cornell's Delta chapter of the fraternity died, the national made efforts to reform and was eventually admitted into the NIC. Active dates from the Theta Nu Epsilon Wikipedia page.)
- ΔΒΦ - Delta Beta Phi, 1878–1882. Alpha chapter of this small, short-lived national.
- ΑΤΩ - Alpha Tau Omega, 1887–2013 (NIC) (Note: ΑΤΩ's address, before its 2013 closing, was 625 University Ave., Ithaca, NY 14850)
- Q.T.V. - 1888–1889 (Note: Q.T.V. was the only Greek society whose esoteric name used Latin letters.)
- ΣΦ - Sigma Phi, New York-Epsilon chapter, 1890–2025 (NIC); suspended through at least 2027 for misconduct. University-owned house at 1 Forest Park Lane.
- ΔΦ - Delta Phi, 1891–2018, 2022–25 (NIC). Commonly known as "Llenroc," the house at 100 Cornell Ave. originally built for Ezra Cornell, which the chapter acquired in 1911, Delta Phi was suspended in 2025 for five years for hazing and other violations.
- ΠΛΦ - Pi Lambda Phi, 1896–1901, 1911–1976 (NIC) (Note: The original Pi Lambda Phi chapter was short-lived, existing from 1897 to 1901. It was restored with the assimilation of a local, coincidently named Beta Sigma, that had formed the year prior in 1910. This earlier local had no organizational connection with the later-developed Beta Sigma Rho. In 1972, these two Cornell chapters would themselves merge when Beta Sigma Rho national was absorbed by Pi Lambda Phi.)
- ΘΞ - Theta Xi, 1903–1970, 2008–2010, (NIC) (Note: Theta Xi chose to disband in 2010. It had targeted transfer students since its recolonization in 2007.)
- ΔΣΦ - Delta Sigma Phi, Theta chapter, 1907–1943 (NIC)
- ΑΧΡ - Alpha Chi Rho, 1908–1971, 1976–1980, 1992–199x ? (NIC) (Note: This chapter originated two years prior in a local club formed with the unfortunate name Swastika in 1906. Adopting this ancient symbol was a coincidence; the group had no relation to the later national socialist party of Germany. In 1910, the young ΑΧΡ chapter absorbed another local club called Obelisk, formed in 1907.)
- Huntington Club - 1911–1922+, local, Episcopal affinity (Note: Noted in remarks by Acting President Crane, two years after the group's inception. The Huntington Club was named after an important bishop of the church and already had 34 residents at its first home, the former Court Inn, on Dryden Road. staff (1913).)
- ΦΚΣ - Phi Kappa Sigma, 1911–1991 (NIC)
- ΘΧ - Theta Chi, 1912-1983, 1985–1999 (NIC) (Note: The short-lived Alpha Pi chapter of Beta Kappa didn't survive its mid-Depression founding. Six years later, in 1942, this national fraternity merged into Theta Chi, already present on the Cornell campus. As part of the national terms of the merger, Beta Kappa's 56 young alumni were accepted as alumni of Theta Chi. However, the Baird's Archive notes this group, perhaps a portion of its actives only, was absorbed by ΑΤΩ.) (Note: Cornell was the only campus where active chapters of both Phi Sigma Kappa and Phi Sigma Epsilon existed at the time of their merger in 1985. Rather than merge the chapters, Phi Sigma Epsilon's Phi Tau chapter was released to seek another national affiliation, and after a search, joined Theta Chi, also in 1985. To explain, two years prior, in 1983, Theta Chi on the campus had lost their charter due to rules violations, as noted in a historical piece from AEPi, accessed June 14, 2017. AEPi's campus history had noted this situation as the former (1983) Theta Chi members had been absorbed en masse into the AEPi chapter on the campus. The new 1985 edition of Theta Chi (from Phi Sigma Epsilon) had no connection to the former Theta Chi chapter but was granted its Lambda Chapter name and occupied its building. Meanwhile, Alpha Chi Omega sorority occupied the former Phi Sigma Epsilon chapter's former building, according to a local real estate blog Theta Chi was again closed in 1999 due to drug use violations, and a 2003 recolonization attempt was unsuccessful.)
- ΣΦΕ - Sigma Phi Epsilon, 1912–2005, 2006–2019 (NIC)
- ΤΕΦ - Tau Epsilon Phi, 1913–1932, 1939–2012 (NIC)
- Philos Club - 1914–1917, local
- ΣΥ - Sigma Upsilon, 1915–1933, local
- ΦΔΠ - Phi Delta Pi, 1916–1926, Jewish (Note: This small, now-dormant national was formed in New York for graduate students in 1913, placing its Beta chapter at Cornell. Not to be confused with a fraternity formed at Eastern Michigan University under the same name.)
- ΑΕΠ - Alpha Epsilon Pi, 1917–1976, 1978–2001?, 2005–2023 (NIC). Agreed to the withdrawal of recognition for at least three years, effective fall 2023, for violations of social event policy
- ΑΦΔ - Alpha Phi Delta, 1922–1968, 2012–2018 (NIC) (Note: ΑΦΔ was non-residential as of 2016. ΑΦΔ's Mu chapter is no longer recognized by Cornell IFC as of January 20, 2019.)
- ΤΚΕ - Tau Kappa Epsilon, 1923-1934, 1940–2012, 2018–2020 (Note: Baird's Manual names this chapter the Scorpion chapter of that fraternity, indicating the Scorpion local's role as the primary of several groups that merged to form ΤΚΕ at Cornell at its re-establishment in 1940.)
- ΦΚΘ - Phi Kappa Theta, 1927–1931 (NIC) (Note: This chapter had been the Theta chapter of Theta Kappa Phi during its brief active tenure. It kept that chapter name as a dormant chapter at the time of the merger with Phi Kappa Theta in 1959.)
- ΔΣΛ - Delta Sigma Lambda, 1933–1936 (DeMolay affiliated) (Note: Delta Sigma Lambda absorbed the two remaining chapters of Theta Alpha in 1933, including Cornell's Beta chapter, which was renamed Lambda chapter of the larger fraternity, but the chapter at Cornell died, in 1935 or 1936 and no later than 1937, at the demise of the entire national.)
- ΤΔΦ - Tau Delta Phi, Tau Beta chapter, 1934–1971 (NIC), Jewish
- Triangle, 1942–1985 (NIC)
- ΑΓΣ - Alpha Gamma Sigma, 1972–199x (NIC), agricultural focus
- ΣΧΔ - Sigma Chi Delta, 1981–2020 co-ed local (Note: ΣΧΔ was non-residential in 2016)
- ΑΛΜ - Alpha Lambda Mu, Gamma chapter, 2014–2020 (Note: ΑΛΜ is non-residential as of 2019.)

=== Other ===
Two former IFC members withdrew from the council but remain active as residential societies on the Cornell campus. The Seal and Serpent Society, founded in 1905 and one of the oldest local fraternities in continuous existence, withdrew from the IFC in 2016 with the support of its alumni and the university. It is registered as an independent student organization and maintains its historic house at 305 Thurston Avenue. In 2020, the house voted to become gender-neutral.

The Cornell chapter of the mixed-gender agricultural professional fraternity Alpha Zeta (AZ), founded in 1901, disaffiliated from the IFC in 2020. It continues to maintain its house at 214 Thurston Avenue.

== Panhellenic Council ==
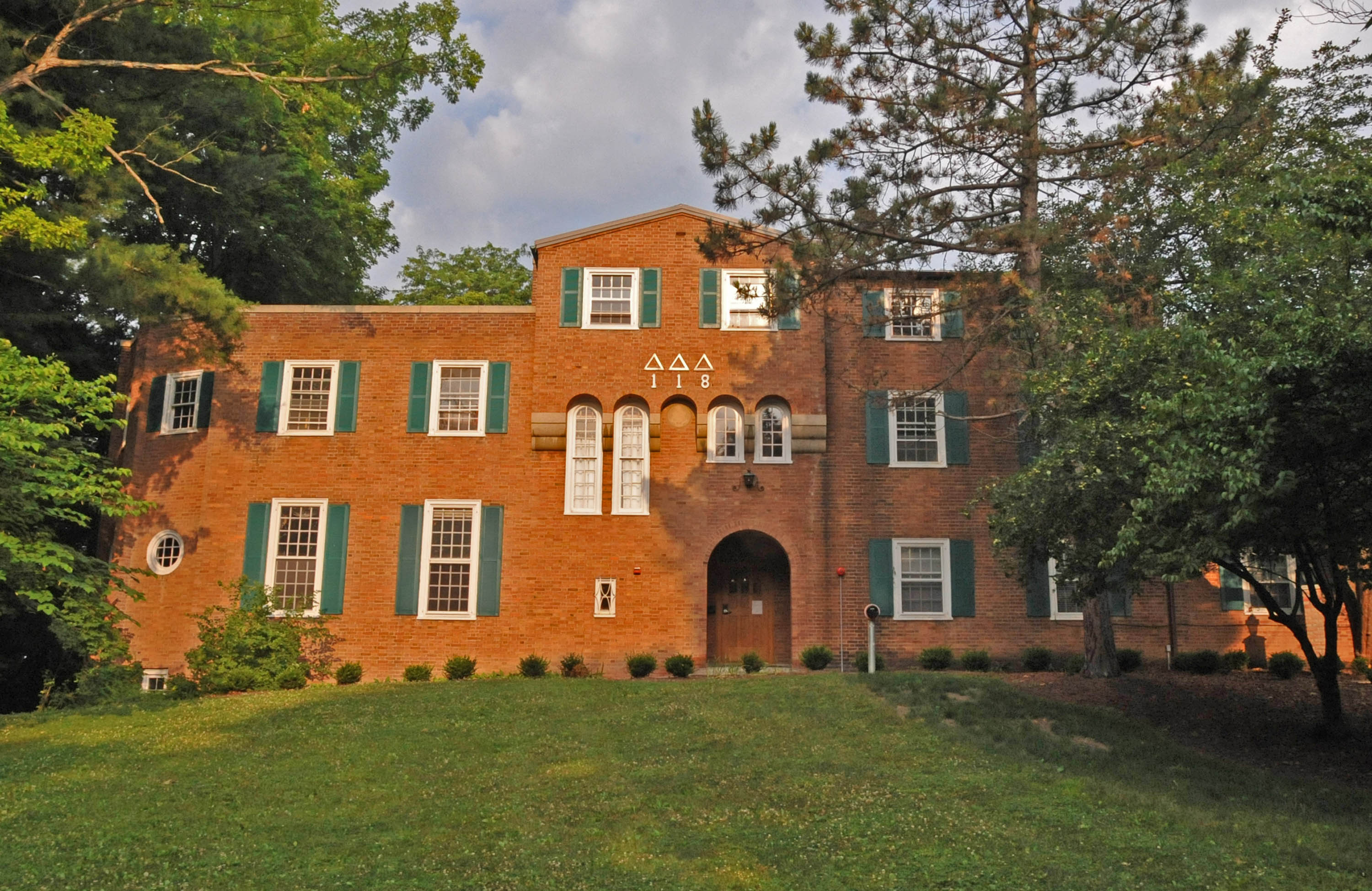
Delta Delta Delta sorority house

Sororities constituting the Panhellenic Council (PHC) are listed with dates of local founding and national conference membership, these are women's organizations voluntarily coordinating their efforts within the PHC. As part of PHC or national organization self-governance, or University disciplinary action, chapters may be suspended ("de-recognized") or closed for a time. If a chapter is closed and/or forfeits its housing, it will be listed as a dormant chapter. Active groups are in bold, and dormant groups are in italics. See the Office of Student Life for current PHA members.

NPC indicates members of the National Panhellenic Conference.

=== Active chapters ===
Organization	Symbols	Chapter	Chapter date and range	Affiliation	Chapter house address	Ref.
Kappa Alpha Theta	ΚΑΘ	Iota	1881–1965, 1980	NPC	519 Stewart Avenue	(Note: ΚΑΘ disaffiliated 1881 to 1965, becoming Prospect of Whitby cooperative during that time. ΚΑΘ re-founded in 1980 with no association with the former organization.)
Kappa Kappa Gamma	ΚΚΓ	Psi Deuteron	1883–1969, 1977	NPC	508 Thurston Avenue	(Note: The chapter continued as an independent, ΚΚΨ, while ΚΚΓ was 'dormant' 1969-1977)
Delta Gamma	ΔΓ	Chi	1885	NPC	117 Triphammer Road	
Alpha Phi	ΑΦ	Delta	1889–1997, 1998	NPC	411 Thurston Avenue	
Pi Beta Phi	ΠΒΦ	NY Delta	1892–1893, 1919	NPC	330 Triphammer Road	(Note: From 1892 to 1893, this chapter was named NY Alpha chapter.)
Delta Delta Delta	ΔΔΔ	Alpha Beta	1913	NPC	118 Triphammer Road	
Kappa Delta	ΚΔ	Omega Chi	1917–1969, 1975	NPC	109 Triphammer Road	
Sigma Delta Tau	ΣΔΤ	Alpha	1917	NPC	115 Ridgewood Road	
Alpha Xi Delta	ΑΞΔ	Alpha Beta	1918–1964, 2005	NPC	40 Ridgewood Road	
Alpha Epsilon Phi	ΑΕΦ	Kappa	1920–1971, 197x ?	NPC	435 Wyckoff Avenue	
Alpha Chi Omega	ΑΧΩ	Zeta Phi	1984	NPC	210 Thurston Avenue	

=== Chapters with name changes ===
- Sennightly, 1895–1913, became **ΔΔΔ**
- ΩΧ - Omega Chi, 1916–1917, local, became **ΚΔ**
- ΦΚ - Phi Kappa, 1916–1917, local, became **ΧΩ**
- ΔΠΑ - Delta Pi Alpha, 1916–1918, local, became **ΑΞΔ**
- ΣΔΦ - Sigma Delta Phi, 1917–1919, local, became **ΣΔΤ**
- ΧΓ - Chi Gamma, 1920–1921, 1956–1964, local, became **ΣΚ**
- ΣΚ - Sigma Kappa, 1921–1956 (NPC), reverted to local **ΧΓ**
- ΚΚΨ - Kappa Kappa Psi, 1969–1977, local, re-formed as **ΚΚΓ**

=== Dormant chapters ===
- ΑΟΠ - Alpha Omicron Pi, 1908–1962, 1989–2008 (NPC)
- ΔΖ - Delta Zeta, 1908–1932 (NPC)
- ΧΩ - Chi Omega, 1917–1963, 1987–2003 (NPC)
- ΣΚ - Sigma Kappa, 1921–1956 (NPC)
- ΦΣΣ - Phi Sigma Sigma, Beta Xi chapter, 1954–1969, 2011–2023 (NPC)
- ΔΦΕ - Delta Phi Epsilon, 1960–1988, 1994–2003 (NPC)
- ΙΑΠ - Iota Alpha Pi, 1966–1967 (NPC), disbanded nationally 1971
- ΑΓΔ - Alpha Gamma Delta, 1985–1996 (NPC)
- ΦΜ - Phi Mu, 2014–2021 (NPC)

== Multicultural Greek and Fraternal Council ==
Sororities and Fraternities constituting the Multicultural Greek and Fraternal Council (MGFC) were originally affiliated with specific ethnicities or languages. Most of these organizations are now fully integrated, as are the rest of Cornell's Greek letter organizations. All MGFC chapters are. Listed with dates of local founding and national conference membership, these are men's and women's organizations that voluntarily coordinate their efforts within the MGFC. As part of MGFC or University self-governance during disciplinary action, chapters may be suspended ("de-recognized") for a time. Unless the suspensions result in long-term closure of the chapter or forfeiture of a building, they should not be removed from this list. Active groups are in bold, and dormant groups are in italics. See the Office of Student Life for current MGFC members. The inter-Greek councils often cooperate on programs and policies, as do individual chapters from among the several Greek councils.

NALFO indicates members of the National Association of Latino Fraternal Organizations;
NAPA indicates members of the National APIDA Panhellenic Association;
NPHC indicates members of the National Pan-Hellenic Council.

=== Men's fraternities ===
- **ΑΦΑ** - Alpha Phi Alpha, 1906 (NPHC, NIC)
- **ΚΑΨ** - Kappa Alpha Psi, 1978 (NPHC, NIC)
- **ΦΒΣ** - Phi Beta Sigma, 1979 (NPHC, formerly NIC)
- **ΛΥΛ** - Lambda Upsilon Lambda, 1982 (NALFO)
- **ΠΔΨ** - Pi Delta Psi, 1998 (NAPA)
- **ΛΦΕ** - Lambda Phi Epsilon, 1999 (NAPA, NIC)

=== Women's fraternities and sororities ===
- **ΔΣΘ** - Delta Sigma Theta, 1975 (NPHC)
- **ΛΠΧ** - Lambda Pi Chi, 1988 (NALFO)
- **ΣΓΡ** - Sigma Gamma Rho, 1990 (NPHC)
- **ΣΛΥ** - Sigma Lambda Upsilon, 1993 (NALFO)
- **αΚΔΦ** - alpha Kappa Delta Phi, 1997 (NAPA)
- **ΚΦΛ** - Kappa Phi Lambda, 2000 (NAPA)
- **ΖΦΒ** - Zeta Phi Beta, 2019 (NPHC)

=== Chapters with name changes ===
- Su Ye She, 1916–1917, Chinese men's group, see Rho Psi
- Club Hispania, 1929–1931, local Hispanic men's group, see Phi Lambda Alpha
- ΦΛΑ - Phi Lambda Alpha, 1931–1931, Hispanic men's group, see Phi Iota Alpha (Note: This organization merged twice in 1931. The original Club Hispania joined Phi Lambda Alpha, and that fraternity nationally merged into Phi Iota Alpha in late December of that same year, according to Phi Iota Alpha records.)

=== Dormant chapters ===
- ΑΖ - Alpha Zeta, 1890–1894, Hispanic men's group. (Note: The first "International Latino Fraternity" was founded at Cornell, with the establishment of Alpha Chapter of Alpha Zeta, not to be confused with the Professional (Agricultural) fraternity of that same name, also on the Cornell campus. While short-lived, this group sparked many imitators, as noted by Oliver Fajardo)
- ΡΨ - Rho Psi, 1917–1931, Chinese men's group, no longer active at the collegiate level. (Note: ΡΨ, for Chinese students, was founded at Cornell in 1916 with the Chinese name Su Ye She, at a time when Chinese students were unable to join other fraternities. It became a national organization in 1925 and international in 1929. The Cornell chapter ceased in 1931, but other chapters of the national organization continued, becoming co-educational in 1975. Rho Psi continues elsewhere as a Chinese interest club. The fraternity adopted the name Rho Psi Society, indicating its co-educational status, also in 1975.)
- ΦΙΑ - Phi Iota Alpha, 1931–1940? (NALFO, NIC), men's group (Note: This organization merged twice in 1931. The original Club Hispania joined Phi Lambda Alpha, and that fraternity nationally merged into Phi Iota Alpha in late December of that same year, according to Phi Iota Alpha records.)
- ΑΚΑ - Alpha Kappa Alpha, 1937–1940, 1952–2018 (NPHC), women's group, dormant.
- ΩΨΦ - Omega Psi Phi, 1982–2019, (NPHC), men's group, dormant
- ΛΘΦ - Lambda Theta Phi, 1995-2018 (NALFO, NIC), men's group, dormant.
- ΩΦΒ - Omega Phi Beta, 1999–2017 (NALFO), women's group, dormant.
- ΦΘΧ - Phi Theta Chi, 199x–20xx?, Latina, women's group (Note: This national sorority, founded at Binghamton University, is dormant.)
- ΧΥΣ - Chi Upsilon Sigma, 2003–20xx ? (NALFO), women's group, dormant.
- ΛΘΑ - Lambda Theta Alpha, 2004–2019 (NALFO), women's group, dormant.
- ΙΦΘ - Iota Phi Theta, 2005-–20xx ? (NPHC, NIC), men's group, dormant.
- MALIK, 2015–2022, men's group, dormant.

== Honor, professional, and service societies ==
These organizations have a similarly long pedigree on the Cornell campus but are largely non-residential. Members of the social and academic fraternities and sororities may join or be asked to join, as may non-Greek students. Multiple affiliations are allowable. The cut-off line where any campus organization falls within these headings or without is somewhat arbitrary; those formed before 1990 are listed under these subheadings in various volumes of the Baird's Manual of American College Fraternities, which for more than a century has been the data source of record for such organizations. Newer groups have been placed in categories that match Baird's categories. The latest edition of Baird's was published before the national development of some of the societies here, and therefore, position and inclusion are, in some cases, assumptive.

=== Honor and recognition societies ===
Honor societies recognize students who excel academically or as leaders among their peers, often within a specific academic discipline. Many honor societies invite students to become members based on scholastic rank (the top x% of a class) and/or grade point, either overall or for classes taken within the discipline for which the honor society provides recognition. In cases where academic achievement would not be an appropriate criterion for membership, other standards are usually required for membership (such as completion of a particular ceremony or training program). These societies recognize past achievements. Pledging is not required, and new candidates may be immediately inducted into membership after meeting predetermined academic criteria and paying a one-time membership fee. Because of their recognition purpose, most honor societies will have much higher academic achievement requirements for membership than professional societies. It is also common for a scholastic honor society to add a criterion relating to the student's character. Some honor societies are invitation-only, while others allow unsolicited applications. Finally, membership in an honor society might be considered exclusive, i.e., a member of such an organization cannot join other honor societies representing the same field. Governance varies from faculty-guided to purely student-run.

Listed by date of local founding with national conference membership, these are co-ed, non-residential, achievement-based organizations that self-select members based on published criteria.

==== Active chapters ====
ACHS indicates members of the Association of College Honor Societies.

- ΦΒΚ - Phi Beta Kappa, 1882, academic honors
- ΣΞ - Sigma Xi, 1886, graduate science & engineering honors
- ΦΔΦ - Phi Delta Phi, 1888, law honors
- Sphinx Head Society, 1890, local, character, leadership and service
- Der Hexenkreis, 1892, local, character, leadership and service (Note: The Cornell local Der Hexenkreis was a founder of Mortar Board nationally, however, the Cornell chapter, which never relinquished its historical roots as a 130-year-old society recently left Mortar Board and reclaimed independence as a strictly Cornellian society)
- Quill and Dagger, 1893, local, character, leadership and service
- Scabbard and Blade, 1906 (ACHS), military
- ΑΩΑ - Alpha Omega Alpha, 1910, graduate medical honors
- ΤΒΠ - Tau Beta Pi, 1910 (ACHS), engineering honors
- ΗΚΝ - Eta Kappa Nu, 1912, electrical engineering, computer engineering honors
- Order of the Coif, 1914, law school graduates honors
- ΚΟΝ - Kappa Omicron Nu, 1919 (ACHS), humanities honors
- Ye Hosts, 1926, local, hotel administration honors, service
- ΠΑΞ - Pi Alpha Xi, 1923, horticulture honors
- ΑΚΔ - Alpha Kappa Delta, 1925 (ACHS), sociology honors
- ΦΖ - Phi Zeta, 1925, graduate veterinary medicine honors
- ΧΕ - Chi Epsilon, 1925 (ACHS), civil engineering honors
- ΔΦΑ - Delta Phi Alpha, 1933, German honors (Note: For a time, Baird's had noted this chapter as inactive, however as of November 2021 it's back on the national website. Reactivation for most honor societies only requires a faculty sponsor.)
- ΠΔΦ - Pi Delta Phi, 1936 (ACHS), French honors
- Block and Bridle, 1937, animal livestock honors
- ΑΕΔ - Alpha Epsilon Delta, 1946 (ACHS), pre-health honors
- ΠΤΣ - Pi Tau Sigma, 1948 (ACHS), mechanical engineering honors
- ΨΧ - Psi Chi, 1948 (ACHS), psychology honors
- ΠΜΕ - Pi Mu Epsilon, 1953, mathematics honors
- ΦΤΣ - Phi Tau Sigma, 1957, food science and technology honors
- ΟΔΕ - Omicron Delta Epsilon, 1961 (ACHS), economics honors
- ΣΘΤ - Sigma Theta Tau, 1968 (ACHS), nursing honors
- ΣΔΠ - Sigma Delta Pi, 1975 (ACHS), Spanish and Portuguese honors
- Order of Omega, 1979, Greek society leadership honors
- Golden Key International Honour Society, 1989, high achievement in academics, leadership & service
- ΦΣΠ - Phi Sigma Pi, 1994, scholastic and leadership honors
- ΩΡ - Omega Rho, 1995 (ACHS), operations research, management science honors
- ΑΕ - Alpha Epsilon, 1998 (ACHS), agricultural, food, and biological engineering honors
- NSCS - National Society of Collegiate Scholars, 1999 (ACHS), high achievement
- ΛΠΗ - Lambda Pi Eta, 2001 (ACHS), communications honors
- ΠΣΑ - Pi Sigma Alpha. 2003 (ACHS), political science honors
- ΒΓΣ - Beta Gamma Sigma, 2004 (ACHS), business academic honors
- ΠΑΑ - Pi Alpha Alpha, 2006 (ACHS), public administration honors
- Red Key Society, 2007, local, Athletics and community-building honors
- NRHH - National Residence Hall Honorary, 2007, residence hall leadership honors
- ΔΑΠ - Delta Alpha Pi, 2012, high achievement with disabilities
- Irving Literary Society, 1868–1887, restarted 2014, local, literary honors
- AAS - Arnold Air Society, 19xx ?, Air Force cadet honors

==== Dormant chapters ====
ACHS indicates members of the Association of College Honor Societies.

- Aleph Samach, 1893–1983+, junior class men's honors, dormant.
- Chancery, 1890-1980 ?, senior law honors, dormant.[1][2]
- Raven and Serpent, <1896–1983+, junior class women's honors, dormant.
- ΔΣΡ-ΤΚΑ - Delta Sigma Rho-Tau Kappa Alpha, 1911–1999 ?, forensics honor, dormant?
- Mortar Board, 1918–2021, senior class scholarship, leadership and service honors, (see Der Hexenkreis)
- ΦΚΦ - Phi Kappa Phi, 1920–1979, 1983–2013, honors, all disciplines, dormant
- ΣΓΕ - Sigma Gamma Epsilon, 1921–1965, earth sciences honors, dormant
- ΠΕΔ - National Collegiate Players or Pi Epsilon Delta, 1960–19xx ?, theater honors, national disbanded
- ΑΛΔ - Alpha Lambda Delta, 1961–1986, (ACHS) freshmen honors, dormant
- ΦΗΣ - Phi Eta Sigma, 1961–1973, freshman honors, dormant
- ΑΠΜ - Alpha Pi Mu, 1968–1972 (ACHS), industrial engineering honors, dormant
- ΠΣΑ - Pi Sigma Alpha. 2003–20xx ? (ACHS), political science honors, dormant?

=== Professional societies ===
Professional societies work to build friendship bonds among members, cultivate their strengths so that they may promote their profession, and provide mutual assistance in their shared areas of professional study.

Listed by date of local founding with national conference membership, these are primarily co-ed and non-residential organizations of an array of professional interests. Membership in a professional fraternity may be the result of a pledge process, much like a social fraternity, and members are expected to remain loyal and active in the life organization. Within the group of societies dedicated to a professional field of study, for example, law societies, membership is exclusive; however, these societies may initiate members who belong to other types of fraternities. Professional Societies are known for networking and post-collegiate involvement. Governance varies from faculty-managed to purely student-run.

Active chapters

PFA indicates members of the Professional Fraternity Association

- ΓΑ - Gamma Alpha, 1899 biological science graduate students (co-op)
- ΦΔΕ - Phi Delta Epsilon, 1904 (PFA), medical
- ΑΨ - Alpha Psi, 1907, veterinary medicine, (residential)
- ΩΤΣ - Omega Tau Sigma, 1911 (PFA), veterinary (residential)
- ΑΧΣ - Alpha Chi Sigma, 1913 (PFA), chemistry (residential)
- ΣΔΕ - Sigma Delta Epsilon or GWIS, 1921, graduate women in science
- ΦΑΔ - Phi Alpha Delta, 1925 (PFA), pre-law
- ΦΣΠ - Phi Sigma Pi, 1994 (PFA), leadership and scholarship
- ΑΚΨ - Alpha Kappa Psi, 1998 (PFA), business
- ΣΑ - Sigma Alpha, 2002 (PFA), women's, agriculture
- ΔΣΠ - Delta Sigma Pi, 2004 (PFA), business
- ΦΓΝ - Phi Gamma Nu, 2008 (PFA), business
- ΠΛΣ - Pi Lambda Sigma, 2017, government
- ΠΣΕ - Pi Sigma Epsilon, 2011 (PFA), sales and marketing
- ΚΑΠ - Kappa Alpha Pi, 2011, pre-law
- ΘΤ - Theta Tau, 2012 (PFA), engineering
- ΦΧΘ - Phi Chi Theta, 2017 (PFA), business
- ΦΒΛ - Phi Beta Lambda-FBLA, 19xx ?, business

Dormant chapters

PFA indicates members of the Professional Fraternity Association

- ΝΣΝ - Nu Sigma Nu, 1900–19xx ?. medical professional, national disbanded
- ΑΚΚ - Alpha Kappa Kappa, 1901–1941, medical professional, national disbanded
- ΑΕΙ - Alpha Epsilon Iota, 1901–1913, medical professional, national disbanded
- ΔΘΦ - Delta Theta Phi, 1903–1953 (PFA), law, dormant
- ΓΗΓ - Gamma Eta Gamma, 1909–1918, law, dormant
- ΣΔΧ - Sigma Delta Chi, 1920–1959, [now SPJ] journalism, dormant
- ΦΧ - Phi Chi, 1921–1956, medical, dormant
- ΚΒΠ - Kappa Beta Pi, 1921–1939 (PFA), was women's legal, dormant
- ΦΛΚ - Phi Lambda Kappa, 1928–1947?, medical, dormant
- ΚΔΕ - Kappa Delta Epsilon, 1933–1960 (PFA), education, dormant
- ΚΦΚ - Kappa Phi Kappa, 1934–1956, education, dormant
- ΦΔΓ - Phi Delta Gamma, 1940–1953, women graduate students, dormant

=== Service societies ===
Service societies are listed with dates of local founding and national conference membership, if any; these are non-residential, co-ed organizations designed to provide campus and community service. These organizations are self-governed.

- ΑΦΩ - Alpha Phi Omega, 1927 (PFA), service
- Greeks Go Green, 20xx ?, local, environmentalism

== Building and property ownership ==
=== Cornell University Residence Plan of 1966 ===
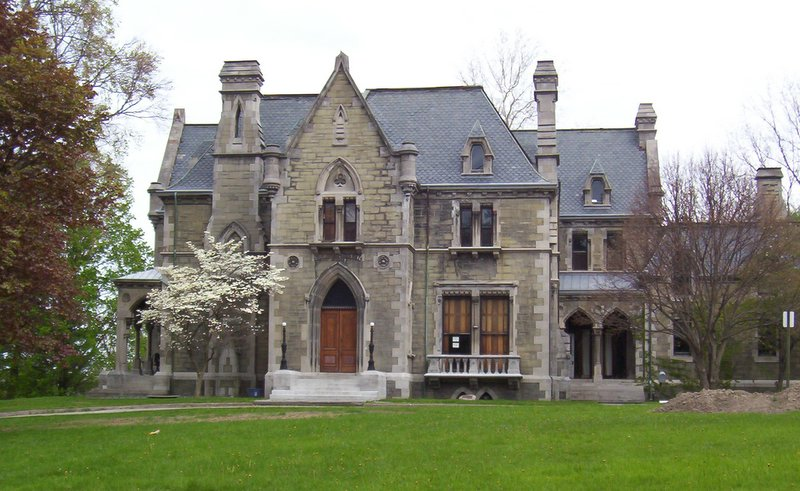
The Delta Phi fraternity house at Cornell

During the 1948–49 school year, then-Cornell University President Edmund Ezra Day formally distanced the university leadership from the increased discrimination that he had observed at Cornell since 1910. His speech at the time marked the beginning of an effort to end such unlawful practices, a goal to which the University remains committed. Following hearings into discrimination within Cornell's system of private fraternities and sororities, fifteen fraternities liquidated private holdings and entered into the Cornell University Residence Plan of 1966, or CURP'66, an agreement which required all signatories to refrain from unlawful discrimination. The majority of CURP ’66 houses are on the Cornell West Campus. The plan created a system of 'living and learning' in small residences.

Each Group House was to be maintained by a Priority Group electing its Group Sponsor. Phi Kappa Psi, for instance, sponsored Group House No. IV d/b/a/ The Irving Literary Society, and developed its parcel on West Campus. Cornell desired an academic atmosphere in student residence “units,” providing appropriate facilities for intellectual and cultural activities and encouraging student participation in these pursuits. CURP ’66 was not simply the creation of University-owned fraternities and sororities but a plan to provide a supplement to the University-maintained dormitory complex, the existing Cornell Greek System, off-campus apartments, and rooming houses. The vision was to organize “Small Residences” together, regardless of their national or local orientation, as fraternities or cooperatives. The University program provided for no discrimination based on race, creed, color, or national origin. The issue of gender was addressed in the equal promotion of female, male, and gender-neutral Group Houses. In 1997, Cornell's president, Hunter Rawlings, reaffirmed the Board of Trustees' commitment to the Cornell University Residence Plan of 1966.

The current CURP ’66 was created from an existing University leasing system dating to the 1881 decision by Andrew Dickson White to favor fraternities over dormitories. White thought fraternities “’[would] arouse in the students a feeling of responsibility both for the care of the property and for the reputation of the house . . . [and] fastens upon [students’] duties and responsibilities similar to those of men in the active world was among the better solutions of the problems [of] . . . students in American universities.’” White’s vision, in turn, developed from the professional analysis of American architect and planner, Frederick Law Olmsted, who saw the erection of residential clubhouses on Morrill Land-Grant Colleges Act as a reform over the barracks-like dormitories used by existing American universities and colleges. Like White, Olmsted felt clubhouses maintained by the students would form part of the educational experience. They were to be modeled on the typical rural household of the era, small country villas thought to avoid the negative aspects of the Industrial Revolution.

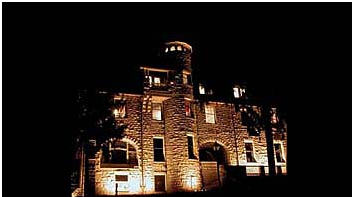
The Delta Kappa Epsilon fraternity house at Cornell

CURP signatories

- Group House No. I, possessed by Delta Kappa Epsilon, signatory since 1960, 13 South Avenue (in residence)
- Group House No. II, possessed by Delta Tau Delta, signatory since June 8, 1960, 104 Mary Ann Wood Drive (in residence)
- Group House No. III, Chi Phi ("Craigielea"), signatory since November 15, 1960, 107 Edgemoor Lane; unoccupied since 2025
- Group House No. IV, "Ivy," possessed by Phi Kappa Psi ("The Gables"), signatory since November 30, 1959, 525 Stewart Avenue, service deliveries to 120 Mary Ann Wood Drive; Phi Psi is also the successor organization to the Irving Literary Society. First to sign in to the revised Group Housing Plan in 1959, it was fourth in accession due to negotiations over the sale of its property at 312 Thurston Avenue, the former Wyckoff Mansion. In 2022, after the undergraduate chapter had been dismissed, the alumni association sued the university over the future use of the house, and the property has remained in litigation since.
- Group House No. V, possessed by Sigma Phi Epsilon, signatory since 1962, 109 McGraw Place. Used as a university residence hall since 2019
- Group House No. VI, possessed by Delta Upsilon, signatory since 1962, 6 South Avenue (in residence)
- Group House No. VII, occupied by Sigma Alpha Mu, and formerly possessed by Kappa Alpha Society, which was a signatory in 1991 (signing was delayed for three decades, for reasons unknown)
- Group House No. VIII, possessed by Zeta Psi, signatory since 1963, 534 Thurston Avenue (in residence)
- Group House No. IX (demolished 2020), formerly possessed by Chi Omega, signatory since 1963, 10 Sisson Place; later occupied by Sigma Alpha Mu
- Group House X, occupied by University Residence Life, 201 Thurston Avenue, and formerly possessed by Lambda Upsilon Lambda, signatory since 1965 when the CURP program was closed out in favor of a return to individual leasing.

=== Chapters with university-owned facilities under other agreements ===
The Cornell University Residence Plan of 1966 was based on agreements with other institutions, dating from 1933 to 1952 and after 1965:

- Kappa Alpha Theta, 519 Stewart Ave
- Psi Upsilon, 2 Forest Park Ln
- Sigma Phi, 1 Forest Park Ln
- Kappa Sigma, 600 University Avenue
- Phi Gamma Delta ("The Oaks"), 118 McGraw Pl
- Sigma Alpha Epsilon ("Hillcrest"), 122 McGraw Pl

The university-owned property at 722 University Avenue was also leased to several Greek-letter groups, including Pi Kappa Phi, Alpha Gamma Delta, Alpha Chi Rho, Alpha Epsilon Phi, and finally Lambda Upsilon Lambda, which vacated in 2006. The house was demolished in 2017.

=== Chapters with privately owned facilities ===
Many fraternities and sororities have remained outside the ambit of University ownership. As of October 2017, these chapters include the following:

- Acacia (“Northcote”), 318 Highland Rd
- Alpha Chi Omega, 210 Thurston Ave
- Alpha Delta Phi, 777 Stewart Ave
- Alpha Epsilon Phi, 435 Wyckoff Rd
- Alpha Epsilon Pi (“Thurston Manor”), 140 Thurston Ave
- Alpha Gamma Rho, 203 Highland Ave
- Alpha Phi, 411 Thurston Ave
- Alpha Phi Alpha (“House of Alpha”), 105 Westbourne Ln
- Alpha Sigma Phi (“Rockledge”), 804 Stewart Ave
- Alpha Tau Omega, 625 University Ave
- Alpha Xi Delta, 40 Ridgewood Rd
- Alpha Zeta, 214 Thurston Ave
- Beta Theta Pi (“Castle on the Rock”), 100 Ridgewood Rd
- Chi Psi, 810 University Ave
- Delta Chi (“The Knoll”), 102 The Knoll
- Delta Delta Delta, 118 Triphammer Rd
- Delta Gamma, 117 Triphammer Rd
- Delta Phi (“Llenroc”), 100 Cornell Ave
- Kappa Alpha Theta, 519 Stewart Ave
- Kappa Delta, 109 Triphammer Rd
- Kappa Delta Rho, 312 Highland Rd
- Kappa Kappa Gamma, 508 Thurston Ave
- Lambda Chi Alpha (“Edgemoor”), 125 Edgemoor Ln
- Phi Delta Theta, 2 Ridgewood Rd
- Phi Kappa Tau, 106 The Knoll
- Phi Mu, 509 Wyckoff Rd
- Phi Sigma Kappa, 702 University Ave
- Pi Beta Phi, 330 Triphammer Rd
- Pi Kappa Alpha, 17 South Ave
- Seal and Serpent Society, 305 Thurston Ave
- Sigma Chi (“Greystone”), 106 Cayuga Heights Rd
- Sigma Delta Tau, 115 Ridgewood Rd
- Sigma Nu, 230 Willard Wy
- Sigma Pi, 730 University Ave
- Theta Delta Chi, 800 University Ave
- Zeta Beta Tau, 1 Edgecliff Pl
