= List of Block and Bridle chapters =

Block and Bridle is a professional fraternity in the field of animal husbandry. Following is a list of its chapters.

Charter date	Institutions	Location	Status	Ref.
March 15, 1918	North Dakota State University	Fargo, North Dakota	Active	(Note: Chapter was formed as the Saddle and Sirloin Club and continues to use that name. It uses its original establishment date as its charter date.)
December 2, 1919	Iowa State University	Ames, Iowa	Active	
December 2, 1919	University of Kansas	Lawrence, Kansas	Inactive	
December 2, 1919	University of Nebraska–Lincoln	Lincoln, Nebraska	Active	
December 2, 1919	University of Missouri	Columbia, Missouri	Active	
1920	West Virginia University	Morgantown, West Virginia	Active	
1920	Oklahoma State University–Stillwater	Stillwater, Oklahoma	Active	
1920	University of Minnesota	Saint Paul, Minnesota	Active	
1923	University of Kentucky	Lexington, Kentucky	Active	
1924	Pennsylvania State University	University Park, Pennsylvania	Active	
1928–1956; xxxx ?	Washington State University	Pullman, Washington	Active	
1930	Michigan State University	East Lansing, Michigan	Active	
1931	Louisiana State University	Baton Rouge, Louisiana	Active	
1933	Texas Tech University	Lubbock, Texas	Active	
1935	Virginia Tech	Blacksburg, Virginia	Active	
1936	North Carolina State University	Raleigh, North Carolina	Active	(Note: Chapter was formed as the Animal Science Club and continues to use that name. It uses its original formation date as its charter date.)
1937	Cornell University	Ithaca, New York	Inactive	
1937	University of Florida	Gainesville, Florida	Active	
1937	Clemson University	Clemson, South Carolina	Active	
1938	University of Connecticut	Storrs, Connecticut	Active	
1938	University of Maryland, College Park	College Park, Maryland	Active	
1939	New Mexico State University	Las Cruces, New Mexico	Active	
1939	Mississippi State University	Starkville, Mississippi	Active	
1946	South Dakota State University	Brookings, South Dakota	Active	
1946	University of Tennessee	Knoxville, Tennessee	Active	
1948	Rutgers University–New Brunswick	New Brunswick, New Jersey	Active	(Note: Chapter is called the Animal Science Club.)
1949	Auburn University	Auburn, Alabama	Active	
1950–1955	California Polytechnic State College	San Luis Obispo, California	Inactive	
1950–1953	Utah State University	Logan, Utah	Inactive	
1951	Texas A&M University	College Station, Texas	Active	(Note: Chapter is called the Saddle and Sirloin Club.)
1954	Tennessee Tech	Cookeville, Tennessee	Active	
1955	University of Illinois Urbana-Champaign	Urbana, Illinois	Active	(Note: Chapter is called the Hoof and Horn Club.)
1955	Louisiana Tech University	Ruston, Louisiana	Active	
1956	McNeese State University	Lake Charles, Louisiana	Active	
1956	Purdue University	West Lafayette, Indiana	Active	
1957	California State University, Fresno	Fresno, California	Active	
1957	University of Idaho	Moscow, Idaho	Active	
1959	Arkansas State University	State University, Arkansas	Active	
1959	Middle Tennessee State University	Murfreesboro, Tennessee	Active	
1959	Oklahoma Panhandle State University	Goodwell, Oklahoma	Active	
1959	Southern Illinois University Carbondale	Carbondale, Illinois	Active	
1960	University of Georgia	Athens, Georgia	Active	
1962	Georgia Tech	Atlanta, Georgia	Inactive	
1977	Angelo State University	San Angelo, Texas	Active	
c. 2005	Garden City Community College	Garden City, Kansas	Active	
2013	Arkansas Tech University	Russellville, Arkansas	Active	(Note: Chapter is called the Agriculture Club.)
	Abilene Christian University	Abilene, Texas	Active	
	Abraham Baldwin Agricultural College	Tifton, Georgia	Active	(Note: Chapter is called the ABAC Cattleman's Association.)
	Alabama A&M University	Normal, Alabama	Active	
	Alcorn State University	Lorman, Mississippi	Active	
	Arkansas State University	Jonesboro, Arkansas	Archive	
	Berry College	Mount Berry, Georgia	Active	
	Brigham Young University	Provo, Utah	Inactive	
	California State University, Chico	Chico, California	Active	
	California State Polytechnic University, Pomona	Pomona, California	Active	
	Clarendon College	Clarendon, Texas	Active	
	Cloud County Community College	Concordia, Kansas	Active	
	Colby Community College	Colby, Kansas	Active	
	Colorado State University	Fort Collins, Colorado	Active	
	Cornell University	Ithaca, New York	Active	
	Delaware Valley University	Doylestown, Pennsylvania	Active	
	Dodge City Community College	Dodge City, Kansas	Active	
	Eastern Wyoming College	Torrington, Wyoming	Active	
	Fort Hays State University	Hays, Kansas	Active	
	Hutchinson Community College	Hutchinson, Kansas	Active	
	Illinois State University	Normal, Illinois	Active	
	Kansas State University	Manhattan, Kansas	Active	
	Laramie County Community College	Cheyenne, Wyoming	Active	
	Missouri State University	Springfield, Missouri	Active	
	Montana State University	Bozeman, Montana	Inactive	
	Morehead State University	Morehead, Kentucky	Active	
	Murray State University	Murray, Kentucky	Active	
	North Central Texas College	Gainesville, Texas	Inactive	
	Northeast Community College	Norfolk, Nebraska	Active	
	Northwest College	Powell, Wyoming	Active	
	Northwest Missouri State University	Maryville, Missouri	Active	
	Ohio State University	Columbus, Ohio	Active	
	Oregon State University	Corvallis, Oregon	Inactive	(Note: Chapter is called the Withycombe Club.)
	Pratt Community College	Pratt, Kansas	Active	
	Sam Houston State University	Huntsville, Texas	Active	
	Seward County Community College	Liberal, Kansas	Active	
	Southern Utah University	Cedar City, Utah	Active	
	Stephen P. Austin University	Nacogdoches, Texas	Inactive	
	Sul Ross State University	Alpine, Texas	Active	
	Tarleton State University	Stephenville, Texas	Active	
	Texas State University	San Marcos, Texas	Active	
	West Texas A&M University	Canyon, Texas	Active	
	University of Arizona	Tucson, Arizona	Active	
	University of Arkansas	Fayetteville, Arkansas	Active	
	University of California, Davis	Davis, California	Active	
	University of Delaware	Newark, Delaware	Active	
	University of Findlay	Findlay, Ohio	Active	
	University of Louisiana at Monroe	Monroe, Louisiana	Active	
	University of Maine	Orono, Maine	Active	(Note: Chapter is called the University of Maine Animal Club.)
	University of Tennessee at Martin	Martin, Tennessee	Active	
	University of Wisconsin–Madison	Madison, Wisconsin	Active	
	University of Wisconsin–Platteville	Platteville, Wisconsin	Active	
	University of Wisconsin–River Falls	River Falls, Wisconsin	Active	
	University of Wyoming	Laramie, Wyoming	Active	
	Western Illinois University	Macomb, Illinois	Active	
	Western Kentucky University	Bowling Green, Kentucky	Active	
