= Consortium of Collegiate Agricultural Organizations =

American trade association

The Consortium of Collegiate Agriculture Organizations was an organization to assist future leaders of the agriculture industry with career opportunities, leadership development, and ideas to make the member organizations more effective. It held its first AGM in 2006 at the headquarters of John Deere in Moline, Illinois.

== Mission ==
The Consortium of Collegiate Agriculture Organizations stated in 2007 that its mission is to maximize collaboration of the 17 charter collegiate agricultural organizations and industry partners to enhance the personal, organizational, career and community education of future leaders.

== Members ==
In 2007, the members of CCAO were:

- Agriculture Future of America (AFA)
- Agricultural Communicators of Tomorrow (ACT)
- Alpha Gamma Rho fraternity (AGR)
- Alpha Gamma Sigma fraternity (AGS)
- Alpha Tau Alpha (ATA)
- Alpha Zeta
- Block and Bridle
- Collegiate 4-H
- Collegiate FFA
- FarmHouse
- Minorities in Agriculture, National Resources and Related Sciences (MANRRS)
- National Agri-Marketing Association (NAMA)
- National Agricultural Alumni and Development Association (NAADA)
- National Association of Landscape Professionals
- National Postsecondary Agricultural Student Organization (PAS)
- Sigma Alpha
