= Harry Livingston French =

American architect (1871–1928)

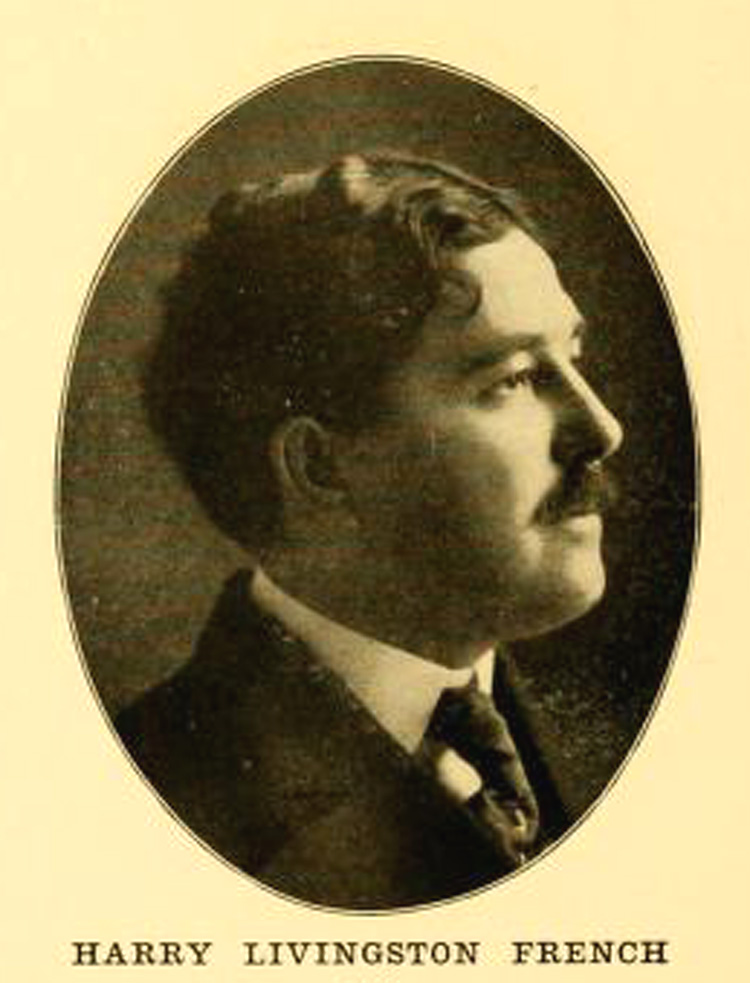

Harry Livingston French (November 21, 1871 – January 16, 1928) was an American architect based in Wilkes-Barre, Pennsylvania. He designed in a variety of styles, including classical architecture and Gothic revival. His built works included numerous banks, schools, and armories.

== Biography ==
Harry Livingston French was born at Plymouth, Pennsylvania, on November 21, 1871, the son of politician, author, and building contractor Samuel Livingston French and his wife, Harriet Seville Turner. French attended Cornell University, where he was editor of The Cornellian (Cornell's annual yearbook), a member of the junior honorary society Aleph Samach, and a member of the senior honor society Sphinx Head. He also joined the Phi Kappa Psi fraternity and through that organization became a member of the Irving Literary Society. He graduated in 1894 with a Bachelor of Science in Architecture.

In 1897, French and the Canadian-born architect Frederick McCormick formed McCormick & French, an architectural partnership based in Wilkes-Barre, Pennsylvania. Their built works included the interior of the Luzerne County Courthouse, the Nesbitt Theater, and several banks, including the 1906 Second National Bank, considered by some to be Wilkes-Barre's first skyscraper.

French was a member of the Architectural League of New York.

On June 28, 1910, French married Anne Lee Worden of Wilkes-Barre. Their son, Livingston Paine French, was born at Wilkes-Barre on May 6, 1911.

Harry Livingston French died at New York City on January 16, 1928. His business partner, Frederick McCormick died on September 2, 1929.

== McCormick & French's built work ==
Among the completed buildings of French's firm, McCormick & French, are the following:

- The Stegmaier Brewing Company; Wash House, Wilkes-Barre, Pennsylvania (built 1896).
- Nesbitt Theater, Wilkes-Barre, Pennsylvania (completed October 1897).
- Hotel Oneonta, Harveys Lake, Pennsylvania (built 1898; destroyed by fire in 1919).
- The Stegmaier Brewing Company; Wagon Shed, Wilkes-Barre, Pennsylvania (built 1899).
- The Hospital for the Insane, later called Retreat State Hospital, Newport Township, Pennsylvania (completed 1900).
- The Stegmaier Brewing Company; Stables, Wilkes-Barre, Pennsylvania (built 1901).
- The Sisters of Christian Charity, Holy Family Convent, Danville, Pennsylvania (built 1902).
- The Stegmaier Brewing Company; Bottling House, Wilkes-Barre, Pennsylvania (built 1902).
- The Hospital for the Insane (Additional Wings), Newport Township, Pennsylvania (built 1905).
- The Stegmaier Brewing Company; Bottling House Addition, Wilkes-Barre, Pennsylvania (built 1905).
- Hotel Redington, Wilkes-Barre, Pennsylvania (built 1906).
- The Derr Apartment House, Wilkes-Barre, Pennsylvania (built 1906).
- Central High School, Plymouth, Pennsylvania (second high school building, built 1906).
- The Stegmaier Brewing Company; Cold Storage Building, Wilkes-Barre, Pennsylvania (built 1907).
- Plymouth National Bank, Plymouth, Pennsylvania (built 1907).
- First Eastern Bank, Wilkes-Barre, Pennsylvania (built 1907).
- The Hazard Wire Rope Works (power plant, rope mill and warehouse), Wilkes-Barre, Pennsylvania (built 1907).
- Armory, National Guard of PA, Pittston, Pennsylvania (dedicated February 7, 1907).
- Armory, National Guard of PA, Columbia, Pennsylvania (dedicated March 13, 1907).
- Armory, National Guard of PA, Easton, Pennsylvania (dedicated October 17, 1907).
- The Bennett & Phelps Apartment House, Wilkes-Barre, Pennsylvania (built 1907).
- Armory, National Guard of PA, Pine Grove, Pennsylvania (built 1908).
- Armory, National Guard of PA, Williamsport, Pennsylvania (built 1908).
- Interior, Luzerne County Court House, Wilkes-Barre, Pennsylvania (built 1909).
- Trucksville M.E. Church, Trucksville, Pennsylvania (built 1910).
- The YWCA Building, Franklin Street, Wilkes-Barre, Pennsylvania (dedicated October 12, 1910).
- Armory, National Guard of PA, Co. B, 8th Regiment, Tamaqua, Pennsylvania (built c. 1910).
- Armory, National Guard of PA, Honesdale, Pennsylvania (built 1911).
- The Susquehanna Coal Co. Office Building, Main Street, Nanticoke, Pennsylvania (dedicated May 1, 1911).
- First National Bank, Plymouth, Pennsylvania (built 1915).
- St. Mary's R.C. Church, Berwick, Pennsylvania (dedicated July 1917).
- Nesbitt Memorial Hospital, Kingston, Pennsylvania (completed 1929).

== Gallery ==
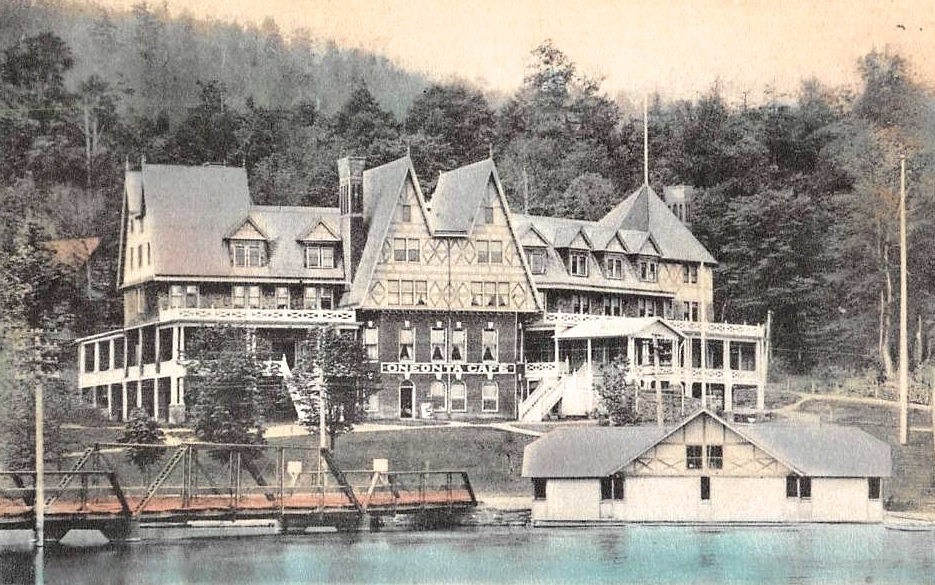
Hotel Oneonta Harveys Lake, Pennsylvania (built 1898).

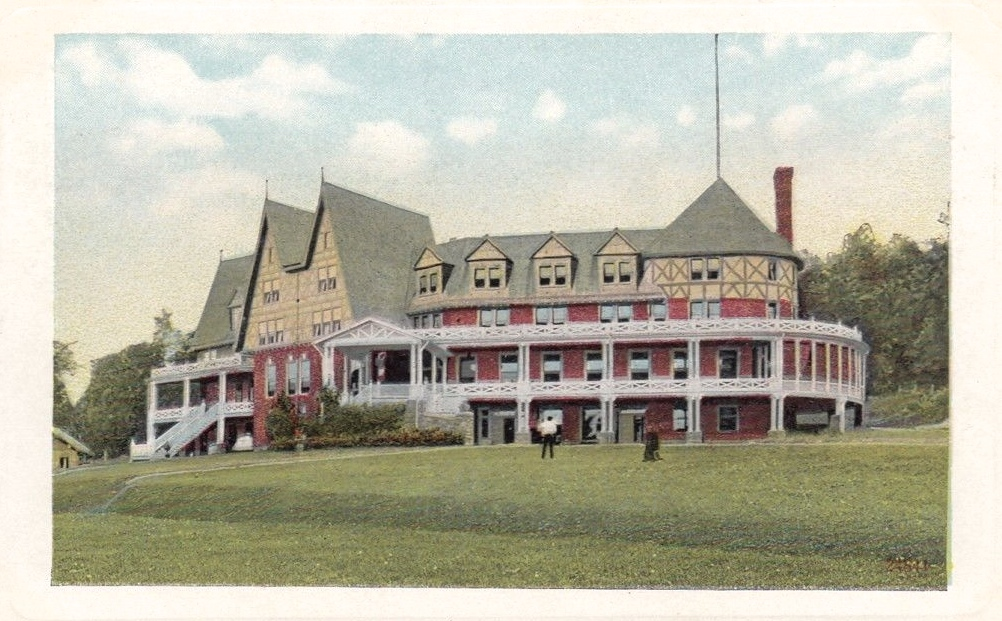
Hotel Oneonta Harveys Lake, Pennsylvania (built 1898).

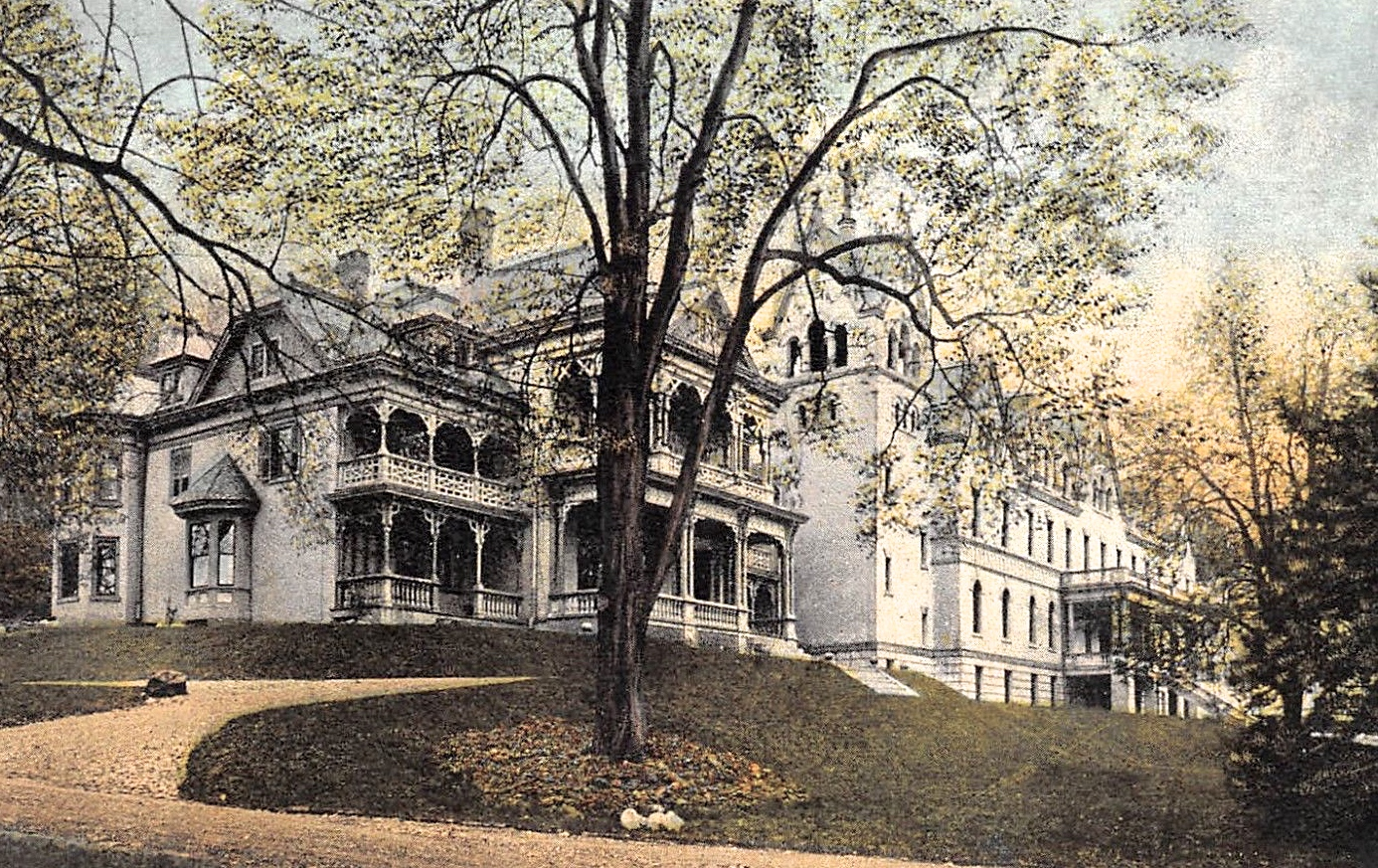
Holy Family Convent, Danville, Pennsylvania (built 1902).

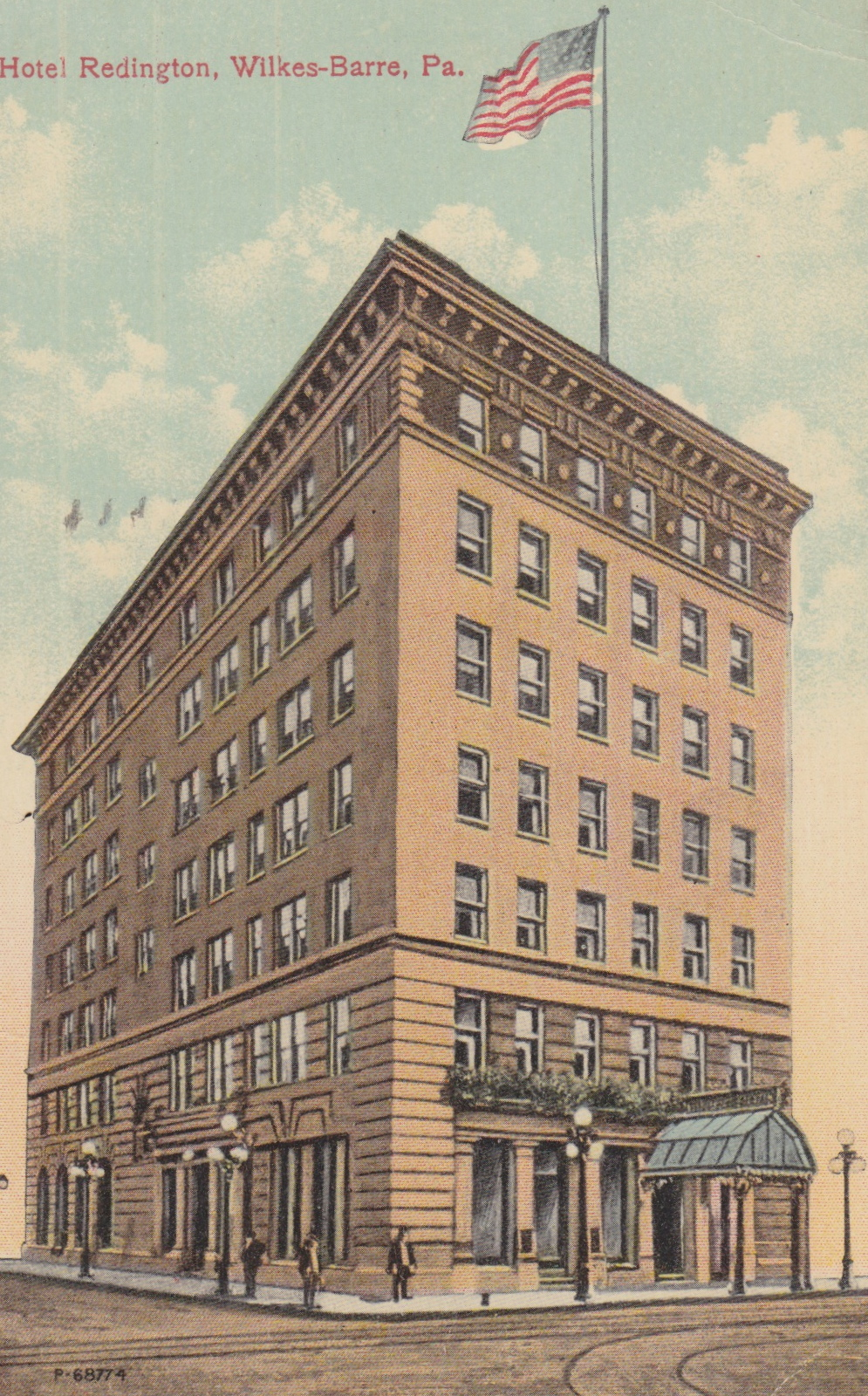
The Hotel Redington in Wilkes-Barre, PA (built 1906).

The Second National Bank in Wilkes-Barre, PA (built 1906).

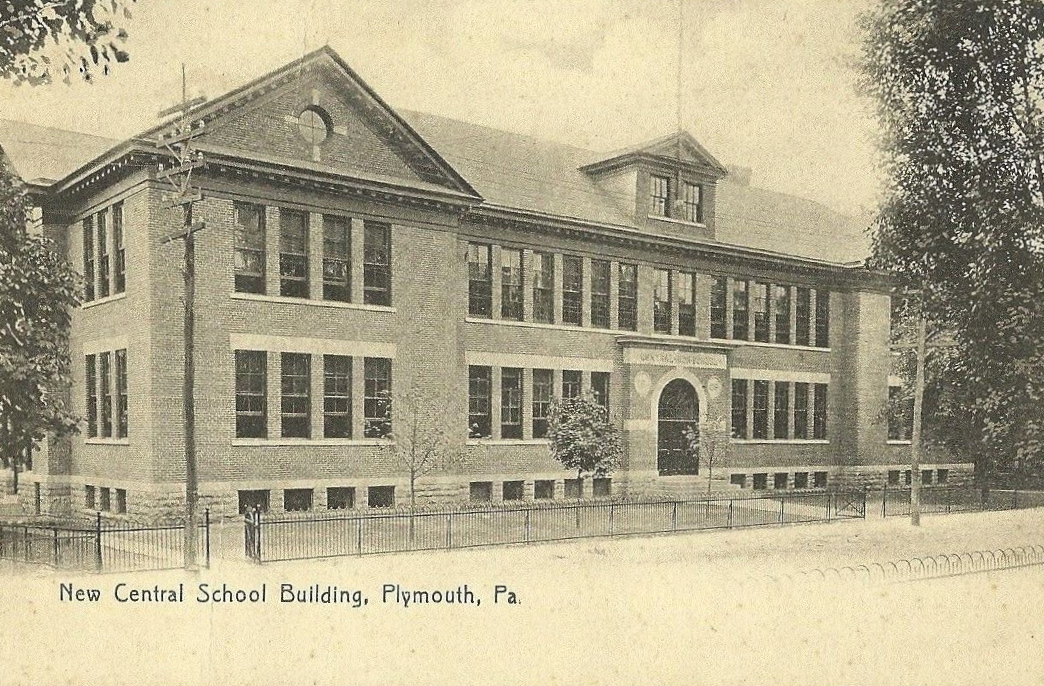
The Central High School in Plymouth, PA (built 1906).

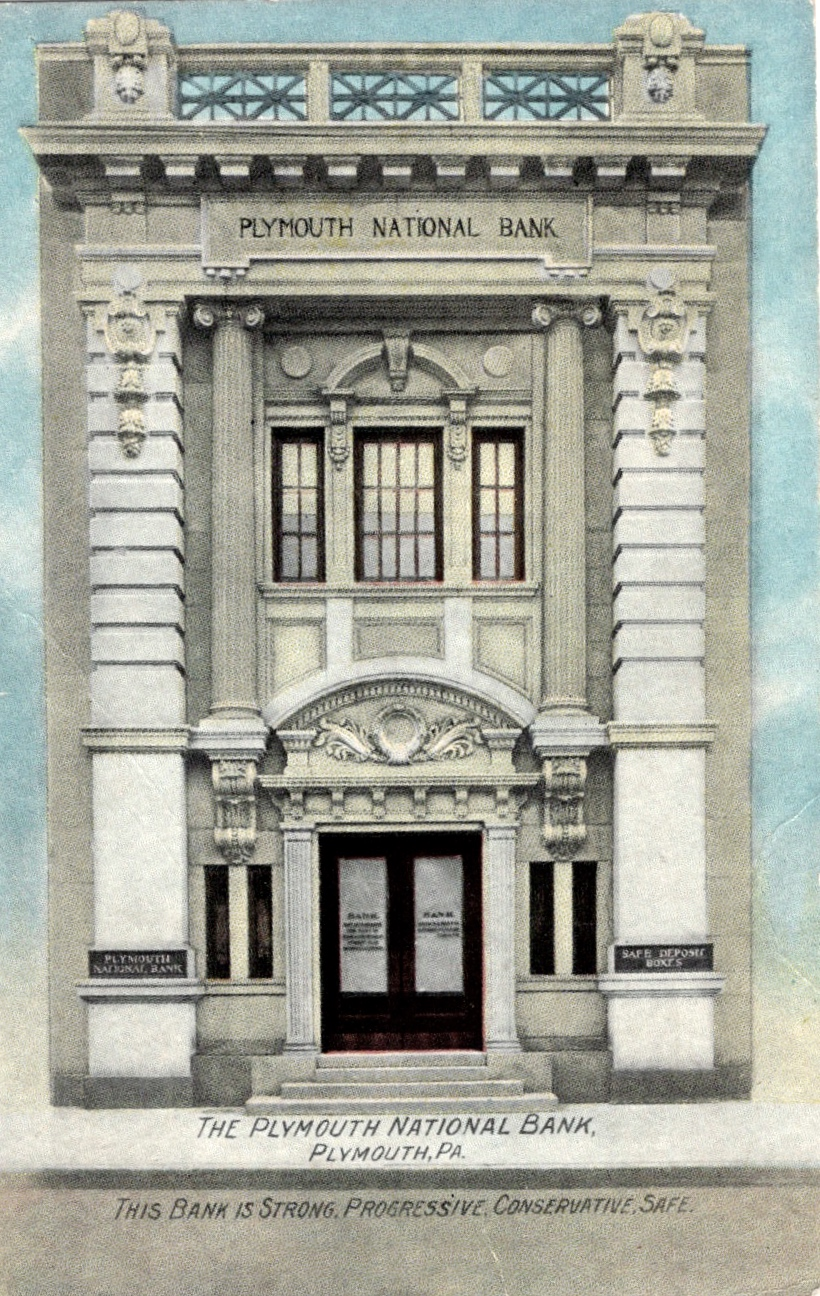
Plymouth National Bank, Plymouth, PA (built 1907).

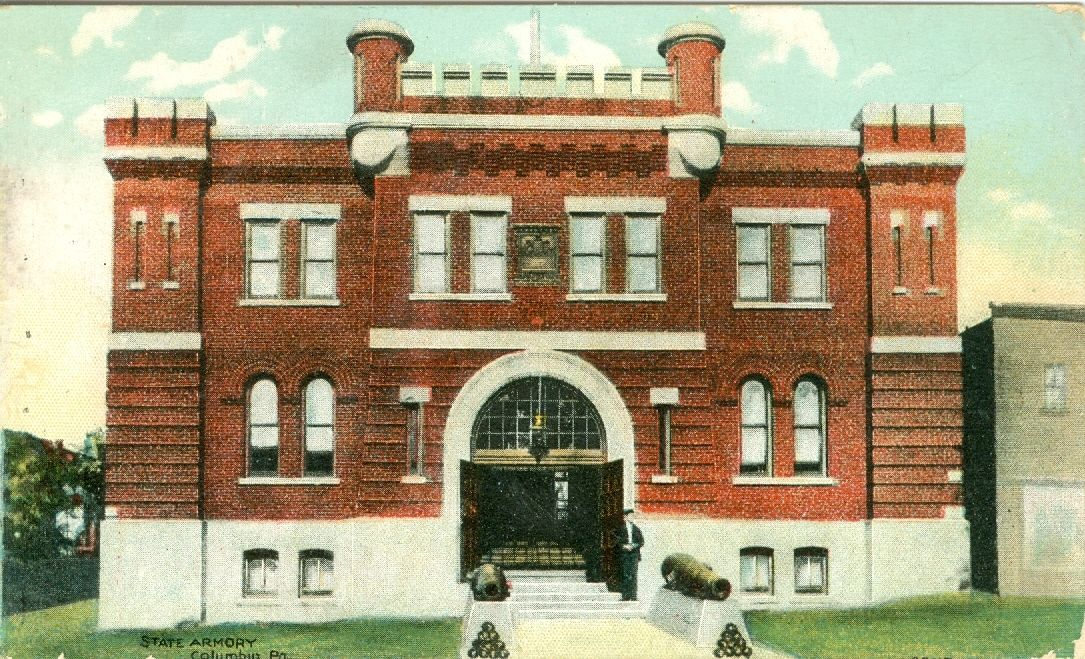
Armory, Columbia, Pennsylvania (dedicated 1907).

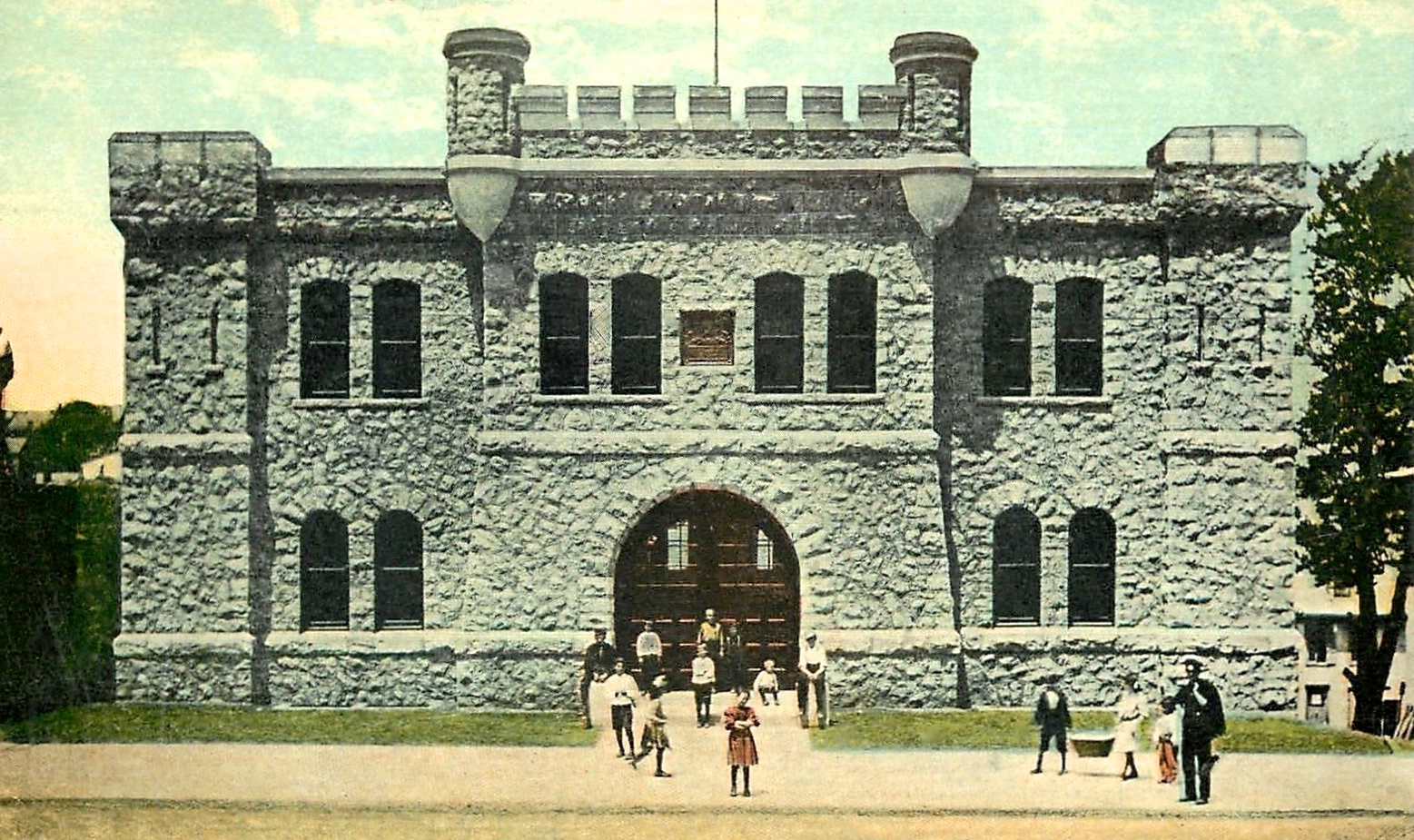
Armory, Easton, Pennsylvania (built 1907).

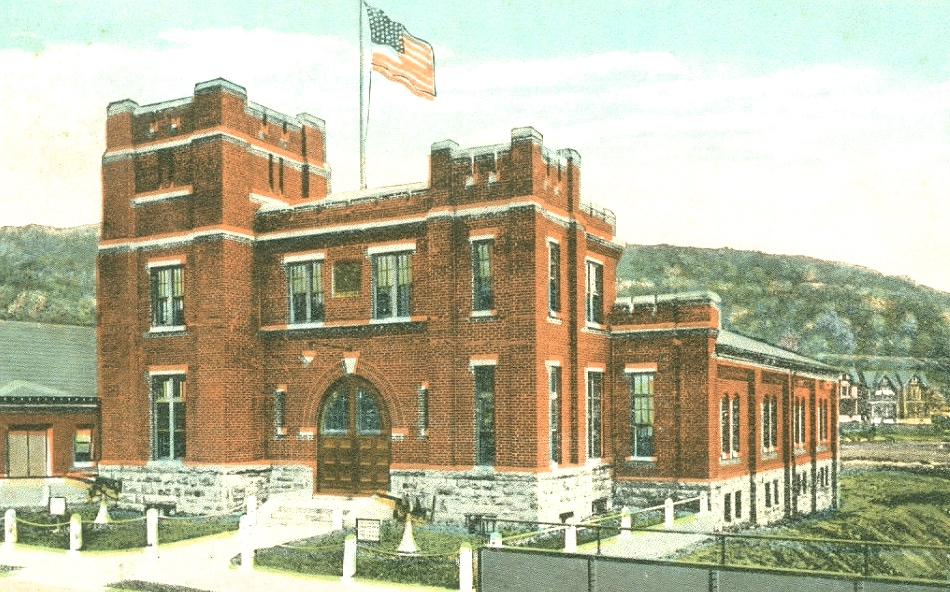
Armory, Tamaqua, Pennsylvania (built about 1910).

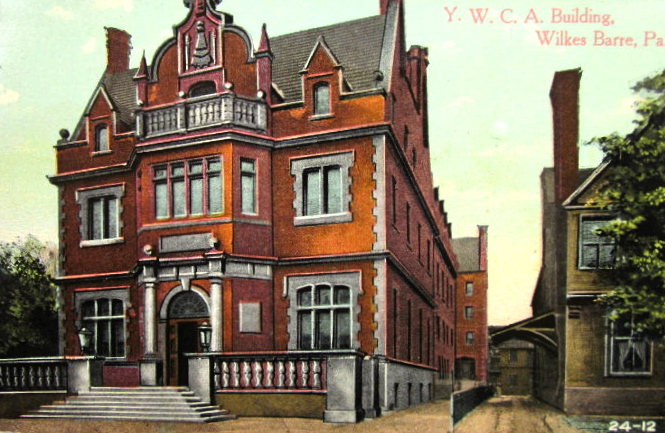
The YWCA Building in Wilkes-Barre, PA (built 1910).

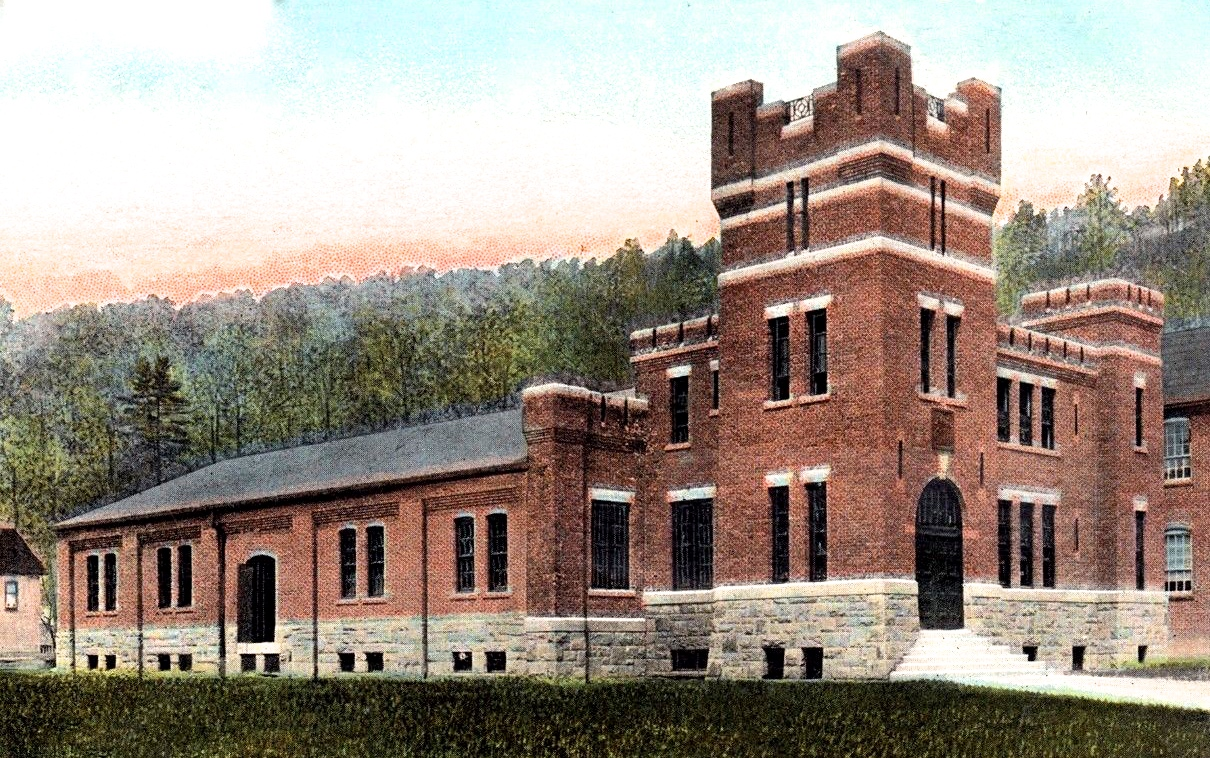
Armory, Honesdale, Pennsylvania (built in 1910).

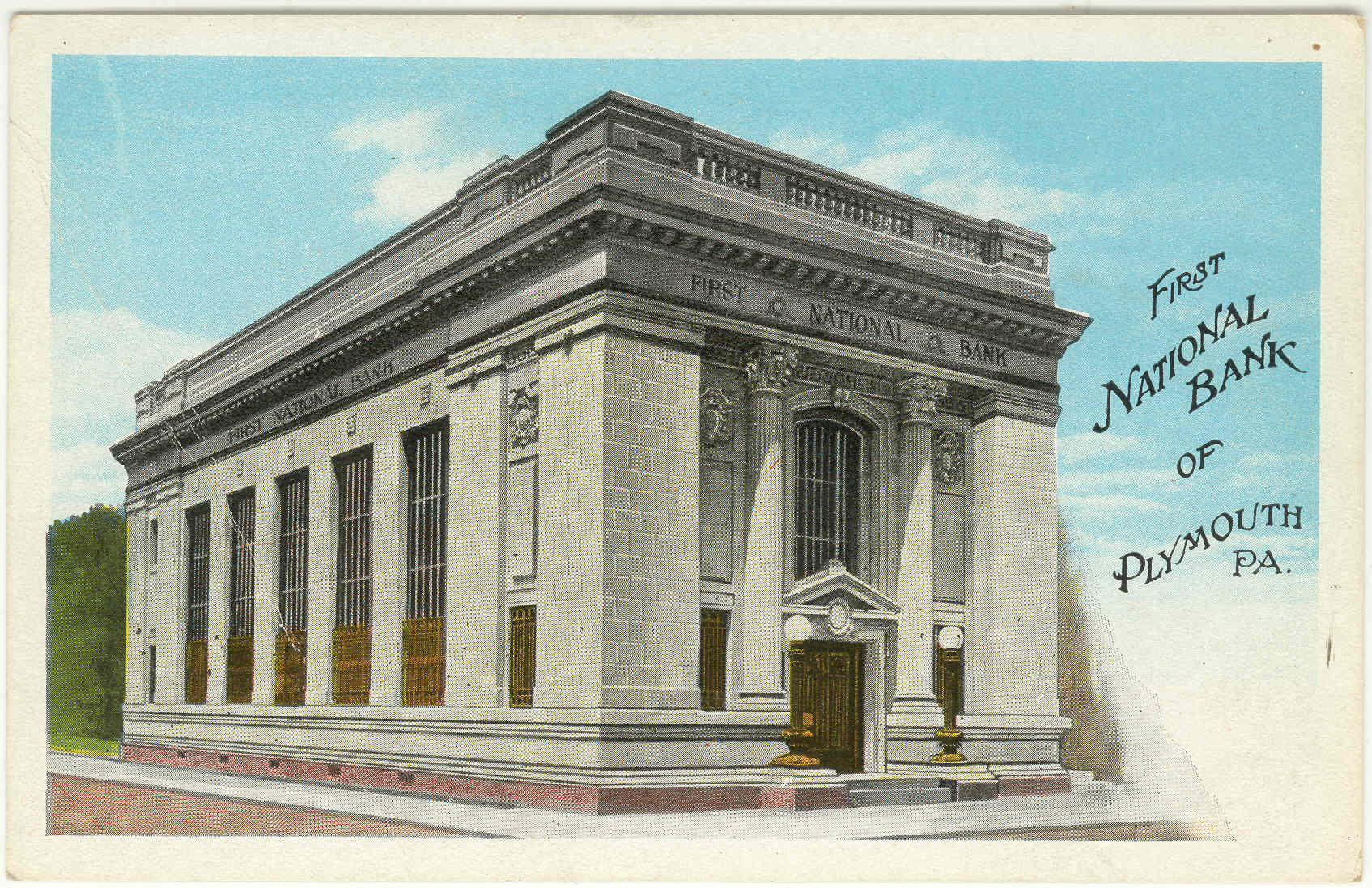
The First National Bank in Plymouth, PA (built 1915).

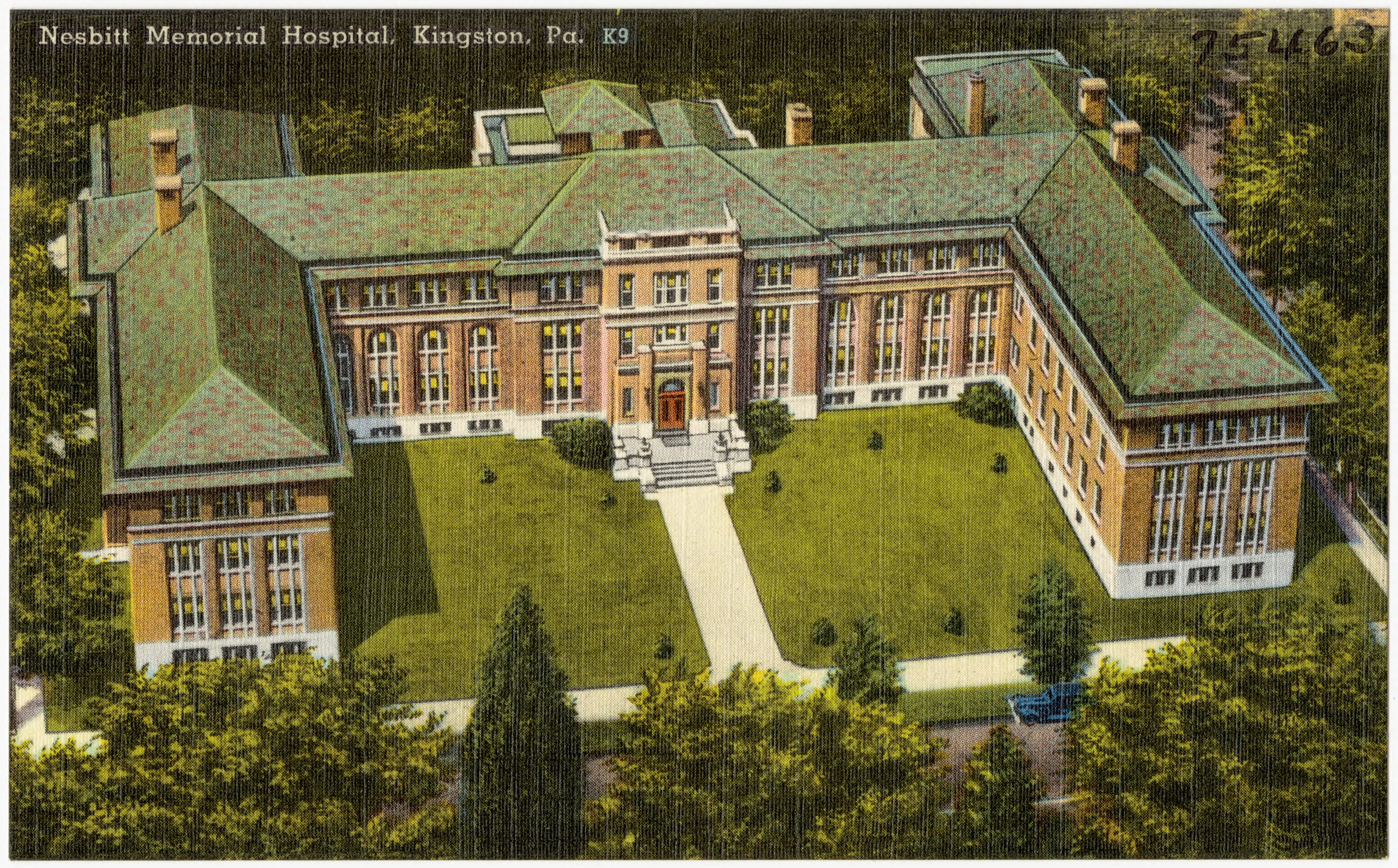
Nesbitt Memorial Hospital, Kingston, Pennsylvania (completed 1929).

== See also ==
- Architecture of Plymouth, Pennsylvania
- List of American architects
