= Aleph Samach =

American collegiate society

- אס
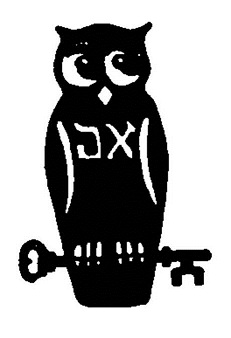
- The Aleph Samach Seal, 1900
- Founded: 1893; 133 years ago Cornell University
- Type: Honor
- Affiliation: Independent
- Status: Defunct
- Defunct date: After 1985
- Emphasis: Juniors
- Scope: Local
- Pillars: Leadership, Loyalty, Service, and Honor
- Chapters: 1
- Headquarters: Ithaca, New York; United States

Aleph Samach (אס) was a junior honor society at Cornell University in Ithaca, New York that existed from 1893 until 1981.

== History ==
Aleph Samach (sometimes spelled Aleph Samech) was founded in 1893 at Cornell University as an honorary secret society for men of the junior class.

Aleph Samach sought to recognize those men of distinct character who were emerging leaders on campus. While senior members played an advisory role within the society, Aleph Samach's primary goal was "to promote the greater good of the Cornell community by connecting junior leaders, cultivating their leadership skills, and developing their commitment to campus service."

The society remained strong in its early decades and was an influential organization on campus. Along with some of the other class societies, most notably Quill and Dagger and Sphinx Head, it promoted campus-wide agendas; some of the more notable results being the creation of what would become Slope Day.

By 1896, The New York Times listed Aleph Samach as the junior class society at Cornell, alongside the Chancery (senior law), Sphinx Head (senior), Quill and Dagger (senior), and Theta Nu Epsilon (sophomore) societies. The turn of the century saw Aleph Samach integrated into the senior honorary societies system of campus-wide governance. Aleph Samach was a stepping stone to Sphinx Head and Quill and Dagger.

During the "club war" of 1913–1914, Aleph Samach allied itself with The Cornell Daily Sun, Sphinx Head, and Quill and Dagger to suppress the growing influence of the following "social clubs" or drinking societies at Cornell: Majura, Beth l'Amed, Kappa Beta Phi, Bench and Board, Gemel Kharm, Yonan, Mermaid, Krug and Tafel, and the Climax. The three honorary societies and the Sun would not allow any member of the drinking societies to be tapped into their organizations. In 1917, Aleph Samach was the uncontested honorary society of the junior class.

After the creation of a unified Student Council following the First World War, the honorary societies remained an active force. In the fall of 1920, Aleph Samach joined with the Student Council, Sphinx Head, and Quill and Dagger to petition the Cornell Board of Trustees to elevate the popular Acting President to the position of president until the university chose a new head. In 1939, Aleph Samach was listed as a junior class co-honorary society along with the Red Key Society.

Aleph Samach can document its operational status as late as AY 1964-1965, AY 1978-79, AY 1980–81 and AY 1985-1986. Aleph Samach was active until 1981.

== Symbols and traditions ==
"Aleph" and "Samach" are letters of the Hebrew language. Most of the rituals of Aleph Samach were secret. It was founded on four pillars: leadership, loyalty, service, and honor.

== Membership ==
Students were tapped for membership in Aleph Samach in the spring of their sophomore year or fall of their junior year. Selection was based on participation in extra-curricular activities. Aleph Samach was an all-male institution. Cornell had a separate but equal honorary society for junior women, Raven and Serpent.

== Notable members ==
- Sandy Berger, US National Security Advisor
- Gib Cool, All-American football player
- Harry Livingston French, architect
- Charles Moore, gold medalist in the 400 metre hurdles in the 1952 Summer Olympics
- Bernard O'Rourke, football player and coach
- Sam Roberts, journalist with The New York Times
- John L. Senior, sports administrator
- Willard Dickerman Straight, investment banker, publisher, and diplomat
- Kurt Vonnegut, author
- E. B. White, author of children's books

== See also ==
- Collegiate secret societies in North America
- List of Cornell University fraternities and sororities
