= Aleph Yodh He =

American Jewish medical fraternity (1908–1921)

- איה
- Founded: 1908; 118 years ago Chicago College of Medicine and Surgery
- Type: Professional
- Affiliation: Independent
- Status: Merged
- Merge date: 1921
- Successor: Phi Lambda Kappa
- Emphasis: Medicine and Jewish
- Scope: National
- Publication: Medic
- Chapters: 10
- Members: 350 lifetime
- Headquarters: United States

Aleph Yodh He (איה) was an American professional medical fraternity for Jewish students. It went dormant in 1921 when it merged with Phi Lambda Kappa.

== History ==
Aleph Yodh He formed in 1908 at the Chicago College of Medicine and Surgery. It operated with three divisions: Aleph Yodh He in the east, Phi Lambda Kappa in the West, and Zeta Mu Phi in the Midwest. Its publication was Medic, which was published quarterly starting in January 1915.

At a convention in Chicago in December 1921, these three divisions merged into Phi Lambda Kappa, discontinuing the use of the name Aleph Yodh He. Around the time of the merger, Aleph Yodh He had some 350 members.

== Chapters ==
Following are the chapters of Aeph Yodh He: Inactive chapters and institutions are indicated in italics.

Chapter	Charter date and range	Institution	Location	Status	Ref.
Alpha	1908–1917	Chicago College of Medicine and Surgery	Chicago, Illinois	Inactive	(Note: Loyola University purchased the college In 1917.)
Beta	1910–1921	College of Physicians and Surgeons	Chicago, Illinois	Merged (ΦΛΚ)	(Note: The chapter became the Alpha Alpha chapter of Phi Lambda Kappa when the two fraternities merged.)
Gamma	1912–1917	Jenner Medical College	Chicago, Illinois	Inactive	(Note: College closed in 1917.)
Delta (first)	1913–1915	School of Medicine of Loyola University	Chicago, Illinois	Moved	(Note: The college merged with Loyola University in 1915. This chapter became the Gamma chapter of Phi Lambda Kappa as part of the national merger of the two fraternities.)
Delta (second)	1915–1921	Loyola University	Chicago, Illinois	Merged (ΦΛΚ)	(Note: Chapter merged with the Gamma chapter of Phi Lambda Kappa with the national merger of the two fraternities.)
Epsilon	1914–1921	University of Pennsylvania	Philadelphia, Pennsylvania	Merged (ΦΛΚ)	(Note: Chapter merged with the Alpha chapter of Phi Lambda Kappa, as part of the national merger of the two fraternities.)
Zeta	1914–1921	Jefferson Medical College	Philadelphia, Pennsylvania	Merged (ΦΛΚ)	(Note: Chapter merged with the Beta chapter of Phi Lambda Kappa, as part of the national merger of the two fraternities.)
Eta	1914–1916	Medico Chirurgical College of Philadelphia	Philadelphia, Pennsylvania	Consolidated	(Note: In 1916, the college merged with the University of Pennsylvania Medical College and Jefferson Medical College, thus sparking a merger between Epsilon and Zeta chapters.)
Theta	1914–1921	University of Maryland	Baltimore, Maryland	Merged (ΦΛΚ)	(Note: This chapter became the Xi chapter of Phi Lambda Kappa as part of the national merger of the two fraternities.)
Iota	1914–19xx ?	Temple University	Philadelphia, Pennsylvania	Inactive	

== See also ==
- List of Jewish fraternities and sororities
- Professional fraternities and sororities
