= Gib Cool =

American football player

Cornell Big Red
- Position: Center

Personal information
- Born: c. 1894; Pittston, Pennsylvania, U.S.
- Died: February 8, 1933

Career information
- College: Cornell (1915)

Awards and highlights
- National champion (1915); Second-team All-American (1915)

William Cameron "Gib" Cool (c. 1894 – February 8, 1933) was an All-American football player. Cool played center for the Big Red of Cornell University from 1913 to 1915 and was selected as an All-American after his senior year in 1915. He was inducted into the Cornell Athletic Hall of Fame in 1981.

== Early life ==
A native of Pittston, Pennsylvania, Cool attended the Wyoming Seminary, the Sturgis Tutoring School and the Manlius Academy before enrolling in the College of Agriculture at Cornell University.

== Athlete at Cornell ==
Cool played college football at Cornell from 1913-1915, and the team was unbeaten in Cool's three years playing center. He was one of the leaders of the 1915 Cornell team that went undefeated and untied and was recognized as national champion. Three players from the 1915 Cornell team were selected as All-Americans—Cool, quarterback Charley Barrett and end Murray Shelton. In the 1915 match against Harvard, Cornell quarterback Charley Barrett was knocked unconscious in the first half; Cool took over and led the team to a 10-0 victory, Harvard's first defeat since 1911. Cool was known as a football "iron man" who played every minute of every game for two seasons with Cornell. After his senior season in 1915, Cool was selected as a first-team All-American by Walter Eckersall and Fielding H. Yost and as a second-team All-American by Walter Camp and Frank G. Menke. He was also chosen as a first-team All-American by the Brooklyn Eagle that wrote: "Cool, a Cornell man, has shown himself to be a great little figure, a wonderful man on the defense, able to pass accurately, and then get down the field to make tackles. Cool was a rambler and he stopped many plays at Cambridge and Philadelphia."

Sports writer Alan Gould later wrote of Cool: "For his weight and inches, Cool was one of the finest pivotmen in football history." After Cool's death, Gould recalled the lone touchdown of Cool's college football career. The touchdown came in a 1915 game against Virginia Poly. Cool and Cornell quarterback Charley Barrett were roommates and close friends, and Barrett knew that Cool's secret ambition was to score a touchdown. After Cool intercepted a forward pass, Barrett called two straight plays with Cool as the ball carrier, and Cool scored on the second carry.

In addition to football, Cool rowed with the Cornell crew and was a member of Delta Kappa Epsilon fraternity, Sphinx Head, Aleph Samach, Beth L'amed, the Sunday Night Club, Dunstan, the Sophomore Smoker Committee, the Junior Promenade Committee, and the Junior Election Committee.

Cool was posthumously inducted into Cornell's Athletic Hall of Fame in 1981.

== Later life ==
After graduating from Cornell, Cool coached the University of Tennessee football team for one year. When the United States entered World War I, Cool enlisted in the U.S. Army, serving as an instructor in the School of Fire at Fort Sill, Oklahoma. Cool died of a heart attack in a New York restaurant at age 39. He was a resident of Pittston at the time of his death.

== See also ==
- 1915 College Football All-America Team
