= National Postsecondary Agricultural Student Organization =

American youth organization

National Professional Agricultural Students Organization
- Abbreviation: PAS
- Formation: 1980; 46 years ago
- Type: Youth organization
- Legal status: Inter-Curricular Nonprofit organization
- Purpose: To provide individual growth, leadership and career preparation opportunities for professional agriculture students.
- Headquarters: Minneapolis, Minnesota
- Members: 1,115; 56 Chapters
- Executive Director: MaryKay Delvo
- National Advisor: Dr. Steve A. Brown
- Affiliations: National FFA Organization, Consortium of Collegiate Agricultural Organizations
- Website: nationalpas.org

The National Professional Agricultural Student Organization, regularly referred to as PAS, is a national organization associated with postsecondary institutions offering baccalaureate degrees, associate degrees, diplomas and/or certificates in agriculture/agribusiness and natural resources. PAS is one of the ten career and technical student organizations that has been approved by the United States Department of Education as an integral part of career and technical education also referred to as vocational education. PAS is a member of the Consortium of Collegiate Agricultural Organizations.

PAS was originally organized for postsecondary programs awarding associate degrees or certificates and has since expanded to include baccalaureate degree programs. The Illinois PAS has all four of that state's agricultural universities involved in PAS and Iowa PAS has their state land grant of Iowa State University in PAS. This shift allows students who then transfer to a 4-year university to continue their direct involvement in PAS, provides the opportunities of PAS to university students and further deepens connections between 2 and 4 year agricultural institutions.

The national organization was organized in March 1979 under Draft Bylaws. PAS was officially founded in March 1980 in Kansas City, Missouri.

== History ==
The history of PAS begins with the expansion of vocational-technical education at the postsecondary level. With state and federal legislation in the 60’s and 70’s, the agricultural education movement expanded greatly with more and more postsecondary agricultural programs. This movement started the creation of many local college student agricultural organizations at the two-year institutions.

On the national level, the formation of PAS began with a National Seminar in 1966 at SUNY Cobleskill, Cobleskill, New York. A Committee on “Youth Organizations and Activities for Two-Year Post High School Students in Agriculture" was created. It was decided that PAS should be separate from the National FFA Organization. It also recommended that the organizations begin first with the local, then state, and proceed to a national organization.

Some states had developed equivalent organizations that proceeded the formation of the National PAS Organization. In Illinois, some 12 community college agriculture students, their advisors, and guests gathered on February 28, 1974, at the Illinois State Fairgrounds in Springfield for the purpose of forming a statewide organization. Copies of the Students With Agriculture Purposes (SWAP) Constitution and Bylaws were revised and developed into a state constitution and bylaws. Seeing the need for a different name for the organization, the Illinois Association of Community College Agriculturists (IACCA) was passed unanimously to replace SWAP. The IACCA Constitution and Bylaws were officially adopted on April 19, 1974. On February 25, 1989, at the 15th Annual Conference when the 16 delegates assembled voted to change the name from “IACCA” to “PAS” so that Illinois would be aligned with the National PAS Organization.

The idea of a National Organization was again reviewed at the National Agricultural Education Seminar held in Muscatine, Iowa in 1969. However, there was not enough interest in forming a national organization at that time.

In 1973 a National Standards conference hosted by the state of Minnesota recognized the potential need for a student organization. A NPASO Development Committee was formed and was to meet each year at the American Vocational Association (AVA) convention.

In 1976 the committee held a brainstorming conference in the Quad Cities. Some of the major decisions included (1) the terminology of “Agriculture and Related Occupations for students enrolled in two-year institutions; (2) that the organization would be independent of the National FFA Organization and the FFA Alumni; and (3) the development of a procedure for funding and obtaining industry support.

In 1977 with a grant from White Farm Equipment Company, an ad hoc committee met at the National FFA Center to develop the strategies for a national postsecondary student organization. The purpose was to verify the need for and feasibility of organizing an organization.

In 1978, as a continuation of the White Farm Equipment Company grant, a National Seminar for Educators in Postsecondary Institutions was held in Kansas City, Missouri. The seminar concluded with acceptance of six reports including the acceptance and endorsement of the need for a National Postsecondary Student Organization for Agriculture/Agribusiness and Natural Resources students and the need to proceed immediately to finalize the organization.

The first national conference for the National Postsecondary Agricultural Student Organization was held in April 1979.

== Membership ==
National PAS membership now totals some 1,115 members from 56 chapters located in 18 states. Membership is available to students in agriculture, agribusiness and natural resources postsecondary programs in approximately 550 institutions in all 50 states.

== PAS Associates ==
PAS Associates is an organization of former members of the National Postsecondary Agriculture Students Organization. Advisors, administrators, industry representatives, parents, and other PAS supporters are also welcomed to become members. Despite a generally open membership the PAS Associates has had minimal activity and has been faced with financial issues.

PAS Associates was officially organized at the 10th reunion National Conference in Kansas City, Mo., in March 1988.

== Motto ==
Uniting Education & Industry in Agriculture
