= Delta Beta Phi =

American college fraternity (1878–1920s)

- ΔΒΦ
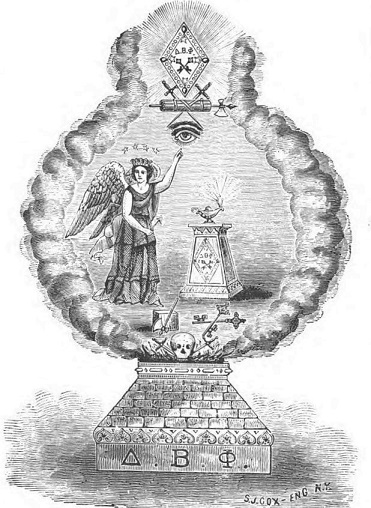
- Founded: January 1878; 148 years ago Cornell University
- Type: Social
- Affiliation: Independent
- Status: Defunct
- Defunct date: c. 1930
- Scope: National
- Colors: Garnet and Black
- Symbol: crossed keys, star
- Publication: Delta Beta Phi Quarterly
- Chapters: 6 (all dormant); Later up to 25
- Members: 500+ lifetime
- Nickname: Dead Bits
- Headquarters: United States

Delta Beta Phi (ΔΒΦ), also called Delta Beta Phi Society, was a small national men's fraternity founded at Cornell University in 1878. The national disbanded in 1882 but was briefly restored through the 1920s.

== History ==
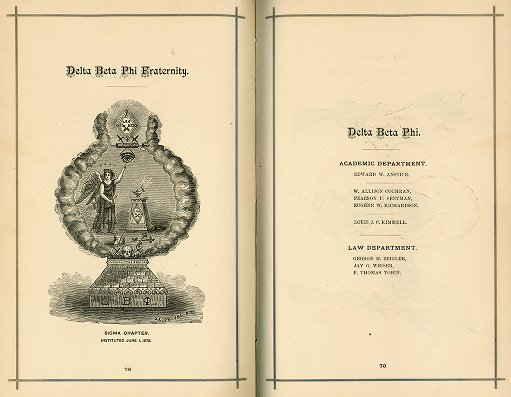
Delta Beta Phi escutcheon and yearbook entry at the University of Pennsylvania in 1879

Delta Beta Phi was formed in January 1878 at Cornell University. Its four founders were J. D. Hamrick, I. W. Kelly, J. S. Monroe, and Willard Olney. The Cornell chapter was cheekily nicknamed the "Dead Bits" on campus on account of the first two letters of its name. It operated as a secret society and admitted Jewish members.

The fraternity expanded to form six chapters in the Northeastern and Mid-Atlantic states, creating five in its first year. Two of its chapters, Psi and Delta, formed from pre-existing local societies. The fraternity was overseen by a Grand Chapter.

A January 1881 fraternal publication notes the fraternity's failed attempt to form a coalition with Psi Upsilon. Nonetheless, the national fraternity, strove to revive its fortunes, seeking to recruit men to revive a chapter at Columbia University in the spring of 1881, albeit unsuccessfully.

In April 1881, the fraternity held its fourth annual convention in Philadelphia, hosted by the Sigma chapter at the University of Pennsylvania. Representatives attended from City College of New York, Columbia College, Cornell University, Johns Hopkins University, Lafayette College, Lehigh University, Princeton University, University of Michigan, and University of Pennsylvania. At that time, the fraternity had initiated about 500 members. However, the convention revealed social and religious differences that set a path toward the fraternity's demise.

In the fall of 1881, the fraternity eyed new chapters in the South, including at the University of Virginia. Meanwhile, Alpha Delta Phi tried to poach the Johns Hopkins chapter by offering commodious new quarters; the Alpha Delta Phi magazine commented, "No doubt Delta Beta Phi will be minus a chapter soon."

By the fifth annual convention in New York City in December 1881, only CCNY, Cornell, Johns Hopkins, Lafayette, and University of Pennsylvania participated. That same month, the Cornell chapter disbanded with the University of Pennsylvania chapter seeking to gain recognition by Psi Upsilon and the Lehigh chapter turning to Alpha Delta Phi. In addition, the Lafayette chapter "languidly expired" with its five remaining members joining Sigma Chi. The CCNY chapter dispersed to Alpha Delta Phi and Theta Delta Chi in 1881.

Thus, the national fraternity of Delta Beta Phi appears to have disbanded in 1882. A fraternal publication indicated that by March 1882, half of its chapters joined Alpha Delta Phi and one formed a new chapter of Theta Delta Chi. A 1905 history of Cornell gives the fraternity rather a short shrift, noting, "Delta Beta Phi ...originated here in 1878, spread to five other institutions, and after four years ceased to exist."

However, the Psi chapter at Lafayette College continued until 1884. The CCNY chapter appears to be responsible for re-founding and expanding to the fraternity in the early 20th century. During the 1920s, yearbooks from Columbia and NYU included Delta Beta Phi and claimed as many as 25 chapters. In the 1920s, Delta Beta Phi promoted itself as a social and non-sectarian fraternity that admitted all who believed in God, including Catholics, Christians, and Jews.

On December 27, 1927, the fraternity held its golden jubilee dinner at the Hotel McAlpin in New York City, with speaker Senator Gerald P. Nye.

== Symbols and publications ==
The official badge of the society was a diamond-shaped lozenge, displaying the Greek letters Δ, Β and Φ, with these surmounting a pair of crossed keys. A star was at each corner of the badge.

The fraternity's crest was an etching that included an image of the badge at the top, displaying other symbolism of the fraternity within a Grecian motif. The crest was in use by the Alpha chapter in the Cornell Cornellian yearbook for the several years it remained active.

The fraternity's colors were garnet and black.

The fraternity began a publication, the Delta Beta Phi Quarterly in 1880 or 1881, but this only existed for a single issue.

== Chapters ==
Following is a list of known chapters of Delta Beta Phi, with inactive chapters and institutions indicated in italics.

Chapter	Charter date and range	Institution	Location	Status	Ref.
Alpha	January 1878 – 1880, xxxx ?–19xx ?	Cornell University	Ithaca, New York	Inactive	(Note: Reported in the 1882/83 Cornellian yearbook to have ceased that year. None of the members appear to have joined a different society. The year prior, three graduated, leaving only two undergrad members. However, according to a newspaper article, the fraternity was active in 1917.)
Beta	1878–1892	University of Pennsylvania	Philadelphia, Pennsylvania	Inactive	(Note: The first edition of Baird's (1879) notes a second ΔΒΦ chapter at UPenn, named Sigma, listing it as having formed in 1878, apparently at the law school. This Baird's record seems incomplete, and omits the Beta chapter. The relationship between the two UPenn chapters is unknown.) (Note: When this chapter went dormant in 1882, its members reestablished the dormant chapter of Delta Phi.)
Gamma	187x ? – 18xx ?, 1921–193x ?	Columbia University	New York City, New York	Inactive	
Delta	1878–1881, 1921–1931	City University of New York	New York City, New York	Inactive	(Note: The chapter was formed by absorbing Alpha Omega (local). It became the Phi Deuteron charge (i.e. chapter) of Theta Delta Chi in 1881, but was revived in 1921 as Delta Beta Phi (local).)
Epsilon	187x ? – 18xx ?	Harvard University	Cambridge, Massachusetts	Inactive	
	18xx ? – 188x ?	University of Michigan	Ann Arbor, Michigan	Inactive	
	18xx ? – 188x ?	Princeton University	Princeton, New Jersey	Inactive	(Note: The Princeton chapter was sub rosa.)
Iota	192x ? – 193x ?	DePaul University	Chicago, Illinois	Inactive	
Kappa		New York University	New York City, New York	Inactive	
Mu		Ohio State University	Columbus, Ohio	Inactive	
Nu		Northwestern University	Evanston, Illinois	Inactive	
Omicron	192x ? – 19xx ?	College of Dental and Oral Surgery of New York	New York City, New York	Inactive	(Note: College merged into Columbia.)
Pi	1881–188x ?	Johns Hopkins University	Baltimore, Maryland	Inactive	
Rho		University of Washington	Seattle, Washington	Inactive	
Sigma	June 1, 1879 – 1882	University of Pennsylvania Law School	Philadelphia, Pennsylvania	Withdrew	(Note: Baird's (1st edition), published in 1879, reported that this chapter was chartered in 1878.) (Note: The members of Sigma chapter were all Law School students. After withdrawing, the chapter revived the Eta chapter of Delta Phi fraternity in 1882.)
Phi	1878–1882	Lehigh University	Bethlehem, Pennsylvania	Inactive	(Note: Chapter was created by members of the defunct Society of Upsilon Beta, established in 1872.)
Chi	1923–1933	Crane College	Chicago, Illinois	Inactive	(Note: Chapter was formed by absorbing Beta Tau (local), established in 1923.)
Psi	November 1878 – 1881, 1882–1884	Lafayette College	Easton, Pennsylvania	Inactive	(Note: Chapter was formed by absorbing Nu Phi Mu (local), established in 1877.)
Psi	1881 ? – 188x ?	University of Virginia	Charlottesville, Virginia	Inactive	
Omega	September 1926–19xx ?	Stetson University	DeLand, Florida	Inactive	
	1886– xxxx ?	Kenyan College	Gambier, Ohio	Inactive	
	xxxx ? – 191x ?	Detroit Citywide	Detroit, Michigan	Inactive	(Note: There was possibly a connection between this chapter and the Alpha chapter at Cornell University as Oliver B. Hughes was an active alumnus of the latter who had a residence in with Detroit.)
	189x ? – xxxx ?	Hillhouse High School	New Haven, Connecticut	Inactive	(Note: Because this chapter formed in the gap between the national fraternity's dormancy and resurgence, it is unclear how it relates to the other chapters. New Haven appears to have been the location of three chapters, Hillhouse High School, Fair Haven community, and Yale. Social activities were held in Warner Hall on the campus of Yale.)
	1899 –xxxx ?	Fair Haven	Fair Haven, New Haven, Connecticut	Inactive	
	18xx ? – xxxx ?	Yale University	New Haven, Connecticut	Inactive	
	xxxx ? – 19xx ?	Albany High School	Albany, New York	Inactive	
	xxxx ? – 19xx ?	Delta Phi Alumni Association	Albany, New York	Inactive	
