= Sigma Alpha (professional sorority) =

Professional agricultural sorority

- ΣΑ
- Founded: January 26, 1978; 48 years ago Ohio State University
- Type: Professional
- Affiliation: PFA
- Status: Active
- Emphasis: Agriculture
- Scope: National
- Motto: "Cultivating Professional Women in Agriculture"
- Pillars: Scholarship, Leadership, Service, and Fellowship
- Colors: Emerald and Maize
- Flower: Yellow chrysanthemum
- Jewel: Emerald
- Mascot: Baby Bull
- Philanthropy: Agriculture in the Community
- Chapters: 71 active
- Members: 19,000+ lifetime
- Headquarters: P.O. Box 402; Hampton, Iowa 50441; United States
- Website: www.sigmaalpha.org

Sigma Alpha (ΣΑ) is an American professional sorority for agricultural students. It was established at Ohio State University in Columbus, Ohio in 1978 as a women's fraternity. The sorority has chartered more than 80 chapters in the United States.

== History ==
Sigma Alpha was first conceived on February 26, 1977, by Ohio State University students Marilyn Burns, Cindie Davis, Amy Matthews, Ann Huling Mathews, and Jennifer McMillan. On January 26, 1978, Sigma Alpha became an officially recognized as a student organization. It was established as a women's fraternity for agricultural students and to promote scholarship, leadership, and service.

In 1980, its five founders established a national board to oversee the Alpha chapter at Ohio State and to expand the sorority to other institutions. They also changed the fraternity's constitution to allow additional chapters. Beta chapter was chartered at Purdue University on April 14, 1984. Ten additional chapters followed between 1985 and May 1991.

The fraternity held its first annual national convention in 1985 in Columbus, Ohio. Since then, the national board has been elected at the annual conclave. By 1991, Sigma Alpha had 750 members. The organization was incorporated in the State of Ohio on April 8, 1991.

Sigma Alpha is a member of the Professional Fraternity Association (PFA), a national organization of professional Greek letter organizations. It also belongs to the Consortium of Collegiate Agricultural Organizations. As of 2024, more than 19,000 members have been initiated into Sigma Alpha, now called a professional sorority. The sorority's national headquarters are in Hampton, Iowa.

== Symbols ==
The fraternity was named Sigma Alpha for "Sisters in Agriculture". Its motto is "Cultivating Professional Women in Agriculture". Its pillars are Scholarship, Leadership, Service, and Fellowship.

Sigma Alpha's crest is diamond-shaped, with the top half being larger than its bottom. The Greek letters "ΣΑ" are located in the diamond, surrounded by an etching of a chrysanthemum to the right, a yoke to the left, and a sunrise and wheat shafts below. Above are two rows of Greek letters; the top consists of "ΗΒΜΔΜ" and the bottom row of "ΟΣΕ". At the bottom of the diamond are the Greek letters ΡΒ.

The fraternity's badge is like the crest, with the addition of an emerald in the four points of the diamond and pearls in between. Sigma Alpha's colors are emerald and maize. Its jewel is the emerald. Its flower is the yellow chrysanthemum. The sorority's mascot is a Perry, a baby bull.

The fraternity's original publication is Sigma Alpha News. In addition, Emerald & Maize was added in 1991 as a short administrative update from the national board. Its current newsletter is the Emerald Times.

== Collegiate chapters ==
Sigma Alpha has chartered more than 80 collegiate chapters in the United States; 71 are active as of 2024. It also has 20 active alumnae chapters.

== Philanthropy ==
The sorority's national philanthropy, Agriculture in the Community, provides members with a platform for public outreach and advocacy regarding the agricultural industry.

== See also ==
- Professional fraternities and sororities
