= Beta Psi =

American collegiate fraternity (1924–1935)

- ΒΨ
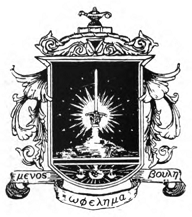
- Founded: July 19, 1924; 102 years ago University of Illinois
- Type: Social
- Affiliation: Independent
- Status: Defunct
- Defunct date: 1935
- Scope: National
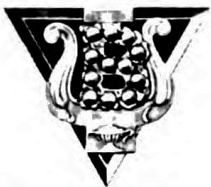
- Member badge
- Colors: Black and Gold
- Publication: The Lamp of Beta Psi
- Chapters: 5
- Members: 400+ lifetime
- Headquarters: Chicago, Illinois; United States

Beta Psi (ΒΨ) was a small American men's collegiate fraternity. It was founded in 1924 at the University of Illinois. Eventually chartering five chapters, it survived for about ten years until succumbing to the pressures of the Great Depression.

== History ==
Beta Psi's origin dates back to February 1920 when six male students formed a social fraternity in a junior college in Chicago, Illinois. When the members of this fraternity transferred to four-year colleges, they formed Mu Omega Beta at the University of Illinois and the Sodales Club at Armour Institute in 1922. In 1923 and 1924, respectively, these local fraternities received institutional permission to proceed with the formation of a national college fraternity. Beta Psi was formed on July 19, 1924.

Beta Psi dropped the junior college group. On August 29, 1924, the state of Illinois chartered the Beta Psi fraternity. The fraternity became national with the addition of the Delta Alpha chapter at Cornell University in 1925.

Beta Psi had chartered five chapters by 1928. All five chapters had houses, with the Alpha chapter owning its house that was valued at $75,000 ($1,445,468 in 2024 money) in 1930. By 1930, it had initiated 273 members and had an alumni association in Chicago. Membership was at 400 in 1934.

Too small and too young to survive the financial downturn of the Great Depression, it disbanded abruptly in 1934, with members and chapters dispersing that year. Its dissolution seems to have been rancorous. Twelve men from the Alpha chapter at Illinois sought a merger or absorption by the neighboring Alpha Sigma Phi chapter, whose building was under-occupied at the time. The local Interfraternity Conference, Beta Psi's headquarters, and the NIC sought to suppress this merger. The dispute forced Alpha Sigma Phi to leave the NIC for three years in 1935/36, rejoining in 1938. Some of the Alpha chapter men joined Pi Kappa Phi instead.

Beta chapter joined Pi Kappa Phi. The three other chapters scattered, with some individual members released de facto to join other groups, notably at Cornell University and at Middlebury College. None of Beta Psi's chapters survived beyond 1935.

== Symbols ==
Beta Psi's badge was an equilateral triangle of enameled black, surrounded by a gold border, with a point toward the bottom. This was superimposed by the Greek letters ΒΨ. The Ψ was somewhat encompassing, encompassing most of the triangle and rendered in polished gold. The Β was superimposed on this, set with twelve pearls. The pledge pin was a gilded shield in which is set a black equilateral triangle.

There is a crest shown in the 1927 Cornellian yearbook, which was used several times and appears to be original to the fraternity. The fraternity's colors were black and gold. Its magazine was The Lamp of Beta Psi, issued quarterly starting in 1923.

== Governance ==
Overall governance was by a Grand Council, an in-person meeting held bi-annually, composed of the council of administrators and two delegates from each chapter. In between Grand Councils, the council of administrators was composed of the president, secretary, treasurer, and four additional men, who together formed the governing body of the fraternity.

== Chapters ==
Following is a list of Beta Psi chapters.

Chapter	Charter date and range	Institution	Location	Status	Ref.
Alpha	July 19, 1924 – 1934	University of Illinois	Champaign, Illinois	Inactive	(Note: The predecessor to this society was an unnamed club formed at a junior college in 1920. The founders dispersed to Illinois and the Armor Institute. In Illinois, they formed Mu Omega Beta in 1922, and at the Armor Institute formed the Sodales Club in 1923. Already known to each other, these two local societies joined in the creation of Beta Psi as a new national fraternity.) (Note: Chapter absorbed the Pi Kappa Phi chapter at Illinois. The chapter closed with twelve members joining Alpha Sigma Phi and others joining Pi Kappa Phi.)
Beta	1924 – May 5, 1935	Armour Institute of Technology	Chicago, Illinois	Withdrew (ΠΚΦ)	(Note: Chapter formed from the Sodales Club, established in the spring of 1923. It became the Alpha Phi chapter of Pi Kappa Phi on May 5, 1935.)
Delta Alpha	1925–1935	Cornell University	Ithaca, New York	Inactive	
Delta Beta	1927–1934	Middlebury College	Middlebury, Vermont	Inactive	(Note: Chapter formed from Delta Sigma (local), established in 1926.)
Gamma	1928–1932	Lake Forest College	Lake Forest, Illinois	Inactive	(Note: Chapter formed from Beta Psi Gamma (local), established in 1928.)

== See also ==
- List of social fraternities
