= Phi Lambda Kappa =

International professional medical fraternity

- ΦΛΚ
- Founded: 1907; 119 years ago University of Pennsylvania
- Type: Professional
- Former affiliation: PFA
- Status: Unknown
- Emphasis: Medical
- Scope: International
- Colors: Blue and White
- Jewel: Ruby
- Publication: The Quarterly
- Chapters: 41
- Members: 4,800+ lifetime
- Headquarters: Philadelphia, Pennsylvania 19107; United States

Phi Lambda Kappa (ΦΛΚ) was an international professional medical fraternity that was founded at the University of Pennsylvania in 1907.

== History ==
The fraternity, founded as a local of this same name in 1907 at the University of Pennsylvania, grew into a national of 41 chapters and 4,800 members as of 1977.

The fraternity evolved through consolidation, becoming what it termed "the eastern branch" of an expanded Phi Lambda Kappa by adding Aleph Yodh He (איה), a national formed in 1908 which it then called its western branch. Aleph Yodh He had been formed at the University of Illinois at Chicago in 1908, and by the time of the merger had chartered nine chapters and claimed 350 members. A third fraternity joined this consolidation, the local chapter named Zeta Phi Mu at Loyola of Chicago, which had been established in 1912 (earlier?). These moves were an outcome of a planned consolidation of Jewish medical fraternities. The amalgamation produced a combined twelve chapters as the outcome of its organizational meeting in Pittsburgh in 1922; some of these may have combined where existing at the same school. The names Aleph Yodh He and Zeta Phi Mu were retired in 1922, the organization taking the national name of Phi Lambda Kappa.

In 1924, the policy was changed to allow graduate members to hold national office. At the 1952 convention, the constitution was altered to make the fraternity non-sectarian.

== Symbols ==
The fraternity's badge was a diamond-shaped with a field of blue. In the upper corner of the field, it had a skull and crossbones, filled in white. The letters ΦΛΚ are set in gold at the midline, and below these is a six-pointed star, also filled in white. The corners of the badge are set with rubies, and the sides with pearls - four pearls on each side.

The colors of the society were blue and white.

== Chapters ==
Following is a list of Phi Lambda Kappa chapters as of 1991. Active chapters are listed in bold; inactive chapters and institutions are in italics.

| Chapter | Charter date and range | Institution | Location | Status | Ref. |
|---|---|---|---|---|---|
| **Alpha** | 1907 | Perelman School of Medicine at the University of Pennsylvania | Philadelphia, Pennsylvania | Active | (Note: This was the original Phi Lambda Kappa Alpha chapter.) |
| **Alpha Alpha** | 1908 | University of Illinois Chicago | Chicago, Illinois | Active | (Note: This chapter formed the Beta chapter of Aleph Yodh (Zeta Mu Phi) as part of a national merger of the two fraternities.) |
| **Beta** | 1909 | Thomas Jefferson University Sidney Kimmel Medical College | Philadelphia, Pennsylvania | Active | |
| Delta | 1912 | Rush Medical College | Chicago, Illinois | Inactive | |
| **Gamma** | 1912 | Loyola University Chicago Stritch School of Medicine | Chicago, Illinois | Active | (Note: This chapter formed the Delta chapter of Aleph Yodh (Zeta Mu Phi) as part of a national merger of the two fraternities.) |
| Epsilon | 1914 | Northwestern University Feinberg School of Medicine | Streeterville, Chicago, Illinois | Inactive | |
| **Eta** | 1919 | Bellevue Hospital Medical College (now New York University Grossman School of Medicine) | New York, New York | Active | |
| Theta | 1919 | Long Island College Hospital | Brooklyn, New York | Inactive | (Note: Long Island Hospital College became the University Hospital of Brooklyn at Long Island College Hospital. It ceased operations in August 2014.) |
| Zeta | 1919 | Columbia University Vagelos College of Physicians and Surgeons | Manhattan, New York | Inactive | |
| **Iota** | 1920 | Tufts University School of Medicine | Boston, Massachusetts | Active | |
| **Kappa** | 1920 | University at Buffalo School of Medicine and Biomedical Sciences | Buffalo, New York | Active | |
| Mu | 1922 | University of Pittsburgh School of Medicine | Pittsburgh, Pennsylvania | Inactive | |
| **Nu** | 1922 | Boston University School of Medicine | Boston, Massachusetts | Active | |
| Omicron (see Alpha Kappa) | 1922 | Cornell University Medical School | New York City, New York | Inactive, Reassigned | |
| **Omicron** | | Wayne State University School of Medicine | Detroit, Michigan | Active | |
| Pi | 1922 | University of Michigan Medical School | Ann Arbor, Michigan. | Inactive | |
| Xi | 1922 | University of Maryland | Baltimore, Maryland | Inactive | (Note: Chapter formed from the Theta chapter of Aleph Yodh He, established in 1914, when the two fraternities merged at the national level.) |
| Rho | 1923 | George Washington University School of Medicine and Health Sciences | Washington, D.C. | Inactive | |
| Sigma | 1923 | University of Virginia School of Medicine | Charlottesville, Virginia | Inactive | |
| Chi | 1924 | Albany Medical College | Albany, New York | Inactive | |
| Phi | 1924 | Georgetown University School of Medicine | Washington, D.C. | Inactive | |
| **Psi** | 1924 | Tulane University School of Medicine | New Orleans, Louisiana | Active | |
| Tau | 1924 | Saint Louis University School of Medicine | St. Louis, Missouri | Inactive | |
| **Upsilon** | 1924 | University of Virginia School of Medicine | Charlottesville, Virginia | Active | |
| Lambda | 1925 | Yale University School of Medicine | New Haven, Connecticut | Inactive | |
| Omega | 1925 | University of Tennessee College of Medicine | Memphis, Tennessee | Inactive | |
| **Alpha Gamma** | 1926 | Case Western Reserve University School of Medicine | Cleveland, Ohio | Active | |
| Alpha Beta | 1926 | Hahnemann Medical College of Philadelphia | Philadelphia, Pennsylvania | Inactive | |
| Alpha Delta | 1927 | Harvard University Medical School | Boston, Massachusetts | Inactive | |
| Alpha Epsilon | 1927 | University of Kansas School of Medicine | Kansas City, Kansas | Inactive | |
| Alpha Eta | 1927 | Washington University School of Medicine | St. Louis County, and Clayton, Missouri | Inactive | |
| Alpha Zeta | 1927 | Medical University of South Carolina | Charleston, South Carolina | Inactive | |
| Alpha Iota | 1928 | Temple University School of Medicine | Philadelphia, Pennsylvania | Inactive | |
| Alpha Kappa | 1928 | Cornell University Graduate School of Medical Sciences | New York City, New York | Inactive | |
| Alpha Theta | 1928 | Ohio State University College of Medicine | Columbus, Ohio | Inactive | |
| **Alpha Mu** | 1929 | New York University School of Medicine | New York City, New York | Active | |
| Alpha Nu | 1930 | University of Louisville School of Medicine | Louisville, Kentucky | Inactive | |
| Alpha Lambda | 1933 | University of California | | Inactive | |
| Alpha Xi | 1933 | Baylor University College of Medicine | Houston, Texas | Inactive | |
| Alpha Omicron | 1936 | Louisiana State University | Baton Rouge, Louisiana | Inactive | |
| **Alpha Rho** | 1939 | Chicago Medical School | North Chicago, Illinois | Active | |
| **Hebrew** | 1949 | Hebrew University of Jerusalem Hadassah Medical Center | Jerusalem, Israel | Active | |

== See also ==
- List of Jewish fraternities and sororities
- Professional fraternities and sororities
