= Block and Bridle =

Animal husbandry fraternity

- Founded: December 2, 1919; 106 years ago Chicago, Illinois
- Type: Professional and Social
- Affiliation: Independent
- Status: Active
- Emphasis: Animal husbandry
- Scope: National
- Colors: Royal Purple and Navy Blue
- Symbol: Meat block and cleaver, bridle
- Flower: Lilac
- Chapters: 99
- Headquarters: Janeal Yancey, PhD (editor); University of Arkansas; 1120 West Maple; AFLS B121; Fayetteville, Arkansas 72701; United States
- Website: www.blockandbridle.org

Block and Bridle is a professional fraternity in the field of animal husbandry. It was founded on December 2, 1919, in Chicago, Illinois by the animal husbandry clubs from Iowa State University, University of Kansas, University of Missouri and University of Nebraska. As of 2019, Block and Bridle has 99 active chapters.

== History ==
The National Block and Bridle Club was founded on December 2, 1919 in Chicago, Illinois by the animal husbandry clubs from Iowa State University, the University of Kansas, the University of Missouri, and the University of Nebraska. It was created as a professional fraternity in the field of animal husbandry. Its founders wanted to "promote a higher scholastic standard among students of animal husbandry, especially all phases of student animal husbandry work in colleges and universities; and to bring about a closer relationship between students, faculty, and others engaged in animal husbandry."

As of 2019, Block and Bridle has 99 active chapters.

== Symbols ==
The badge of Block and Bridle is a large letter "B" with a meat block and cleaver inside the upper half and a bridle inside the lower half. The curves in the "B' represent social pleasure. The straight line of the "B" symbolizes character, sincerity, and a moral life. The block and cleaver symbolize the material aspects of the animal husbandry profession. The bridle symbolizes control of behavior and the effort to show respect for others and for the way livestock are treated.

The society's colors are royal purple and navy blue. Its flower is the lilac.

== Chapters ==
As of 2019, Block and Bridle has 99 active chapters.
