= Delta Sigma Theta (professional) =

International pharmacy fraternity

- ΔΣΘ
- Founded: Fall 1914; 112 years ago Brooklyn College of Pharmacy
- Type: Professional
- Affiliation: Independent
- Status: Defunct
- Emphasis: Pharmacy
- Scope: International
- Chapters: 18
- Members: 24,000+ lifetime
- Headquarters: New York City, New York; United States

Delta Sigma Theta (ΔΣΘ) was an international pharmacy fraternity founded in the fall of 1914. It was created to promote the healing arts of pharmacy, medicine, and dentistry. The fraternity went inactive sometime after 2021, with Chi Chapter in St. Louis as the last active chapter.

== History ==
In the fall of 1914, Delta Sigma Theta was established at Brooklyn College of Pharmacy as an outgrowth of the Mortar and Pestle club (local). It was created to promote the healing arts of pharmacy, medicine, and dentistry. There were six founders led by A. Bertram Lemon. The organization was started on December 11, 1915, and one year later was incorporated in New York State as Alpha chapter of Delta Sigma Theta.

The fraternity then expanded within New York and across New England. It also expanded to include other healthcare professions, including medicine and dentistry. Some notable chapters founded during this era include Rutgers' Epsilon chapter and Columbia's Delta chapter. By 1926, it had eight chapters and 700 members.

By the late 1920s, Delta Sigma Theta became an international fraternity by establishing chapters in Beirut, Rome, and Great Britain. The growing fraternity paused in its growth like other such societies when the start of World War II led to a decrease in fraternity enrollment nationwide. However, once the war concluded, Delta Sigma Theta expanded westward; the Chi chapter was founded in May 1963 by a Mu chapter alumnus, Alfonso Tobias. However Chi was its last chapter to be established and, in 1963, it had six active chapters and eleven inactive chapters. Eventually, all chapters ceased operations and the fraternity went defunct.

== Governance ==
Delta Sigma Theta was governed by a Supreme Royal Council, elected at an annual national convention. Its officers include a supreme royal chancellor, supreme royal vice chancellor, supreme royal scribe, supreme royal assistant scribe, supreme royal treasurer, supreme royal assistant treasurer, supreme royal historian, and a supreme royal sentinel. Its national headquarters were in New York City, New York.

== Chapters ==
In the following list, inactive chapters and institutions are in italics.

Chapter	Charter date and range	Institution	Location	Status	Ref.
Alpha	1917–xxxx ?	St. Louis College of Pharmacy	Brooklyn, New York	Inactive	(Note: Chapter formed at the Brooklyn College of Pharmacy, now St. Louis College of Pharmacy.)
Beta	1917–19xx ?	Columbia University College of Dental Medicine	Manhattan, New York City, New York	Inactive	
Gamma	1917–19xx ?	New York University College of Dentistry	New York City, New York	Inactive	
Delta	1923–c. 1976	Columbia University College of Pharmaceutical Sciences	New York City, New York	Inactive	(Note: Columbia University closed its pharmacy school in 1976.)
Epsilon	1924–xxxx ?	Ernest Mario School of Pharmacy	New Brunswick, New Jersey	Inactive	(Note: Chapter formed at the Rutgers College of Pharmacy, now the Ernest Mario School of Pharmacy.)
Zeta	1924–19xx ?,	University of Pennsylvania School of Dental Medicine	Philadelphia, Pennsylvania	Inactive	
Eta	1924–19xx ?	New York Flowers Hospital Medical	Valhalla, New York	Inactive	
Theta	1924–19xx ?	Tufts University School of Medicine	Boston, Massachusetts	Inactive	
Iota	1924–19xx ?	Temple University School of Dentistry	Philadelphia, Pennsylvania	Inactive	
Kappa	1924–19xx ?	Long Island University - School of Medicine	Long Island, New York	Inactive	
Lambda	1924–19xx ?	Massachusetts College of Pharmacy and Health Sciences	Boston, Massachusetts	Inactive	
Mu	1927	St. John's University College of Pharmacy and Health Science	Brooklyn, New York	Inactive ?	
Rho	1927–19xx ?	University of Rome Medical College	Rome Italy	Inactive	
Sigma	1927–19xx ?	American University of Beirut	Beirut, Lebanon	Inactive	
Tau	1927–19xx ?	Edinburgh Medical College	Edinburgh, Scotland	Inactive	
Omega	1953	Northeastern University School of Pharmacy	Boston, Massachusetts	Inactive ?	(Note: Chapter formed at the New England College of Pharmacy, which merged with Northeastern University to become the Northeastern University College of Pharmacy in 1962.)
Phi	1958–c. 1960s	Hampden College of Pharmacy	Chicopee, Massachusetts	Consolidated	(Note: The chapter consolidated with Lambda chapter when the Hampden College of Pharmacy closed and was absorbed by the Massachusetts College of Pharmacy and Health Sciences.)
Chi	1963–2021	University of Health Sciences and Pharmacy in St. Louis	St. Louis, Missouri	Inactive	(Note: Chapter was formed at the St. Louis College of Pharmacy, now the University of Health Sciences and Pharmacy in St. Louis.)

== See also ==
- Professional fraternities and sororities
- Rho Chi, co-ed, pharmacy honor society
