= List of Alpha Tau Alpha chapters =

Alpha Tau Alpha is a co-ed professional honorary agricultural education organization for students majoring in agricultural education or agriculture extension. In the following list, active chapters are indicated in bold and inactive chapters are indicated in italics.

Chapter	Charter date and range	Institution	Location	Status	Ref.
**Alpha**	October 27, 1921 – 1941, 1946	University of Illinois Urbana-Champaign	Urbana, Illinois	Active	
**Beta**	April 11, 1925 – 1956; 19xx ?	University of Nebraska	Lincoln, Nebraska	Active	
Gamma	April 18, 1925 – 1926; May 4, 1951–19xx ?	University of California, Davis	Davis, California	Inactive ?	
Delta (First)	July 12, 1928 – 1936	Peabody College School of Agriculture	Nashville, Tennessee	Inactive, Reissued	(Note: When the School of Agriculture was closed in 1936, the chapter became inactive.)
Delta (Second)	August 31, 1939 – 19xx ?	University of Tennessee	Knoxville, Tennessee	Inactive, Reissued	
Delta (Third)	March 28, 1950 – 1958	Tennessee Polytechnic Institute	Cookeville, Tennessee	Inactive	(Note: The school discontinued its vocational agriculture training program for teachers.)
**Epsilon**	July 9, 1929 – 1964, xxxx ?	University of Florida	Gainesville, Florida	Active	(Note: The chapter's last initiation was in November 1963.)
**Zeta**	February 22, 1930	Colorado State University	Fort Collins, Colorado	Active	
Eta	March 9, 1931 – xxxx ?	Pennsylvania State University	University Park, Pennsylvania	Inactive	
Theta (see Beta Eta)	August 3, 1931 – 1949	University of Wyoming	Laramie, Wyoming	Inactive	
Iota	February 6, 1932 – xxxx ?	Louisiana State University	Baton Rouge, Louisiana	Inactive	
Kappa	May 28, 1932 – xxxx ?	Clemson University	Clemson, South Carolina	Inactive ?	
Lambda	April 14, 1933 – 1941	Arkansas State Teachers College Agriculture Education Department	Conway, Arkansas	Inactive	(Note: The chapter went inactive when the School of Agriculture Education Department closed.)
**Mu**	January 29, 1934	Texas A&M University–Kingsville	Kingsville, Texas	Active	
**Nu**	May 18, 1934 – 20xx ?	University of Missouri	Columbia, Missouri	Inactive	
**Xi**	March 25, 1935 – 1980, xxxx ?	Illinois State University	Normal, Illinois	Active	(Note: The chapter's last initiation was in October 1980.)
Omicron	May 13, 1938 – 1956; March 3, 1978 – 1983	Mississippi State University	Starkville, Mississippi	Inactive	(Note: The chapter's last initiation was in March 1983.)
Pi	April 4, 1940 – 1972	New Mexico State University	Las Cruces, New Mexico	Inactive	(Note: The chapter's last initiation was in May 1972.)
Rho	May 11, 1940 – December 1954	University of Puerto Rico	Mayagüez, Puerto Rico	Inactive	(Note: The chapter went inactive because it had difficulties attending National Conclaves and keeping in touch with the mainland chapters.)
Sigma	November 11, 1950 – 201x ?	Utah State University	Logan, Utah	Inactive	
**Tau**	April 5, 1950	West Virginia University Davs College of Agriculture, Natural Resources and Design	Morgantown, West Virginia	Active	
Upsilon	January 27, 1951 – 1981	Washington State University	Pullman, Washington	Inactive	(Note: The chapter's last initiation was in April 1981.)
**Phi**	June 16, 1951	University of Arizona	Tucson, Arizona	Active	
Chi	October 19, 1954 – xxxx ?	University of Arkansas	Fayetteville, Arkansas	Inactive	
Psi	April 15, 1955 – xxxx ?	Southern University and A&M College	Baton Rouge, Louisiana	Inactive	
Eta-A	November 16, 1957 – 1967	University of the Philippines College of Agriculture,	Los Banos, Laguna, Philappines	Inactive	(Note: The chapter's last initiation was in October 1966.)
Omega	November 5, 1962 – 1979	Purdue University	West Lafayette, Indiana	Inactive	(Note: The chapter's last initiation was in October 1979.)
**Alpha Alpha**	April 9, 1963	University of Minnesota	Saint Paul, Minnesota	Active	
**Alpha Beta**	October 30, 1963	Oklahoma State University	Stillwater, Oklahoma	Active	(Note: Locally, the chapter is also known as Collegiate FFA.)
**Alpha Gamma**	November 9, 1964	Arkansas State University	Jonesboro, Arkansas	Active	
Alpha Delta	February 15, 1965 – xxxx ?	Kansas State University	Manhattan, Kansas	Inactive	
Alpha Epsilon	April 15, 1966 – 1980	University of Arkansas at Pine Bluff	Pine Bluff, Arkansas	Inactive	(Note: The chapter's last initiation was in May 1980.)
Alpha Zeta	April 1, 1968 – 1981	Rutgers University	New Brunswick, New Jersey	Inactive	(Note: The chapter's last initiation was in May 1981.)
Alpha Eta	February 5, 1969 – xxxx ?	Prairie View A&M University	Prairie View, Texas	Inactive	
Alpha Theta	June 3, 1969 – 1976	Florida A&M University	Tallahassee, Florida	Inactive	(Note: The chapter's last initiation was in April 1976.)
Alpha Iota	April 30, 1971 – 1978	University of Maryland Eastern Shore	Princess Anne, Maryland	Inactive	(Note: The chapter's last initiation was in May 1978.)
Alpha Kappa	October 12, 1971 – 197x ?; 1976–1983	California State University, Fresno	Fresno, California	Inactive	(Note: The chapter's last initiation was in November 1982.)
**Alpha Lambda**	April 15, 1972	Virginia Tech	Blacksburg, Virginia	Active	(Note: Chapter formed from The Ag Ed Society (local), established in the 1960s.)
**Alpha Mu**	October 12, 1972	University of Wisconsin–River Falls	River Falls, Wisconsin	Active	
Alpha Nu	May 7, 1973 – xxxx ?	Alcorn State University	Lorman, Mississippi	Inactive	
**Alpha Xi**	December 7, 1973	North Carolina A&T State University	Greensboro, North Carolina	Active	
**Alpha Omicron**	November 12, 1975	South Dakota State University	Brookings, South Dakota	Active	
Alpha Pi	April 16, 1977 – xxxx ?	Fort Valley State University	Fort Valley, Georgia	Inactive	
**Alpha Rho**	April 26, 1979	Northwest Missouri State University	Maryville, Missouri	Active	
Alpha Sigma	November 7, 1979 – 1984	Auburn University	Auburn, Alabama	Inactive	(Note: The chapter's last initiation was in June 1984.)
Alpha Tau	April 10, 1980 – 20xx ?	North Carolina State University	Raleigh, North Carolina	Inactive	
**Alpha Upsilon**	February 25, 1983	California Polytechnic State University, San Luis Obispo	San Luis Obispo, California	Active	
**Alpha Phi**	February 26, 1988	Iowa State University	Ames, Iowa	Active	(Note: This chapter is called Agricultural Education Club on campus.)
Alpha Chi (See Beta Iota)	c. 1996–xxxx ?	Texas State University	San Marcos, Texas	Inactive	
**Alpha Psi**	c. 1996	University of Georgia	Athens, Georgia	Active	
**Alpha Omega**	1996	Southern Arkansas University	Magnolia, Arkansas	Active	
**Beta Alpha**		Murray State University	Murray, Kentucky	Active	
**Beta Beta**		Southern Illinois University Carbondale	Carbondale, Illinois	Active	(Note: On campus, this chapter is also called the Agricultural Education Association.)
Beta Gamma				Inactive	
**Beta Delta**		University of Kentucky	Lexington, Kentucky	Active	
**Beta Epsilon**		Oregon State University	Corvallis, Oregon	Active	
Beta Zeta				Inactive	
**Beta Eta** (See Theta)	19xx ?	University of Wyoming	Laramie, Wyoming	Active	
Beta Theta	xxxx ?–201x ?	Texas A&M University	College Station, Texas	Inactive ?	
Beta Iota (See Alpha Chi)		Texas State University	San Marcos, Texas	Inactive ?	
**Beta Kappa**		Tennessee State University	Nashville, Tennessee	Active	
Beta Lambda		University of Wisconsin–Platteville	Platteville, Wisconsin	Inactive ?	
**Beta Mu**		Middle Tennessee State University	Murfreesboro, Tennessee	Active	
**Beta Nu**		Morningside University	Sioux City, Iowa	Active	
