= KTP =

KTP or KTp may refer to:

- Karl Parker (1895–1992), British art historian
- Kartu Tanda Penduduk, the Indonesian identity card
- Kentucky Truck Plant, Ford Motor Company manufacturing plant also known as Kentucky Truck Assembly
- Kissing the Pink, English new wave and synth-pop band
- Kitchen table polyamory, a style of polyamory
- Knowledge Transfer Partnerships, a British government-funded programme

== Organizations ==
- Kappa Theta Pi, a professional fraternity found in University of Michigan
- Kommunistinen Työväenpuolue – Rauhan ja Sosialismin puolesta, a communist party in Finland
- Kotkan Työväen Palloilijat, Finnish football club
- Kristian Thalai Pâwl, an organisation of the Mizoram Presbyterian Church Synod

== Sciences ==
- Potassium trispyrazolylborate, a chemical compound
- Potassium titanyl phosphate, an inorganic crystal

== See also ==
- FC KooTeePee
