= Epsilon Psi Epsilon =

American optometry fraternity

- ΕΨΕ
- Founded: May 3, 1911; 115 years ago Columbia University
- Type: Professional
- Affiliation: Independent
- Status: Active
- Emphasis: Optometry
- Scope: Local
- Member badge
- Colors: Blue and White
- Flower: Iris
- Publication: O-EYE-O
- Chapters: 1 active, 6 chartered
- Headquarters: 275 E. 15th Columbus, Ohio 43201; United States
- Website: epsie.org

Epsilon Psi Epsilon (ΕΨΕ) was the first collegiate, professional fraternity for students of optometry. It continues today as a local organization on the Ohio State University campus.

== History ==
Epsilon Psi Epsilon was formed May 3, 1911 at Columbia University in New York City, by three members of the first class of optometry to be taught at Columbia. It was the first collegiate, professional fraternity formed to serve the emerging field; Phi Omicron, a short-lived society of practicing optometrists, had formed in 1904, but appears to have been dormant by the time Epsilon Psi Epsilon was created in 1911. Epsilon Psi Epsilon's Founders were:

- T.C. Rath
- Harold Eames
- Albert McConnell

From the beginning, the fraternity's organizers sought to create a collegiate, professional fraternity, resulting in a mission statement that has been unchanged since it was written in 1911:

The Fraternity shall be known as Epsilon Psi Epsilon Fraternity, and shall have for its objectives the pursuit and cultivation of the practice of optometry and the sciences on which the same is based, together with the defense of the rights and elevation of the dignity of the optometric profession.

Dr. Rees Ellis of Alpha chapter transferred to Ohio State University, there completing his BS in applied optics in the class of 1923. Under his leadership, the Beta chapter at Ohio State was formed and was installed on March 27, 1920. The history of the chapter records that there were thirteen charter members out of a total of seventeen in the applied optics program that year. The program would later be named the School of Optometry.

One year later, in 1921, Gamma chapter was formed at the University of Rochester, in Rochester, New York, when twelve charter members were initiated. At least six chapters were eventually established by the end of the fraternity's second decade.

=== Closures ===
The Columbia chapter met its demise in 1924, thirteen years after its establishment. The Rochester chapter flourished for twelve years, but was closed with the discontinuation of the Rochester School of Optometry. The fraternity's history explains that "quickly evolving state rules" for optometry led to reduced student populations in some programs and even school closures, which negatively affected the expansion prospects of the fraternity.

=== Ohio State chapter stability ===
The other, younger, chapters similarly floundered, leaving only Beta chapter to carry on the Epsilon Psi Epsilon name. But unlike the other chapters, the Ohio State group enjoyed a very solid foundation, surviving the Great Depression serving students of a popular Optometry program at OSU and with healthy finances. Thus Beta chapter and its alumni club have for many years been the successors in all aspects to the national Fraternity.

A series of properties have served the Beta chapter, with its first home purchased at 76 East 12th Avenue in Columbus. Growing need for residential services prompted the members to sell this home and move to the nearby 58 East 12th Avenue home in Columbus, which offered 50% more space, a building purchased by the alumni on January 20, 1952. A few years later, another nearby home became available and was purchased, at 50 East 12th Avenue in Columbus. For three decades, these two properties served the fraternity until it was determined to house all members in a single, even larger building.

The current home of the thriving chapter, which averages 100 active members, is situated at 275 East 15th Avenue in Columbus, purchased in 1980. The Fraternity's earlier properties were sold. The kitchen and common areas were remodeled in approximately 2018.

== Symbols ==
The Fraternity's flower is the Iris. Its colors are Blue and White. The Ohio State chapter publishes a quarterly journal called the O-EYE-O.

== Activities ==
The fraternity maintains a Vision Care Fund which allows practicing local optometrists to provide low vision equipment for up to six students annually from the Ohio State School for the Blind.

== Chapters ==
Chapters of ΕΨΕ include the following. Active chapters are noted in bold, inactive chapters noted in italics.

Chapter	Charter date and range	Institution	Location	Status	Ref.
Alpha	May 3, 1911 – 1924	Columbia University	New York City	Inactive	(Note: The Optical Journal, vol 30, 1912, notes that a publication called the Columbia [University] Blue Book lists the Alpha chapter of this small fraternity residing at 422 W. 115th St. in New York City, which had been established two years earlier in 1910.) (Note: The Alpha chapter closed in 1924; Columbia's optometry program closed in 1954. (OSU Optometry History))
**Beta**	March 27, 1920	Ohio State University	Columbus, Ohio	Active	
Gamma	1921–1933	University of Rochester	Rochester, New York	Inactive	(Note: The Rochester School of Optometry closed in 1933.)
Delta ?	After 1921–19xx ?			Inactive	
Epsilon ?	After 1921–19xx ?			Inactive	
Zeta ?	After 1921–19xx ?			Inactive	

== Other optometric professional fraternities ==
As previously stated, optometric regulations changed rapidly, leading to the abrupt opening and closing of schools during the first half of the 20th Century.

The first non-collegiate Professional Optometric Fraternity was Phi Omicron. The first collegiate Professional Optometric Fraternity was Epsilon Psi Epsilon. Other Greek Letter organizations emerging to serve the rapidly evolving field include the following, assumed to be locals and the schools where they were founded. As mergers of similar societies were common throughout the 1930s, some may have later become chapters of Epsilon Psi Epsilon:

- August 2, 1904 - Phi Omicron, professional, non-collegiate - American Association of Opticians - soon dormant
- 1911 - Epsilon Psi Epsilon, professional, collegiate - (Columbia)
- 1912 - Pi Omicron Sigma, professional, collegiate - (MSO)
- 1917 - Omega Delta, professional, collegiate - (NICO)
- 1919 - Gamma Omega Phi, professional, collegiate - (PSCO)
- October 12, 1919 - Omega Epsilon Phi, professional, collegiate - (Columbia; 10 chapters, 2,000 initiates by 1950.)
- 1920 - Phi Theta Epsilon, professional, collegiate - (PSCO)
- <1923 - Mu Delta Pi, professional, collegiate - (Rochester SO)
- <1923 - Omega Pi Tau, professional, collegiate - (Rochester SO)
- 1925 - Phi Theta Upsilon, professional, collegiate - (ICOO)
- 1928 - Pi Kappa Rho, professional, collegiate - (NICO)
- 1932 - Mu Sigma Pi, professional, collegiate - (NICO)
- 1932 - Omega Beta Sigma, professional, collegiate - (LACO, TAQ)
- 1932 - Omicron Delta Epsilon, professional, collegiate - (PSCO)
- 1934 - Phi Beta Rho, women's professional, collegiate - (PSCO)
- 1940 - Phi Omicron Sigma, women's professional, collegiate - (OSU, TAQ)
- 1975 - Gamma Omicron, professional, collegiate - (SCO)

== See also ==
- Professional fraternities and sororities
