= Professional fraternities and sororities =

Fellowship groups for a specific field

Professional fraternities, in the North American fraternity system, are organizations whose primary purpose is to promote the interests of a particular profession and whose membership is restricted to students in that particular field of professional education or study. This may be contrasted with service fraternities and sororities, whose primary purpose is community service, and social fraternities and sororities, whose primary purposes are generally aimed towards some other aspect, such as the development of character, friendship, leadership, or literary ability.

Professional fraternities are often confused with honor societies because of their focus on a specific discipline. Professional fraternities are significantly different from honor societies in that honor societies are associations designed to provide recognition of the past achievement of those who are invited to membership. Honor society membership, in most cases, requires no period of pledging, and new candidates may be immediately inducted into membership after meeting predetermined academic criteria and paying a one-time membership fee. Because of their purpose of recognition, most honor societies will have much higher academic achievement requirements for membership.

Professional fraternities, on the other hand, work to build brotherhood among members and cultivate the strengths of members to promote their profession and to provide assistance to one another in their mutual areas of professional study. Membership in a professional fraternity may be the result of a pledge process, much like a social fraternity, and members are expected to remain loyal and active in the organization for life. Within their professional field of study, their membership is exclusive; however, they may initiate members who belong to other types of fraternities.

== History ==
The first professional fraternity was founded at Transylvania University in Lexington, Kentucky in 1819: the Kappa Lambda Society of Aesculapius, established to bring together students of the medical profession. The fraternity lasted until about 1858.

Of the professional fraternities still in existence, the oldest is Phi Delta Phi founded at the University of Michigan in 1869; however, Phi Delta Phi changed its mission in 2012 to become an honor society for law school students.

== Title IX applied to professional fraternities ==
In the United States fraternity system, professional fraternities are usually co-educational in accordance with Federal Title IX of the Education Amendments of 1972 (commonly referred to as "Title IX"). This federal law discourages discrimination based on sex in any college or university receiving federal financial assistance. However, the membership practices of social fraternities and sororities are exempt from Title IX in section (A)(6)(a). The U.S. Department of Education (DOE) regulations adopted under Title IX also allow such an exception for "the membership practices of social fraternities and sororities." (34 C.F.R. Sec. 106.14(a)).

Before Title IX, many professional fraternities were all male, and most professional sororities/women's fraternities were all female. Several of these professional fraternities and sororities even considered themselves both professional and social organizations because they often emphasized the social aspects of their activities. During the ensuing years since the enactment of Title IX, single-sex professional fraternities and sororities became coeducational to conform to Title IX. Several organizations simply opened their membership to both men and women. For example, Phi Chi (medicine) opened membership to women in 1973; Phi Beta (music and speech) opened membership to men in 1976; and Delta Omicron (music) opened membership to men in 1979. A few single-sex groups merged with other organizations, such as Phi Delta Delta, a women's professional law fraternity, which merged with Phi Alpha Delta (law) in 1972.

Even though Title IX was enacted in 1972, there are still professional fraternities and sororities or their chapters that have not become coeducational and therefore, do not conform to Title IX. Generally, these groups still claim to be both professional and social organizations, for instance, Alpha Gamma Rho (men in agriculture), Alpha Omega Epsilon (women in engineering), and Sigma Phi Delta (men in engineering).

Several social fraternities and sororities have membership practices of selecting their members primarily from students enrolled in particular majors or areas of study, including Phi Mu Alpha Sinfonia, Phi Sigma Rho, and Triangle. Nevertheless, these groups are social, rather than professional, organizations. Although they select members from students in a particular field of study, like a professional fraternity, they are single-sex social organizations because their purposes focus only on the social development of their members. Examples of groups that have been officially granted exemption from Title IX by the DOE to remain single-sex include Sigma Alpha Iota in 1981 and Phi Mu Alpha Sinfonia in 1983.

== Umbrella organizations ==
Many professional fraternities, particularly those of the highest esteem and reputation, are members of the Professional Fraternity Association (PFA). This group resulted in 1978 from a merger of the Professional Interfraternity Conference (PIC) (for men's group) and the Professional Panhellenic Association (PPA) (for women's groups). In 2013, faced with an increase in campus policies that require student organizations to take all students, the PFA adopted a resolution against All Comers policies.

== List of professional fraternities ==
=== Arts, literature, and media ===
Name	Symbols	Charter date and range	Emphasis	Scope	Type	Status	Ref.
Delta Chi Xi	ΔΧΞ	2010	Dance	National (US)	Fraternity, coed	Active	
Delta Iota Mu	ΔΙΜ	2008	Performing arts, African American		Fraternity, coed	Active	
Delta Kappa Phi	ΔΚΦ	1899	Textiles	Local, Lowell Textile School	Fraternity	Active	(Note: Previously had six chapters in five U.S. states.)
Delta Kappa Alpha	ΔΚΑ	1936	Cinema	National (US)	Gender Inclusive	Active	
Delta Omicron Omega	ΔΟΩ	April 13, 2007	Performing arts, African American	Regional (Illinois)	Fraternity	Active	
Delta Phi Delta	ΔΦΔ	January 18, 2000	Dance, African American	National (US)	Fraternity, coed	Active	
Eta Phi Sigma	ΗΦΣ	1981	Arts, African American		Sorority	Inactive	
Gamma Epsilon Tau	ΓΕΤ	1953	Graphic artists honor society	National (US)	Fraternity, coed	Active	
Gamma Xi Phi	ΓΞΦ	October 7, 2010	Artists and creators, African American	National (US)	Fraternity, coed	Active	
Lambda Phi Delta	ΛΦΔ	1917	Fine arts	National (US)	Sorority	Inactive	
Lambda Phi Lambda	ΛΦΛ	1990	Fine arts, African American		Sorority	Inactive ?	
Nu Rho Sigma Eta Beta Mu	ΝΡΣΗΒΜ	2005	Fine arts, African American		Fraternity		
Omega Xi Alpha	ΟΞΑ	1928	Journalism	Regional	Fraternity	Inactive	
Phi Alpha Tau	ΦΑΤ	1902	Communicative arts	Local, Emerson College	Fraternity	Active	
Phi Beta	ΦΒ	1912	Creative and performing arts	National (US)	Fraternity, gender inclusive	Active	
Phi Iota Phi	ΦΙΦ	2009	Dance, African American	Local	Fraternity	Active	
Phi Mu Gamma	ΦΜΓ	1921	Drama and oratory	National (US)	Sorority	Inactive	
Phi Psi	ΦΨ	1903	Textile arts and manufacturing engineering	National (US)	Fraternity, coed	Active	
Theta Sigma Phi	ΘΣΦ	1909–1996	Journalism and communication	National (US)	Fraternity, women	Inactive	
Theta Sigma Upsilon	ΘΣΥ	1979	Arts, African American		Sorority	Inactive	
Zeta Phi Eta	ΖΦΗ	1893	Communication arts and sciences	National (US)	Fraternity, coed	Active	

=== Agriculture ===
Name	Symbols	Charter date and range	Emphasis	Scope	Type	Status	Ref.
Alpha Gamma Rho	ΑΓΡ	1904	Agriculture	International (US)	Fraternity	Active	
Alpha Gamma Sigma	ΑΓΣ	1923	Agriculture	National (US)	Fraternity	Active	
Alpha Tau Alpha	ΑΤΑ	1921	Agriculture and extension education	National (US)	Fraternity	Active	
Alpha Zeta	ΑΖ	1897	Agriculture and natural resources	National (US)	Fraternity, coed	Active	
Delta Theta Sigma	ΔΘΣ	1906	Agriculture	National (US)	Fraternity	Active	
Sigma Alpha	ΣΑ	1978	Agriculture	National (US)	Sorority	Active	

=== Business and economics ===
Name	Symbols	Charter date and range	Emphasis	Scope	Type	Status	Ref.
Alpha Kappa Psi	ΑΚΨ	1904	Business	International	Fraternity, coed	Active	
Alpha Iota	ΑΙ	1905	Business	National (US)	Sorority	Active	
Beta Pi Sigma	ΒΠΣ	February 1945	Business, African American	Regional (California)	Sorority	Active	
Delta Sigma Pi	ΔΣΠ	1907	Business	National (US)	Fraternity, coed	Active	
Epsilon Nu Tau	ΕΝΤ	2008	Entrepreneurship	National (US)	Fraternity, coed	Active	
Eta Phi Beta	ΗΦΒ	October 1942	Business, African American	National (US)	Sorority	Active	
Eta Rho Sigma	ΗΡΣ	2020	Business	National (US)	Sorority/Women	Active	
Kappa Eta Phi	ΚΗΦ	2011	Business, International Business	Local	Fraternity, coed	Active	
Gamma Iota Sigma	ΓΙΣ	1966	Insurance, risk management, actuarial sciences	International	Fraternity, coed	Active	
Iota Phi Lambda	ΙΦΛ	June 1, 1929	Business, African American	National (US)	Sorority	Active	
Lambda Kappa Mu	ΛΚΜ	January 19, 1937	Business, African American	National (US)	Sorority	Active	
Omicron Delta Epsilon	ΟΔΕ	1963	Economics honor society	International	Society, coed	Active	
Phi Chi Theta	ΦΧΘ	1924	Business	National (US)	Women's fraternity, coed	Active	
Phi Gamma Nu	ΦΓΝ	1924	Business	National (US)	Sorority, coed	Active	
Phi Theta Kappa	ΦΘΚ	1918–1924	Business administration, commerce, accounting	National (US)	Sorority	Inactive	
Pi Sigma Epsilon	ΠΣΕ	1952	Marketing and sales management	National (US)	Fraternity, coed	Active	
Sigma Iota Epsilon	ΣΙΕ	1927	Management honorary and professional society	International	Fraternity, coed	Active	

=== Education ===
Name	Symbols	Charter date and range	Emphasis	Scope	Type	Status	Ref.
Alpha Gamma Pi	ΑΓΠ	1963	Education, African American		Sorority	Inactive ?	
Delta Kappa Gamma	ΔΚΓ	1929	Education	International	Society, female	Active	
Kappa Delta Epsilon	ΚΔΕ	1933	Education	Nationa	Society, coed	Active	
Kappa Delta Pi	ΚΔΠ	1911	Education honor society	International	Society, coed	Active	
Phi Delta Kappa	ΦΔΚ	1906	Education	International	Fraternity, coed	Active	
Phi Delta Kappa	ΦΔΚ	May 23, 1923	Education, African American	International	Sorority, coed	Active	
Phi Delta Pi	ΦΔΠ	1916	Physical education, health sciences, and recreation	National (US)	Sorority	Inactive	
Phi Epsilon Kappa	ΦΕΚ	1913	Physical education, performance, sports management	National (US)	Fraternity, coed	Active	

=== Law ===
Name	Symbols	Charter date and range	Emphasis	Scope	Type	Status	Ref.
Delta Theta Phi	ΔΘΦ	1900	Law	International	Fraternity, coed	Active	
Epsilon Sigma Iota	ΕΣΙ	November 4, 1920	Law, African American	Local (Howard University School of Law)	Sorority	Active	
Gamma Eta Gamma	ΓΗΓ	1901	Law	National (US)	Fraternity, coed	Active	
Kappa Alpha Pi	ΚΑΠ	2007	Law	National (US)	Fraternity, coed	Active	
Lincoln's Inn Society		1907	Law	Local, Harvard Law School	Social club, coed	Inactive	
Phi Alpha Delta	ΦΑΔ	1902	Law	International	Fraternity, coed	Active	
Phi Delta Delta	ΦΔΔ	1911–1972	Law	National (US)	Sorority	Inactive	(Note: Merged with Phi Alpha Delta in 1972.)
Phi Delta Phi	ΦΔΦ	1869	Law honor (formerly professional)	International	Fraternity, coed	Active	(Note: Formed as a professional society but became an honor society in 2012.)
Pi Lambda Sigma	ΠΛΣ	2016	Pre-law, Government	Local, Cornell University	Society, coed	Active	
Sigma Alpha Nu	ΣΑΝ	2005	Pre-law	Local, University of California, Berkeley	Fraternity, coed	Active	
Sigma Delta Tau	ΣΔΤ	November 17, 1934	Law, African American	National	Fraternity	Active	
Tau Delta Sigma	ΤΔΣ	January 1914 – before 1934	Law, African American	Local, Howard University	Fraternity	Inactive	

=== Medicine ===
Name	Symbols	Charter date and range	Emphasis	Scope	Type	Status	Ref.
Aleph Yodh He	איה	1908–1921	Medicine, Jewish	National (US)	Fraternity	Inactive	
Alpha Delta Theta	ΑΔΘ	1944	Medical technology	Local, was national	Sorority	Active	
Alpha Delta Upsilon	ΑΔΥ		Chiropractic		Sorority	Active	
Alpha Epsilon Iota	ΑΕΙ	1890–1979	Medical	National (US)	Women's fraternity	Inactive	
Alpha Gamma Kappa	ΑΓΚ	1939	Podiatry	National (US)	Fraternity, coed	Active	
Alpha Kappa Kappa	ΑΚΚ	1888–20xx ?	Medicine	International, then local	Fraternity	Inactive	
Alpha Omega	ΑΩ	1907	Dentistry, Jewish	International	Fraternity, coed	Active	
Alpha Iota Gamma	ΑΙΓ	2008	Healthcare	National (US)	Fraternity, coed	Active	
Alpha Psi	ΑΨ	1907	Veterinary medicine	National (US)	Fraternity, coed	Active	
Alpha Tau Delta	ΑΤΔ	1921	Nursing	National (US)	Fraternity, coed	Active	
Alpha Tau Sigma	ΑΤΣ	1912–1964	Medical	Local, American School of Osteopathy	Fraternity	Inactive	
Alpha Zeta Gamma	ΑΖΓ	1910–1932	Dentistry	National (US)	Fraternity	Inactive	
Beta Chi	ΒΧ	1883–1884	Medical	Local, Yale University	Fraternity	Inactive	
Chi Delta Mu	ΧΔΜ	January 30, 1913	Dentistry, Pharmacy, Medicine, Podiatristry, Optometry, Osteopathy, Veterinary; African American	International	Fraternity, coed	Active	
Chi Eta Phi	ΧΗΦ	October 16, 1932	Nursing, African American	International	Sorority	Active	
Chi Rho Sigma	ΧΡΣ	1949, 1975	Chiropractic	International	Fraternity, coed	Active	
Chi Zeta Chi	ΧΖΧ	1901–1929	Medicine	National (US)	Fraternity	Inactive	
Cusp and Crown		December 9, 1921	Dentistry, African American	Local	Fraternity		
Delta Epsilon Mu	ΔΕΜ	1996	Pre-health, health-related fields	National (US)	Fraternity, coed	Active	
Delta Mu Chi	ΔΜΧ	September 22, 2014	Dental, Medical, and Pharmacy; African American	Local (Howard University)	Fraternity	Active	
Delta Omicron Alpha	ΔΟΑ	1907–1917	Medicine	National (US)	Fraternity	Inactive	
Delta Phi Sigma	ΔΦΣ	June 28, 1991	Medicine and dentistry	Local, Howard University College of Dentistry	Sorority	Active	
Delta Sigma Chi	ΔΣΧ	1913	Chiropractic	International	Fraternity	Active	
Delta Sigma Delta	ΔΣΔ	1882	Dentistry	International	Fraternity	Active	
Epsilon Psi Epsilon	ΕΨΕ	1911	Optometry	Local, formerly national	Fraternity	Active	
Epsilon Tau	ΕΤ	1898–19xx ?	Homeopathy	National (US)	Sorority	Inactive	
Hygeia Medical Sorority	HMS	2009	Medicine	Local, Universidad Mayor de San Simón	Sorority	Active	
Kappa Beta Phi	ΚΒΦ	1924	Medicine	Local, Jefferson Medical College	Fraternity	active	
Kappa Gamma Delta	ΚΓΔ	1994	Pre-medical	Regional, California	Sorority	Active	
Kappa Psi Psi	ΚΦΦ	2006	Healthcare, African American	Local	Sorority	Active	
Kappa Tau Epsilon	ΚΤΕ		Podiatry	Local, Kent State	Fraternity, coed	Active	
Lambda Pi Alpha	ΛΠΑ	1930	Nursing, African American	Local, previously national	Sorority	Active	
Mu Epsilon Delta	ΜΕΔ	1965	Health	National (US)	Fraternity, coed	Active	
Nu Sigma Nu	ΝΣΝ	1882	Medicine	International	Fraternity, coed	Active	
Omega Delta	ΩΔ	1919	Optometry	National	Fraternity	Active	
Omega Tau Sigma	ΩΤΣ	1906	Veterinary medicine	International	Fraternity, coed	Active	
Omega Upsilon Phi	ΩΥΦ	1894–1934	Medicine	International	Fraternity	Inactive, Merged	(Note: Defunct after Phi Beta Pi 1934 merger; Alpha chapter joined Phi Chi)
Phi Alpha Gamma	ΦΑΓ	1894–1948	Osteopathic medicine	National (US)	Fraternity	Inactive, Merged	(Note: Merged with Phi Chi in 1948)
Phi Alpha Sigma	ΦΑΣ	1888	Medicine	National	Fraternity	Active	
Phi Beta Pi	ΦΒΠ	1891	Medicine	Local, formerly National	Fraternity	Active	
Phi Chi	ΦΧ	1889	Medicine	International	Fraternity	Active	
Phi Delta	ΦΔ	1901–1918	Medicine	International	Fraternity	Inactive	
Phi Delta Epsilon	ΦΔΕ	1904	Medicine	International	Fraternity, coed	Active	
Phi Kappa Mu	ΦΚΜ	1933	Medicine	Local, University of the Philippines College of Medicine	Fraternity	Active	
Phi Lambda Kappa	ΦΛΚ	1907	Medicine	International	Fraternity	Active	
Phi Rho Sigma	ΦΡΣ	1890	Medicine	National (US)	Fraternity, coed	Active	
Phi Sigma Gamma	ΦΣΓ	1890	Osteopathic	National (US)	Fraternity	Active	
Psi Omega	ΨΩ	1892	Dentistry	National (US)	Fraternity	Active	
Rho Psi Eta	ΡΨΗ	2007	Pre-Health Careers	National (US)	Sorority	Active	
Rho Psi Phi	ΡΨΦ	1922	Medical, Dentistry, and Pharmacy; African American	National (US)	Sorority	Inactive	
Sigma Mu Delta	ΣΜΔ	1994	Pre-medical	Regional (California)	Fraternity	Active	
Sigma Phi Chi	ΣΦΧ	1911	Chiropractic	Local, Palmer College of Chiropractic	Sorority	Active	
Theta Kappa Psi	ΘΚΨ	1879	Medicine	Local (previously International)	Fraternity	Active	
Xi Psi Phi	ΞΨΦ	1889	Dentistry	International	Fraternity, coed	Active	
Zeta Phi	ΖΦ	1900	Medicine	National (US)	Sorority	Inactive	

=== Military, government, and foreign service ===
Name	Symbols	Charter date and range	Emphasis	Scope	Type	Status	Ref.
Alpha Gamma Xi	ΑΓΞ	January 1, 2014	Military, African American	National (US)	Sorority	Active	
Alpha Lambda Psi	ΑΛΨ	April 6, 2018 – 2018; June 30, 2020	Military, African American	National (US)	Fraternity	Active	
Alpha Omega Phi	ΓΩΦ	March 10, 2017	Military, African American	Local	Fraternity and sorority	Active	
Coed Affiliates Pershing Rifles		1966–1980s	Military	National (US)	Sorority	Inactive	
Delta Omicron Alpha	ΔΟΑ	May 15, 2016	Military, African American	Local	Sorority	Active	
Delta Phi Epsilon	ΔΦΕ	1920	Foreign Service	National (US)	Fraternity	Active	
Delta Phi Epsilon	ΔΦΕ	1972	Foreign Service	National (US)	Sorority	Active	
Iota Gamma Psi	ΙΓΩ	2017	Military and Federal Government, African American		Sorority	Active	
Kappa Epsilon Psi	ΚΕΨ	2011	Military, African American	National (US)	Sorority	Active	
Kappa Lambda Chi	ΚΛΧ	2013	Military	National (US)	Fraternity	Active	
Lambda Beta Alpha	ΛΒΑ	2017	Military, African American	National (US)	Sorority	Active	
Mu Beta Phi	ΜΒΦ	2017	Military	International	Fraternity	Active	
Mu Phi Psi	ΜΦΨ	June 17, 2017	Military, African American	National (US)	Fraternity and sorority	Inactive	
Omega Xi Omega	ΩΞΩ	January 18, 2018	Military, African American	National (US)	Fraternity, coed	Active	
Pershing Angels		1965	Military Drill	National (US)	Sorority	Active	
Pershing Rifles		1894	Military Drill	National (US)	Fraternity	Active	
Phi Delta Pi	ΦΔΠ	2020	Veterans, African American	National (US)	Fraternity	Active	(Note: Was previously called Pi Delta Phi Veterans Fraternity.)
Phi Gamma Phi	ΦΓΦ	July 23, 2020	Military, African American	Local	Fraternity	Active	
Pi Mu Phi	ΠΜΦ	2020	Military, African American		Sorority	Active	
Psi Delta Tau	ΨΔΤ	February 13, 2017	Military, African American	National (US)	Fraternity	Active	
Psi Rho Phi	ΩΡΦ	April 3, 2019	Military, African American		Fraternity	Active	
Rho Upsilon Tau	ΡΥΤ	June 11, 2016	Military, African American	Local	Sorority	Active	
Scabbard and Blade	S&B	1904	Military honor	National (US)	Society, coed	Active	
Sigma Alpha Gamma	ΣΑΓ	December 31, 2015	Military, African American	National (US)	Fraternity	Active	
Sigma Phi Psi	ΣΦΨ	February 2000	Military, African American	National (US)	Sorority	Active	
Theta Nu Psi	ΘΝΨ	December 6, 2016	Military, African American	Local	Fraternity	Active	
Xi Gamma Phi	ΞΓΦ	2021	Military, African American	Local	Sorority	Active	

=== Music ===
Name	Symbols	Charter date and range	Emphasis	Scope	Type	Status	Ref.
Delta Omicron	ΔΟ	1909	Music	International	Fraternity, coed	Active	
Kappa Kappa Psi	ΚΚΨ	1919	Band	National (US)	Fraternity, coed	Active	
Mu Beta Psi	ΜΒΨ	1925	Music	National (US)	Fraternity, coed	Active	
Mu Phi Epsilon	ΜΦΕ	1903	Music	International	Fraternity, coed	Active	(Note: Chartered as National Music sorority; changed status to Honor Society in 1935. Changed to Professional Music Sorority in 1944. Became a co-ed Professional Music Fraternity in 1977.)
Nu Kappa Epsilon	ΝΚΕ	1994	Music appreciation	National (US)	Sorority	Active	
Phi Boota roota	Φᗺr	1976	Percussion	National (US)	Fraternity, coed	Active	
Phi Mu Alpha Sinfonia	ΦΜΑ	1898	Music, social	National (US)	Fraternity	Active	(Note: Originally a men's music social fraternity, but was co-ed from 1976 to 1983. Returned to all-male since 1985.)
Phi Mu Epsilon	ΦΜΕ	1892–1906	Music, social	National (US)	Sorority	Inactive	
Sigma Alpha Iota	ΣΑΙ	1903	Music	National (US)	Women's fraternity	Active	
Tau Beta Sigma	ΤΒΣ	1946	Band, service	National (US)	Sorority, coed	Active	
Tau Rho Beta	ΤΡΒ	December 18, 2002	HBCU Bands and Choirs, African American	National (US)	Fraternity, coed	Active	

=== Pharmaceutical and pharmacological ===
Name	Symbols	Charter date and range	Emphasis	Scope	Type	Status	Ref.
Alpha Zeta Omega	ΑΖΩ	1919	Pharmacy	National (US)	Fraternity, coed	Active	
Beta Phi Sigma	ΒΦΣ	1888–1973	Pharmacy	National (US)	Fraternity	Inactive	
Delta Sigma Theta	ΔΣΘ	1914	Pharmacy, medical, and dentistry	International	Fraternity	Inactive	
Kappa Epsilon	ΚΕ	1921	Pharmacy	National (US)	Women's fraternity, coed	Active	
Kappa Psi	ΚΨ	1879	Pharmacy	National (US)	Fraternity, coed	Active	
Lambda Kappa Sigma	ΛΚΣ	1913	Pharmacy	National (US)	Women's fraternity, coed	Active	
Phi Delta Chi	ΦΔΧ	1883	Pharmacy	National (US)	Fraternity, coed	Active	
Rho Chi	ΡΧ	1922	Pharmacy honor society	National (US)	Society, coed	Active	
Rho Pi Phi	ΡΠΦ	1919	Pharmacy	National (US)	Fraternity, coed	Active	

=== Science, technology, engineering, and math ===
Name	Symbols	Charter date and range	Emphasis	Scope	Type	Status	Ref.
Alpha Chi Sigma	ΑΧΣ	1902	Chemistry	National (US)	Fraternity, coed	Active	
Alpha Omega Epsilon	ΑΩΕ	1983	Engineering	National (US)	Sorority	Active	
Alpha Rho Chi	ΑΡΧ	1914	Architecture	National (US)	Fraternity, coed	Active	
Alpha Sigma Kappa	ΑΣΚ	1989	Architecture, engineering, mathematics, and sciences	National (US)	Sorority	Active	
Beta Psi Omega	ΒΨΩ	2010	Biology	National (US)	Fraternity, coed	Active	
Epsilon Gamma Iota	ΕΓΙ	1984	Engineering, computer science, and architecture; African American	Local	Fraternity	Active	
Eta Kappa Tau	ΗΚΤ	March 2000	Engineering and technology, African American		Fraternity	Active	
Kappa Eta Kappa	ΚΗΚ	1923	Electrical and computer engineering	National (US)	Fraternity, coed	Active	
Kappa Theta Pi	ΚΘΠ	2012	Information technology	National (US)	Fraternity, coed	Active	
Pi Mu Epsilon	ΠΜΕ	1914	Mathematics honor society	National (US)	Society, coed	Active	
Phi Sigma Rho	ΦΣΡ	1984	Science, technology, engineering, mathematics	National (US)	Sorority and non-binary	Active	
Pi Delta Nu	ΠΔΝ	1921–1950s	Chemistry	National (US)	Sorority	Inactive	
Scarab		1909–19xx ?	Architecture, landscape architecture, architectural engineering	National (US)	Fraternity	Inactive, Merged	
Sigma Phi Delta	ΣΦΔ	1924	Engineering	International	Fraternity	Active	
Tau Omega	ΤΩ	1927	Aeronautical engineering	National (US)	Fraternity	Inactive, Merged	
Theta Tau	ΘΤ	1904	Engineering	International	Fraternity, coed or male by chapter	Active	
Triangle Fraternity		1907	Engineering, architecture, and sciences	National (US)	Fraternity	Active	

=== Other ===
Name	Symbols	Charter date and range	Emphasis	Scope	Type	Status	Ref.
Alpha Chi Pi Omega	ΑΧΠΩ	October 27, 1945	Cosmetology, African American	National (US)	Fraternity and sorority	Active	
Alpha Epsilon Zeta	ΑΕΖ	2003	Multidisciplinary	Local	Fraternity	Active	
Alpha Eta Rho	ΑΗΡ	1929	Aviation	International	Fraternity, coed	Active	
American Criminal Justice Association–Lambda Alpha Epsilon	ΛΑΕ	1937	Criminal Justice	International	Fraternity, coed	Active	
Concatenated Order of Hoo-Hoo		1892	Forestry	International	Fraternal order; coed	Active	
Delta Omega Epsilon	ΔΩΕ	1985	Civics, Academics	Local, NY Tri-state Area	Fraternity	Active	(Note: Formed as a local coed organization with an emphasis on civics. However, after going inactive in 1991, it was reestablished as a traditional social fraternity.)
Epsilon Eta	ΕΗ	2006	Environmental, Sustainability	National (US)	Fraternity, coed	Active	
Epsilon Nu Delta	ΕΝΔ	1942	Mortuary, African American	National (US)	Fraternity, coed	Active	
Pi Sigma Eta	ΠΣΗ	1930	Mortician honorary, funeral service	National (US)	Fraternity, coed	Active	
Sigma Alpha Sigma Mu	ΣΑΣΜ	2012	Sports management	Local, Ohio University	Fraternity, coed	Active	
Sigma Phi Sigma	ΣΦΣ		funeral service	National (US)	Fraternity, coed	Active	
Sigma Psi Mu	ΣΨΜ		Sports management and entertainment management	Local, University of South Carolina	Fraternity, coed	Active	
Sigma Rho	ΣΡ	1892	Mining	Local, Michigan Technological University	Fraternity	Active	

== See also ==
- College fraternities and sororities
- Honor society
