= Lambda Beta Alpha =

American military sorority

- ΛΒΑ
- Founded: November 10, 2017; 8 years ago Manassas, Virginia
- Type: Professional
- Affiliation: Military Women's Coalition
- Status: Active
- Emphasis: Military
- Scope: National
- Motto: "United in Service, Bound by Love"; Scripture: Psalms 46:5
- Colors: Shimmering Silver and Metallic Gold
- Flower: White Orchid
- Jewel: Citrine
- Mascot: Snow Leopard
- Publication: The Dynasty Report
- Chapters: 3
- Nicknames: Ladies Bonded in Arms, Lovely Lambda Ladies, Lambda Ladies
- Headquarters: 14497 Potomac Mills Road; Woodbridge, Virginia 22192; United States
- Website: www.lambdabetaalpha.org

Lambda Beta Alpha Military Sorority, Inc (ΛΒΑ) is a military sorority. It was established in 2017 in Virginia by women who served in the United States Military.

== History ==
Lambda Beta Alpha Sorority, Inc. was founded on November 10, 2017, in Virginia by ten women who served in the United States Military. It was incorporated on December 4, 2017. Its mission is to foster sisterhood among a consummate group of exclusively chosen women from all branches of the United States Armed Forces; provide philanthropic and charitable services; study and promote awareness of women veteran issues; and share resources with young ladies entering the military as well as providing outreach and support to our sisters-in-arms who are separating or retiring from the military.

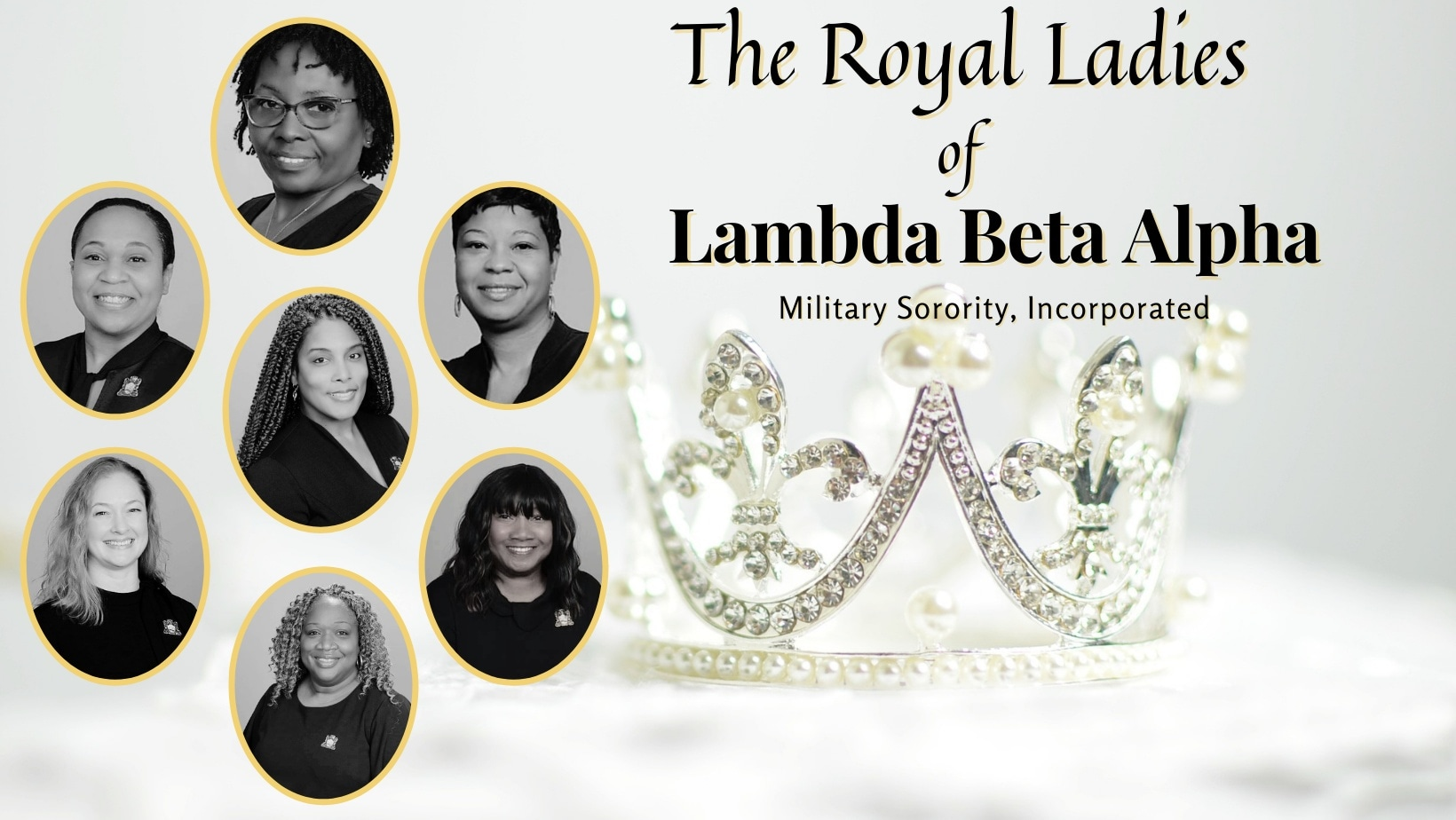
Seven founding members

The Lambda Beta Alpha founders, known as the "Original X", are:

- Tina Baker, United States Navy
- Melissa Barnes, United States Air Force
- Tarama Giles, United States Air Force
- Susan Griffin, United States Air Force and United States Army
- Shenece Harris, United States Army
- Tracey Hayward-Ferguson, United States Army
- Deborah Ivey, United States Army
- Lisa Kirsch, United States Air Force
- Dana Thomas, United States Army

Giles served as the first national president. The organization changed its name to Lambda Beta Alpha Military Sorority, Inc. in 2018 to ensure its name reflected the nature of its membership.

The Lambda Beta Alpha national headquarters is located in Woodbridge, Virginia.

== Symbols and traditions ==
The sorority's colors are shimmering silver and metallic gold. Its jewel is citrine and its flower is the orchid. Its mascot is the snow leopard. Its scripture is Psalms 46:5, "God is within her, she will not fall; God will help her at break of day."

During the membership intake period, candidates are referred to as Ladies-in-Waiting. The terms soror (Latin for sister) and Lady are used among members when referring to and addressing each other.

The sorority's publication is The Dynasty Report.

ΛΒΑ member helping with Wreaths Across America

== Activities ==
Lambda Beta Alpha participates in Wreaths Across America, with its members volunteering to lay wreaths on graves of former service members. has partnerships with Snow Leopard Trust, the Military Child Education Coalition, Psych Hub, and the Women Veterans Alliance.

=== Recognition ===
- Nancy McFarlane, Mayor of the City of Raleigh, North Carolina proclaimed May 25, 2019 as Honor Our Female Veterans Day, with the coordination of Lambda Beta Alpha.
- United States Senator and member of the United States Senate Committee on Armed Services, Tammy Duckworth, issued a letter recognizing Mary 25th as "Honor Our Female Veterans Day".
- Governor of Maryland, Larry Hogan, issued a Governor's Citation to Lambda Beta Alpha for Founders' Day for "demonstration of high integrity and ability, meriting our great trust and respect"
- Lambda Beta Alpha received congratulations for the establishment of the sorority, celebration of their Founders' Day, and recognition for their work in the community from the Governor of Texas Greg Abbott, Governor of Virginia Ralph Northam, Congressman Gerry Connolly, Senators Mark Warner and Tim Kaine, and Mayor of Suffolk, Virginia Linda Johnson

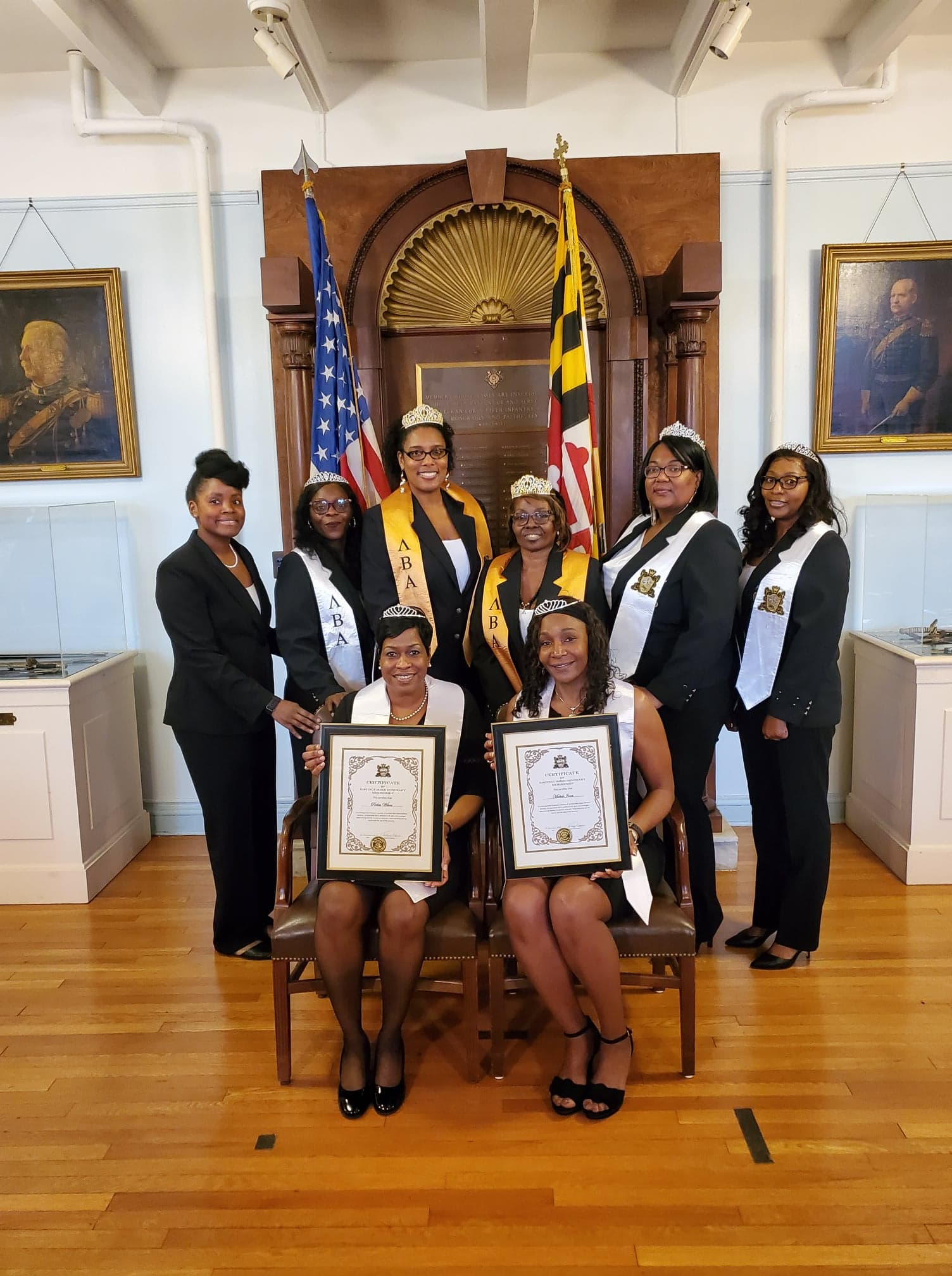
Honorary members, December 2019

== Membership ==
Lambda Beta Alpha general membership consists of active duty, retired, and honorably discharged service women from each branch of the United States Armed Forces — United States Air Force, United States Army, United States Marine Corps, and United States Navy, as well the National Guard, and Reserves.

Honorary Membership is bestowed upon honorably discharged or retired women veterans who are over the age of 65 and have been nominated for membership. Distinguished Honorary Membership is Lambda Beta Alpha's highest honor.

== Affiliation ==
The Military Women's Coalition is a national group of formal and information organizations that work collaboratively to serve and support US active duty, reserve, Guard, Veteran, and retired service women by uniting and elevating their voices to influence policy and improve their well-being. Lambda Beta Alpha joined the Coalition in its infancy and is currently the only military Greek-letter organization involved.

On August 1, 2018, the Lambda Beta Alpha national officers, under the guidance of Giles, founded the Orchids of Lambda, the first auxiliary organization within the military Greek-letter community. The Orchids are female military relatives (i.e. spouse, mother, sister, daughter, aunt, cousin), supporters (significant other, friend, etc...), ROTC cadets, and those desiring to enter the military who are age eighteen and older. The Lambda Snow Cubs, the sorority's youth auxiliary for young girls ages five to seventeen was introduced during Lambda Beta Alpha's 2021 National Convention.

== Chapters ==
Following is a list of Lambda Beta Alpha chapters. Active chapters are indicated in bold. Inactive chapters are in italics.

Chapter	Charter date	Location	Status	Ref.
**Alpha**		Delaware, New Jersey, New York, and Pennsylvania· ·	Active	
Beta			Inactive	
**Gamma**		Louisiana	Active	
**Delta**		Maryland and Washington, D.C.	Active	

== Notable members ==
- Michele S. Jones (Distinguished Honorary, 2019), retired Command Sergeant Major of the U.S. Army Reserves

== See also ==
- Professional fraternities and sororities
- Service fraternities and sororities
