= Alpha Tau Sigma =

Professional medical fraternity that ceased operations in 1964

- ΑΤΣ
- Founded: 1912; 114 years ago American School of Osteopathy
- Type: Professional
- Affiliation: Independent
- Status: Defunct
- Defunct date: 1964
- Emphasis: Medicine
- Scope: Local
- Motto: Mense Et Manu
- Publication: The Pyramid
- Chapters: 1
- Headquarters: Kirksville, Missouri; United States

Alpha Tau Sigma (ΑΤΣ) was a professional medical fraternity at the American School of Osteopathy in Kirksville, Missouri in the United States. It was established in 1912 and ceased operations in 1964.

== History ==
Alpha Tau Sigma Fraternity was a professional medical fraternity founded in 1912 at the American School of Osteopathy, now the private A.T. Still University, in Kirksville, Missouri. Its founders were Charles W. Barnes, W. S. Giddings, E. E. Loose, E. E. Ruby, and W. C. Warner

In April 1913, the fraternity rented rooms from the Axis Club in the Heinzeman-Swigert building in Kirksville. By February 1914, it had relocated to the Foster building and moved to the Bondurant building in the fall of 1914. For several years, the fraternity occupied a three-story nineteen room house at 701 West Jefferson Street. The house was sold in 1942.

The fraternity was incorporated in 1915, with the intention and members were empowered to expand to other recognized osteopathy colleges. Although the chapter remained successful on its founding campus, it never grew beyond a local entity. However, the grand chapter of Alpha Tau Sigma fraternity was associated with the American Osteopathic Society by 1944.

Alpha Tau Sigma ceased operations in 1964. An archived member lists note at least 45 members among one member's network, scattered in the states of Missouri, Oklahoma, and Kansas, with a few elsewhere.

== Symbols ==
The fraternity's motto was Mense Et Mansu. Its publication was The Pyramid.

== Activities ==
Alpha Tau Sigma hosted medical lectures, musical performances, and social events. Its members also participated in Interfraternity Council baseball, basketball, football, softball, and volleyball tournaments. Some of its members formed the Alpha Tau Sigma Orchestra.

== See also ==
- Professional fraternities and sororities
