= Alpha Gamma Rho =

American collegiate agricultural fraternity

- ΑΓΡ
- Founded: October 10, 1904; 121 years ago Ohio State University
- Type: Social
- Affiliation: NIC
- Status: Active
- Emphasis: Professional - Agriculture
- Scope: National (US)
- Motto: "To Make Better Men"
- Pillars: Recruitment, Commitment, Education, and Recognition
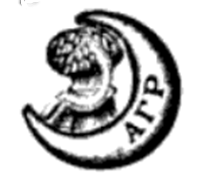
- Member badge
- Colors: Dark Green and Gold
- Symbol: Sickle and Sheaf
- Flower: Pink Rose
- Chapters: 71
- Headquarters: 1333 NW Vivion Road, Suite 110; Kansas City, Missouri 64118; United States
- Website: www.alphagammarho.org

Alpha Gamma Rho (ΑΓΡ; commonly known as AGR, The Rho, or Ag Rho) is an American social and professional agriculture-focused fraternity. It was established at Ohio State University in 1904.

== History ==
Alpha Gamma Rho considers the Morrill Act of 1862 to be the instrument of its inception. Having been signed by President Abraham Lincoln in 1862, it provided land and other financial support to establish one institution of higher learning in the agricultural and mechanical sciences within each state. Alpha Gamma Rho, referred to as "AGR", was founded when two local fraternities from Ohio State University (Alpha Gamma Rho, founded on October 10, 1904) and the University of Illinois (Delta Rho Sigma, founded in 1906) met at an International Livestock Competition in Chicago.

Sixteen men signed the fraternity's charter at the Claypool Hotel in Indianapolis on April 4, 1908. Expansion increased dramatically over the next three decades to almost all land-grant universities in the country. The first chapter at a non-land-grant university was chartered in 1958 at Arizona State University. The first non-state (private) associated chapter (Beta Psi) was at Delaware Valley University in Doylestown, Pennsylvania.

== Symbols ==
The four pillars of Alpha Gamma Rho are recruitment, commitment, education, and recognition. Its colors are dark green and gold. Its symbols are the sickle and the sheaf. Its flower is the pink rose. The fraternity's motto is "To Make Better Men".

== Chapters ==
As of 2024, the fraternity has 71 chapters.

== Local chapter or member misconduct ==
In 2018, the chapter at University of Minnesota was suspended after one of its members, Dylan Fulton, was found dead following a night of drinking. After an investigation, it was determined Fulton had died of alcohol poisoning.

In 2023, the chapter at Clemson University was placed on a four-year suspension for hazing after a pledge was burned on his back with salt-like material.

== See also ==
- List of social fraternities and sororities
- Professional fraternities and sororities
