= Epsilon Eta =

American environmental fraternity

- ΕΗ
- Founded: 2006; 20 years ago University of North Carolina at Chapel Hill
- Type: Professional
- Affiliation: Independent
- Status: Active
- Emphasis: Environment and sustainability
- Scope: National
- Pillars: Volunteerism, Sustainability, Professional Development, Social, and Diversity, Equality, and Inclusion
- Colors: Kelly green, Navy blue and Sky blue
- Tree: Oak
- Chapters: 22 active
- Nicknames: Ep Eta, Eta (University of Michigan)
- Headquarters: United States

Epsilon Eta (ΕΗ), also known as Ep Eta (or Eta at the University of Michigan), is an American professional gender-inclusive fraternity for students interested in careers in environmental science and sustainability. It was founded in 2006 at the University of North Carolina at Chapel Hill in Chapel Hill, North Carolina. It was the first national environmental fraternity in the United States and has grown to include chapters across the United States. There is no national organizational structure as of December 2024.

== History ==
Liza Schillo, an undergraduate student at the University of North Carolina at Chapel Hill, founded Epsilon Eta Environmental Honors Fraternity in 2006. It was established as a professional, gender-inclusive fraternity for individuals seeking post-graduate positions and careers in environmental science and sustainability. The fraternity's mission is "to promote a healthy and sustainable environment and connect students to industries, community service, and academia in pursuit of these goals."

Beta chapter at the University of Michigan was conceived by Julia Austin, Zach Fogel, Daly Kleaveland, and Julia Wang in the summer of 2014. They recruited Caitlin Climes, Sam McMullen, Josh Musicant, Dylan Nelson, and Matt Sehrsweeney to complete the group of nine founders. Beta chapter was chartered and initiated its first class in 2015. With this chapter, Epsilon Eta became first national environmental fraternity in the United States.

Originally meeting in a freshman environmental earth sciences seminar, nine sophomores formed an Epsilon Eta colony at the University of Pennsylvania in October 2015; the colony later became Gamma chapter. Other chapters followed in 2016 and 2017, with North Carolina State University becoming the seventh official chapter in 2017. The twelfth chapter was established at the University of Delaware in 2018. This was followed by chapters at the University of Illinois Urbana-Champaign and San Diego State University in 2018, and Boston University and University of Maryland, College Park in 2019.

By 2020, the Alpha chapter had initiated ninety members, and an executive committee was established to oversee the national fraternity. However, in the fall of 2020 three of Alpha chapter's former members publicly criticized the group "for fostering white supremacy." The fraternity's executive board and Alpha's members decided to close the chapter in September 2020. The Daily Tar Heel shared the chapter's statement: "As a historically exclusive and majority-white institution with semblances of Greek life, we have contributed to the preservation of white supremacy on UNC-Chapel Hill’s campus. Our actions have marginalized and silenced BIPOC voices. To address these injustices, we view abolition as the most direct course of action to dismantle white supremacy."

Despite this setback, new chapters formed at Virginia Commonwealth University in 2020, the University of Arizona in 2022, and the University of Virginia in 2023. The Alpha chapter was re-established at the University of North Carolina in September 2022 by Tayton Alvis, Sarah Masters, Zachary Miller, Gregory Mink, and Sanjana Venkatraman.

== Symbols ==
The Greek letters Epsilon Eta stand for science and morality. Epsilon Eta's colors are Kelly green, navy blue, and sky blue. Its original emblem is a sky-blue shield edged in navy blue and decorated with a white three-pronged geometric knot entwined around an oak tree. A later variation of the emblem features a light green shield with a dark green emblem of leaf veins on the right half and an overlaying tree in dark green across the center.

Epsilon Eta's pillars are volunteerism, sustainability, professional development, social, and diversity, equity, and inclusion.

== Membership ==
Membership to Epsilon Eta is not limited by major but initiates must be interested in the environmental field. The fraternity's members are divided into regular, associate, and alumni. Associate members are undergraduates who fail to meet the GPA or service hour requirements. Regular members and alumni may wear the fraternity's insignia.

== Chapters ==
Following are the chapters of Epsilon Eta, with active chapters indicated in bold and inactive chapters in italics.

Chapter	Charter date and range	Institution	Location	Status	Ref.
**Alpha**	2006 – September 2020; September 2022	University of North Carolina at Chapel Hill	Chapel Hill, North Carolina	Active	
**Beta**	2015	University of Michigan	Ann Arbor, Michigan	Active	
**Gamma**	October 2015	University of Pennsylvania	Philadelphia, Pennsylvania	Active	(Note: Chapter colonized in October 2015.)
**Delta**	January 27, 2017	Longwood University	Farmville, Virginia	Active	(Note: Both the Longwood University and the University of Pittsburgh chapters call themselves the Delta chapter in their constitution/bylaws.)
Epsilon	2016	University of Oregon	Eugene, Oregon	Inactive?	
**Delta**	2017	University of Pittsburgh	Pittsburgh, Pennsylvania	Active	
**Iota**	2017	North Carolina State University	Raleigh, North Carolina	Active	
**Kappa**	2017	Cornell University	Ithaca, New York	Active	
**Lambda**	2017	University of California, Berkeley	Berkeley, California	Active	
**Mu**	201x ?	Drake University	Des Moines, Iowa	Active	(Note: Both the Drake University and University of Delaware chapters refer to themselves as Mu chapter on their Instagram profile.)
**Mu**	2018	University of Delaware	Newark, Delaware	Active	
	2018	University of Illinois Urbana-Champaign	Urbana, Illinois	Active	
**Omicron**	2018	San Diego State University	San Diego, California	Active	
**Pi**	2018	Boston University	Boston, Massachusetts	Active	
**Sigma**	2019	Nova Southeastern University	Fort Lauderdale, Florida	Active	
**Sigma**	2023	Tulane University	New Orleans, Louisiana	Active	
**Upsilon**	2019	University of Maryland, College Park	College Park, Maryland	Active	
	2020	Virginia Commonwealth University	Richmond, Virginia	Active	
**Tau**	2022	University of Arizona	Tucson, Arizona	Active	
**Upsilon**	2023	University of Virginia	Charlottesville, Virginia	Active	
**Phi**	202x ?	University of North Carolina Wilmington	Wilmington, North Carolina	Active	
**Phi**	202x ?	Vanderbilt University	Nashville, Tennessee	Active	(Note: This is also known as the Phi chapter, according to its LinkedIn and Instagram pages.)
**Psi**	2025	Indiana University Bloomington	Bloomington, Indiana	Active	

== See also ==
- Professional fraternities and sororities
