= Alpha Iota =

American collegiate business sorority

- ΑΙ
- Coat of Arms of Alpha Iota
- Founded: October 21, 1925; 100 years ago American Institute of Business
- Type: Professional
- Affiliation: Independent
- Status: Active
- Emphasis: Business
- Scope: National
- Motto: "Study to Show Thyself Approved"
- Member badge
- Colors: White and Royal blue
- Symbol: Cup, Sphinx, Rose, Ionic Column, Two Stars, Open Book, and Roman fasces
- Flower: American Beauty Rose
- Publication: The Notebook
- Chapters: 1 active collegiate, 14 alumnae
- Members: 62,000+ lifetime
- Headquarters: 3219 SE 18th Court; Des Moines, Iowa 50320-1901; United States
- Website: www.alphaiota.org

Alpha Iota (ΑΙ) is a national collegiate professional sorority for women in the field of business. It was established in 1925 at the American Institute of Business in Des Moines, Iowa.

== History ==
Alpha Iota was founded on October 21, 1925, by Elsie M. Fenton at the American Institute of Business in Des Moines, Iowa. Fenton's goal was to promote friendship among the students of that school. The mission statement of Alpha Iota is:

The purpose of Alpha Iota is to make each member a better businesswoman through the development of self-confidence, leadership, and awareness of responsibility to herself and her community. A spirit of loyalty, friendship, participation, and education is fostered among all members.

On April 11, 1930, Alpha Iota was incorporated in the State of Iowa as a non-profit organization. The sorority established 28 chapters that same year. Its first national convention was held in 1930. Fenton served as the sorority's first national president. The first alumnae chapter of Alpha Iota was organized on May 28, 1930.

The sorority held its second national convention in Des Moines on November 18, 1931. One of Alpha Iota's early traditions was selecting a member who represented the "ideal secretary" at the convention. Later, the award winner was called the "Ideal Girl".

A review of the schools that hosted chapters shows that the initial focus of the sorority was secretarial or stenography schools, but was expanded during the Great Depression and World War II era with chapters at teachers' colleges and full universities. The sorority's focus shifted with the expansion of opportunities for women in business.

By 1932, it had over 4,000 members, growing to 8,000 by 1936. The society reached 10,000 members on June 19, 1937. In 1940, it had grown to 155 collegiate chapters and more than 45 alumnae chapters. A year later in May 1941, it had 96 active chapters, 65 alumnae chapters, and 18,000 initiated members.

After a period of quick growth, the sorority's membership dwindled in the postwar period. A significant driver of this trend was the closure of many early business schools as junior, technical, and four-year colleges displaced them. For its 50th anniversary conclave held in Washington, D.C. in 1975, there were 140 active chapters in the United States and Canada. It had initiated 62,000 members. At that conclave, Elsie Fenton-McGee stepped down as the organization's president, having served in this capacity since 1925. She was replaced by Laura Tallone. Fenton-McGee was given the title founder and grand president emeritus.

Today, the sorority is divided into five districts, composed mostly of alumnae chapters, with groups throughout the United States and Canada. It was recognized by the National Association of College and University Business Officers.

== Symbols ==
The sorority's badge is a square shield with an Elizabethan, three-lobed base and an eared, twice-engrailed top. At the sides and bottom, it has a wide gold border. The center is a field of black enamel, divided into three, two uppermost, with the Greek letters Α and Ι, italicized in gold, each standing alone in the two uppermost fields. The shield is plain or surmounted with seven seed pearls, six more of which mark the border between the three fields, and an emerald or a ruby at the center. The lower field bears a cup, in gold. The badge may carry a chapter guard. Alpha Iota also had a gold scholarship key or charm, presented annually to students with the highest grade point average.

The Alpha Iota coat-of-arms includes these symbols: a sphinx, a rose, the Ionic column, two stars, an open book, and a Roman fasces. At the bottom of the coat-of-arms are the words, Alpha Iota. The sorority's colors are white and royal blue. Its flower is the American Beauty Rose. Its open motto is "Study to Show Thyself Approved". Its quarterly publication is Notebook, first published in 1931.

In 1934, the sorority published the song, "The Sweetheart of Alpha Iota", written by Margaret D. O'Connor with music by Mary Alice Mullin. The Alpha Iota ritual includes each member placing a lit candle, symbolizing friendship, on an altar.

== Activities ==
Alpha Iota holds national and district conventions biannually. It presents a scholarship key, an award to the collegiate member with the highest scholastic average at each collegiate chapter. It also awards scholarships to collegiate members and to the daughters and granddaughters of members.

Heartspring (formerly known as the Institute of Logopedics) in Wichita, Kansas was adopted as the Alpha Iota international service project in 1949. It continues to be one of the sorority's philanthropy. In 1967, the sorority started Operation Green Thumb, a project to help children with disabilities explore nature and grow plants.

During World War II the sorority set a goal of raising $1 million in war bonds for the purchase of a B-29 Super Fortress bomber. They raised $1,227,161 ($22,443,824 in 2022 money) in November and December 1944, which paid for a $600,000 B-29, a $250,000 heavy bomber, and an additional $377,161 to help rehabilitate wounded servicemen. Beta Omicron chapter led this effort. The sorority and its alumnae chapters also donated 95 radios to Army, Navy, and veteran hospitals across the United States.

== Membership ==
Potential members were recruited based on superior scholarship, leadership, personality, and character. The sorority has two levels of membership—first and second degree. The first degree is earned by active collegiate members, while a second degree is given when a first-degree member transfers to an alumnae chapter.

== Governance ==
Alpha Iota is overseen by its board of governors. It was incorporated as a nonprofit organization.

== Chapters ==
Alpha Iota has chartered at least 155 chapters. It has collegiate and alumnae chapters, and previously had professional chapters. It currently has one active collegiate chapter and fourteen active alumnae chapters.

== See also ==
- Professional fraternities and sororities
