= Gamma Iota Sigma =

American college insurance fraternity

- ΓΙΣ
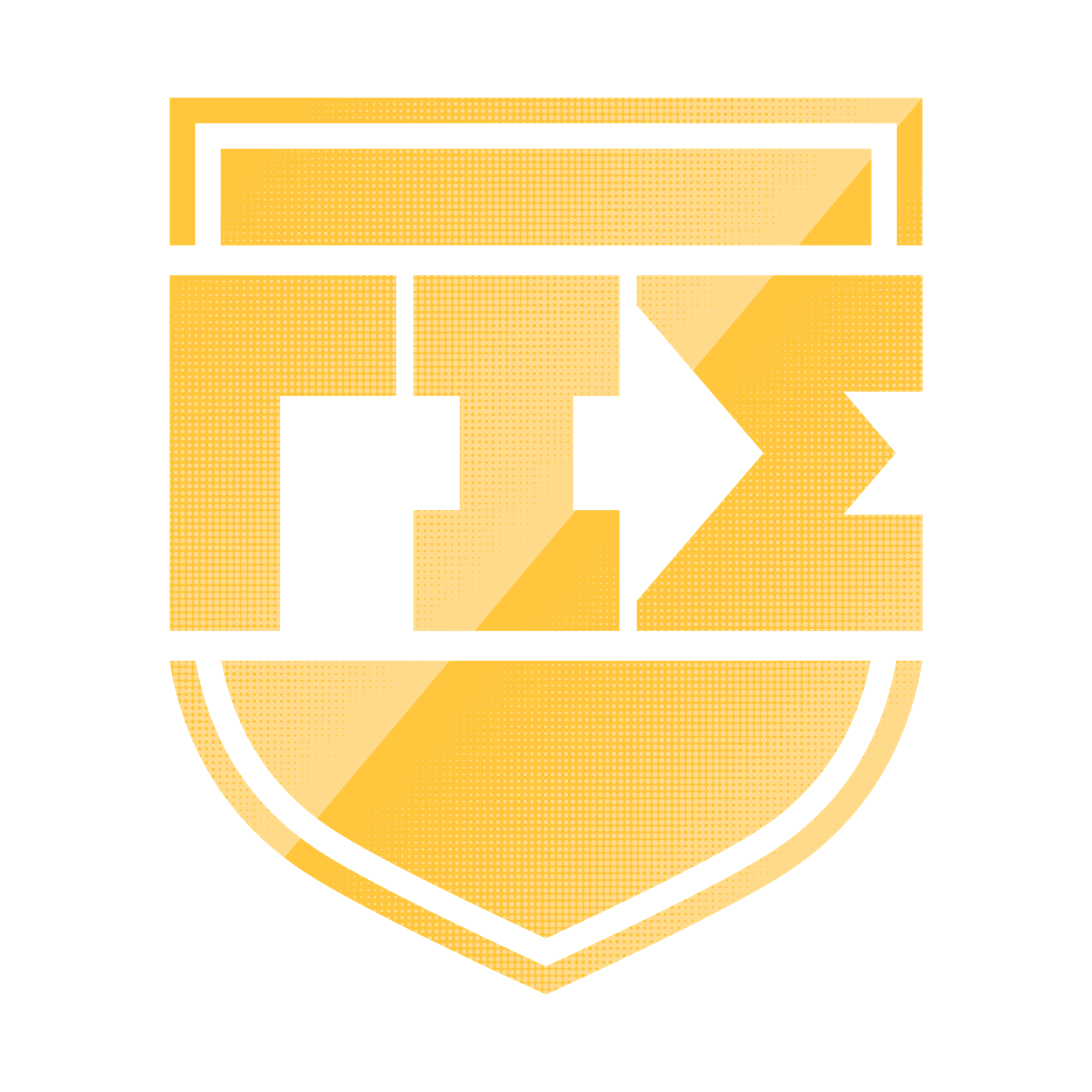
- Founded: April 16, 1966; 60 years ago Ohio State University
- Type: Professional
- Former affiliation: PFA
- Status: Active
- Emphasis: Insurance, risk management, and actuarial science
- Scope: National
- Colors: Black and Gold
- Symbol: Four Clasped Hands
- Publication: Industry News newsletter Student News newsletter
- Chapters: 100
- Members: 5,000 active
- Headquarters: P.O. Box 1744; Powell, Ohio 43065; United States
- Website: www.gammaiotasigma.org

Gamma Iota Sigma (ΓΙΣ) is a collegiate professional fraternity, founded on April 16, 1966 at Ohio State University in Columbus, Ohio. It is an international professional fraternity organized to promote, encourage and sustain student interest in insurance, risk management, and actuarial science as professions. The fraternity was designed to be "the insurance industry's premier collegiate talent pipeline."

== History ==
The idea of a national scholastic insurance fraternity started to become a reality when the Griffith Foundation for Insurance Education filed for incorporation in 1965. The following year, the OSU Insurance Society, which started at Ohio State University in the early 1960s, petitioned and was chartered as the first Gamma Iota Sigma chapter, thereafter called Alpha chapter. The fraternity's mission is "promoting and sustaining student interest in careers in insurance, risk management, and actuarial science."

A Grand Chapter or executive committee of Gamma Iota Sigma was formed from the original fraternity planning committee, appointed by the Griffith Foundation. The first Grand Chapter president was Warren L. Weeks, then a Griffith Foundation trustee. His commitment to the concept of a national student organization led to the eventual formation of Gamma Iota Sigma

The Beta chapter was chartered at Bowling Green State University in 1967. In 1969, the Gamma chapter was chartered at the University of Cincinnati. From this beginning, the fraternity spread across the United States. In October 2001, Gamma Iota Sigma became an international fraternity with the chartering of the Alpha Rho chapter at.Fanshawe College in London Ontario, Canada. However, the Alpha Rho chapter is now defunct.

The fraternity presents the Warren L. Weeks, Sr. Scholarship to a student member each year. Nominations for the award are made by local chapters.

== Symbols ==
Gamma Iota Sigma emblem is a shield in the shape of an inverted triangle. Inside a narrow border are Greek letters for Gamma Iota Sigma. Each of the three sides symbolizes three of four fraternal ideals.

Gamma Iota Sigma Coat of Arms is in the shape of what is known as a fire mark. Fire marks were made of iron and placed on the exterior of the buildings on insured properties to identify the specific fire company that, in the event of a fire, would serve to extinguish it. The fire mark is decorated with the symbol of the four clasped right hands. Each hand is representative of one of the four ideals upon which the fraternity is based: friendship, knowledge, integrity, and fidelity. Beneath clasped hands are the Greek letters for Gamma Iota Sigma.

== See also ==
- Professional fraternities and sororities
