= Sigma Phi Sigma (professional) =

Funeral service collegiate fraternity

- ΣΦΣ
- Founded: October 1965; 59 years ago Southern Illinois University Carbondale
- Type: Professional
- Affiliation: Independent
- Status: Active
- Emphasis: Mortuary science
- Scope: National
- Chapters: 18
- Headquarters: United States

Sigma Phi Sigma (ΣΦΣ) is an American professional and service coed fraternity for college students studying to be funeral service practitioners.

== History ==
Sigma Phi Sigma was formed in the fall of 1965 at Southern Illinois University Carbondale. Its mission is to promote continuing education, professionalism, and a sense of social responsibility amongst college students studying to be licensed funeral directors throughout the United States.

== Membership ==
Membership in Sigma Phi Sigma is limited to college students studying funeral services. The fraternity does not hold a rush for membership. It is coed. The fraternity admits chapters at four-year schools as well as community colleges that offer funerary service and mortuary science programs.

== Activities ==
The fraternity sponsors service projects such as cleaning headstones in local cemeteries. Its members have also supported charities by participating in food drives and blood drives; holding fundraisers such as bake sales, haunted houses, and golf tournaments; and volunteering. They also create educational displays for professional conventions. The Gamma chapter at the University of Central Oklahoma has a restored horse-drawn hearse that is used in the university's homecoming parade. Gamma also provides two scholarships to funeral service majors each year.

== Chapters ==
There are eighteen chapters of Sigma Phi Sigma. Active chapters are indicated in bold. Inactive chapters and institutions are in italics.

Chapter	Charter Date	University	Location	Status	Reference
**Alpha**	1965	Southern Illinois University Carbondale	Carbondate, Illinois	Active	
Beta ?	c. 1965-1966	Kentucky School of Mortuary Science	Louisville, Kentucky	Inactive	(Note: The chapter name and charter date are approximated from a 1966 graduate of the Kentucky School of Mortuary Science who was a member of Sigma Phi Sigma. The school closed in September 1980.)
**Gamma**	October 22, 1970	University of Central Oklahoma	Edmond, Oklahoma	Active	
Delta	19xx ?–19xx ?; 2014	John A. Gupton College	Nashville, Tennessee		
	Bef. 1970	Mt. Hood Community College	Gresham, Oregon	Active	
	Bef. 1979	Vincennes University	Vincennes, Indiana	Inactive	
	Bef. 1981	McNeese State University	Lake Charles, Louisiana	Inactive	
	Bef. 1988	Milwaukee Area Technical College	Milwaukee, Wisconsin		
	Bef. 1998	Simmons Institute of Funeral Service	Syracuse, New York	Inactive	(Note: The school closed in 2013.)
**Iota**	2019	Mercer County Community College	Mercer County, New Jersey	Active	
**Lambda**		Kansas City Kansas Community College	Kansas City, Kansas	Active	
**Mu**		East Mississippi Community College	Scooba, Mississippi	Active	
**Xi**		Jefferson State Community College	Birmingham, Alabama	Active	
**Omicron**	c. 2008	Holmes Community College	Ridgeland, Mississippi	Active	(Note: The chapter's charter date is approximated. It is in the 2008 yearbook but not the 2007 yearbook.)
**Pi**		Amarillo College	Amarillo, Texas	Active	
	2019	Cypress College	Cypress, California	Active	
		Carl Sandburg College	Galesburg, Illinois	Active	
		Lake Washington Institute of Technology	Kirkland, Washington	Active	
**Phi**		Northampton Community College	Bethlehem, Pennsylvania	Active	

== See also ==
- Professional fraternities and sororities
