= Kappa Gamma Delta =

Professional pre-medical sorority

- ΚΓΔ
- Founded: March 3, 1994; 32 years ago University of California, Davis
- Type: Professional
- Affiliation: Independent
- Status: Active
- Emphasis: Pre-health
- Scope: National
- Motto: "Service to Humanity"
- Pillars: Sisterhood, Professionalism, and Service to Humanity
- Colors: Burgundy, Forest green
- Symbol: Caduceus, wings, and the female symbol
- Flower: White rose
- Chapters: 6
- Nickname: KGD
- Headquarters: One Shields Avenue; CSI Box #405; Davis, California 95616; United States
- Website: www.kappagammadelta.org

Kappa Gamma Delta (ΚΓΔ) is a professional college sorority for women studying medicine and biomedical-related professions.

== History ==
=== Founding ===
Kappa Gamma Delta began during the winter quarter of 1993 at the University of California, Davis when students Charlene Tran and Marge Lee envisioned a professional sorority that would provide support for women during their premedical studies and graduate school. Tran and Lee were supported in their efforts by Sigma Mu Delta, a pre-health fraternity.

The first meeting was held on March 3, 1994, in the lounge of Temescal apartments in Davis. With its founding, Kappa Gamma Delta became the first premedical sorority in the United States of America.

The founding group included these twelve women: Maricris Belisario, Chong Choe, Mindy Compton, Pamela Hy, Marge Lee, Kathy Pham, Jennifer Skinkle Schwartz, Charlene Tran, Gwen Tran, Aileen Tieu, Carolyn Trieu, and Julie Tse.

Its constitution was affirmed on May 30, 1994. The sorority song and oath were adopted on June 10, 1994.

=== Expansion ===
In the Spring of 2002 Kappa Gamma Delta formed its Epsilon chapter at the University of California, Berkeley. In the winter of 2006 Zeta chapter was formed at the University of California, Santa Cruz.

In April 2023 the Eta chapter of Kappa Gamma Delta was formed at the University of Miami in Coral Gables, Florida, marking the organization's first expansion outside of California. This milestone, achieved by Haley Gross, appears to have reignited Kappa Gamma Delta's ambition for growth and expansion, as, building on this momentum, the sorority soon established two additional chapters outside of California: the Theta chapter at Michigan State University founded by Rachel Roberts and the Iota chapter at DePaul University founded by Elise Villwock and Wafa Choubkha.

In 2025, the sorority continued to grow. With new chapters forming at Florida State University and University of North Carolina, Kappa Gamma Delta expanded its national footprint even further, demonstrating a renewed commitment to bringing pre‑health leadership, service, and community to campuses across the country. These additions signaled not only steady organizational growth but also a widening recognition of the sorority’s mission beyond its West Coast origins, positioning Kappa Gamma Delta as an emerging national presence within the pre‑health Greek community.

== Symbols ==
The Kappa Gamma Delta motto is "Service to Humanity". Its pillars are Sisterhood, Professionalism, and Service to Humanity. Its colors are burgundy and forest green. Its symbols are the caduceus, wings, and the female symbol. Its flower is the white rose. The sorority's nickname is KGD.

Kappa Gamma Delta's first Coat-of-Arms consisted of an open book, a haystack, the sorority flower, the female symbol, and an Oil lamp. The haystack was later replaced by a torch surrounded by several rings.

== Activities ==
As stated in the individual chapter's constitutions, the chapters all focus on hosting social, service, and academic events to support members throughout their undergraduate studies.

The sorority participates in service projects such as the Bay to Breakers and various symposia such as "Life During and After Medical School. Its philanthropies vary by chapter and include Relay for Life and the Bone Marrow National Registry.

== Chapters ==
Chapter list from the national website. Active chapters are noted in bold, and inactive chapters are noted in italics.

Chapters	Charter date and range	Institution	Location	Status	Ref.
**Alpha**	March 3, 1994	University of California, Davis	Davis, California	Active	
Beta				Unassigned	
Gamma				Unassigned	
Delta				Unassigned	
**Epsilon**	2002	University of California, Berkeley	Berkeley, California	Active	
**Zeta**	2006	University of California, Santa Cruz	Santa Cruz, California	Active	
**Eta**	April 2023	University of Miami	Coral Gables, Florida	Active	
**Theta**	2023	Michigan State University	East Lansing, Michigan	Active	
**Iota**	2023	DePaul University	Chicago, Illinois	Active	
**Lambda**	2025	Florida State University	Tallahassee, Florida	Active	
**Mu**	2025	University of North Carolina	Chapel Hill, North Carolina	Active	

== See also ==
- Professional fraternities and sororities
