= Mu Beta Psi =

American collegiate service and music fraternity

- ΜΒΨ
- Founded: November 5, 1925; 100 years ago North Carolina State University
- Type: Service
- Affiliation: Independent
- Status: Active
- Emphasis: Music performers, students, and enthusiasts
- Scope: National
- Motto: "May Brotherhood Prevail"
- Colors: Red and White
- Flower: Red and White American Beauty Rose
- Publication: The Clef
- Chapters: 20
- Headquarters: Raleigh, North Carolina; United States
- Website: www.mubetapsi.org

Mu Beta Psi National Honorary Musical Fraternity (ΜΒΨ) is a service and music fraternity founded at North Carolina State University in 1925.

Although an honorary fraternity, Mu Beta Psi views itself as primarily a music service group. The national fraternity and several chapters run scholarship programs and pride themselves on providing service to their music departments.

Any member of the fraternity is referred to as a brother without regard to the member's sex. This practice comes from the fraternity's beginnings and is used in context as a designation of membership, not of gender.

== History ==
=== Founding and early years ===
Mu Beta Psi National Honorary Musical Fraternity was founded on November 5, 1925, at North Carolina State College (now North Carolina State University) by music director Percy W. "Daddy" Price and a group of twelve men from the class of 1926 who were involved in campus music organizations. The purposes of the fraternity were to promote music in its proper place as an educational subject, foster a fellowship among musicians, and stimulate interest in music across the college campus. Over the next few years, Price determined that the fraternity was different from the other music groups on campus and decided to expand it into a national fraternity.

Beta chapter was established at Davidson College in early 1929. The two chapters met in late 1929 and early 1930, resulting in the adoption of the fraternity's constitution. The national organization was founded on April 26, 1930, accompanied by the elections of the first national officers. Price pushed hard for the fraternity's expansion. Some of the earliest prospects included Wake Forest and the College of William & Mary.

Price died in 1933 and was succeeded by Christian D. Kutschinski as music director. Kutschinski became National Executive Secretary in the mid-1930s and sought to expand the fraternity. Despite the challenges of the Great Depression and the Beta chapter going inactive, Delta chapter was established at Clemson University in 1937.

=== World War II and the 1950s ===
World War II brought about new challenges for Mu Beta Psi. As many students entered the armed forces, chapter activity was limited. With the war's conclusion, Kutschinski helped the Delta chapter reorganize. Alpha and Delta chapters met for a National Convention in 1949. During the 1950s, the majority of activities took place on the local level, with minimal collaboration between the chapters. The first post-war National Convention was held in 1957.

=== 1960s ===
At the 1961 National Convention, Mu Beta Psi amended its constitution to allow membership to women. Additionally, a national publication, The Clef, was established. New expansion efforts were also put into place.

Kutschinski stepped down as National Executive Secretary in 1962. Three years later, Ralph W. Daniel was elected to the position and served for the next eighteen years. Two new chapters were installed: the Epsilon chapter at Washington & Lee University in 1965 and the Zeta chapter at Michigan Technological University in 1967. The latter was the result of a merger with Tri-Beta Honorary Band Fraternity. In 1967, "Hail the Spirit," written by Milton C. Bliss, was adopted as the fraternity's song.

=== 1970s and 1980s ===
The Mu Beta Psi Alumni Association was formally established in early 1970, providing college graduates with a chapter to continue participating in the fraternity's activities. The short-lived Eta chapter was installed at Virginia Military Institute in mid-1970. Theta chapter was established at Saint Augustine's College in 1973 and remained active for thirteen years. Iota chapter was established at Duke University in 1981 and went inactive three years later. Kappa chapter was established at Wofford College in 1989. In the mid-1980s, the fraternity created its Permanent Board of Trustees to ensure the organization's stability. The first members of the Permanent Board included Wallace DesChamps, Charlie Emki, David Wilson, and Bryan Reamer.

=== 1990s ===
In the early 1990s, the national organization underwent a reorganization with the creation of new national offices, including the vice president of chapter maintenance, vice president of expansion, national treasurer, and national historian. The National Constitution was revised and approved in 1996. Lambda chapter was established at Anderson University in 1991, only to go inactive a year later. Mu chapter was established in 1993 at the University of North Carolina at Chapel Hill and would remain active for nineteen years. The fraternity extended northward with the establishment of the Nu chapter at SUNY Oswego in 1994 and Xi chapter at Saint Vincent College in 1996.

=== 2000s ===
In 2001, there were fifteen chapters of Mu Beta Psi. Five new chapters were established in the 2000s. Omicron chapter was established at Roanoke College in 2001. In 2007, the brothers of Mu Upsilon Alpha at Rutgers University merged with Mu Beta Psi to establish Pi chapter. Rho chapter was established at Northern Michigan University in 2008. A year later, Mu Beta Psi crossed the Mississippi River for the first time with the establishment of Sigma chapter at Saint Louis University in 2009; although, it would quickly go inactive.

=== 2010s ===
During the 2010s, Mu Beta Psi officially established a national scholarship that is open to college students at the locations where it maintains active chapters. In 2011, the Tau chapter was established at American University in Washington, D.C. The position of chief financial officer was added to the Permanent Board. At the 2018 Convention, all national policies were amended with gender neutral language, as the organization accepts members without regard to their gender identity. A new fraternal life and conduct policy was also adopted "to achieve the safest environment possible for our members, pledges, and guests."

The fraternity's Alumni Association is based in Raleigh, North Carolina.

== Symbols ==
Mu Beta Psi's motto is "May Brotherhood Prevail". The fraternity's colors are red and white, taken from the colors of its founding institution. Its flowers are the red and white American Beauty rose. Its publication is The Clef.

The fraternity's coat of arms features a shield with a red field that features the pipes of Pan, a lyre, a horn, and a harp. Above is the lamp of learning that rests on top of books of learning. Below is the motto with the Greek letters ΜΒΨ.

Mu Beta Psi's badge is a red enameled Reuleaux triangle with the Greek letters ΜΒΨ in white. The badge may be plain or set with pearls or with rubies in the corners. Its pledge pin is a plain red Redleaux triangle without the Greek letters.

== Chapters ==
Following is a list of Mu Beta Psi chapters in charter order, with active chapters indicated in bold and inactive chapters in italics.

Chapter	Charter date and range	Institution	Location	Status	Ref.
**Alpha**	November 5, 1925	North Carolina State University	Raleigh, North Carolina	Active	
Beta	February 9, 1929 – c. 1935	Davidson College	Davidson, North Carolina	Inactive	
Gamma				Unissued	(Note: Gamma chapter was never formally designated; Percy W. Price died before a school could be finalized and a charter issued, and the effort was lost. Records indicate that the Gamma chapter was to be established at The College of William and Mary, but colonization efforts were ultimately unsuccessful.)
Delta	January 16, 1937 – 2005	Clemson University	Clemson, South Carolina	Inactive	
Epsilon	April 11, 1965 – c. 1986	Washington and Lee University	Lexington, Virginia	Inactive	
**Zeta**	November 23, 1967	Michigan Technological University	Houghton, Michigan	Active	(Note: Chapter resulted from a merger with the Tri-Beta Honorary Band Fraternity.)
**Alumni Association**	March 21, 1970		Raleigh, North Carolina	Active	(Note: Mu Beta Psi Alumni Association is a separate organization but is considered an active chapter. The Alumni Association is open to alumni of all Mu Beta Psi chapters, active or otherwise.)
Eta	May 5, 1970 – 1971	Virginia Military Institute	Lexington, Virginia	Inactive	
Theta	November 22, 1973 – c. 1987	Saint Augustine's College	Raleigh, North Carolina	Inactive	
Iota	March 1, 1981 – c. 1984	Duke University	Durham, North Carolina	Inactive	
**Kappa**	February 19, 1989 – 1996; April 25, 2020	Wofford College	Spartanburg, South Carolina	Active	
Lambda	April 24, 1991 – 1992	Anderson University	Anderson, South Carolina	Inactive	
Mu	April 4, 1993 – 2012	University of North Carolina at Chapel Hill	Chapel Hill, North Carolina	Inactive	
**Nu**	April 10, 1994	State University of New York at Oswego	Oswego, New York	Active	
Xi	November 17, 1996 – 2006	Saint Vincent College	Unity Township, Pennsylvania	Inactive	
Omicron	March 31, 2001 – 2017	Roanoke College	Salem, Virginia	Inactive	
**Pi**	October 7, 2007	Rutgers University–New Brunswick	New Brunswick, New Jersey	Active	(Note: Chapter formed by merging with Mu Upsilon Alpha, an honorary, co-educational service fraternity of the Rutgers University Bands.)
**Rho**	November 16, 2008	Northern Michigan University	Marquette, Michigan	Active	
Sigma	November 7, 2009 – 2010	Saint Louis University	St. Louis, Missouri	Inactive	
Tau	April 10, 2011 – 2026	American University	Washington, D.C.	Inactive	
Upsilon	November 17, 2019 – 2024	Stetson University	DeLand, Florida	Inactive	

== Notable alumni ==
- Lachi (Mu) – singer-songwriter, producer, author, and founder of the UNC Cadence
- L. Macon Epps (Alpha) – inventor and engineer with Grumman Aerospace Corporation, assistant program manager on the Apollo Lunar Module
- Tamar Greene (Nu) – Broadway singer; assumed the role of George Washington in Hamilton in January 2020

== See also ==
- Professional fraternities and sororities
