= Mu Epsilon Delta =

American fraternity for pre-med students

- ΜΕΔ
- Founded: 1965; 61 years ago University of Tennessee at Martin
- Type: Professional
- Affiliation: Independent
- Status: Active
- Emphasis: Pre-health fields
- Scope: National
- Motto: "With purity and passion I pass my life and practice my art."
- Pillars: Brotherhood, Service, and Leadership
- Colors: Maroon and Gold
- Symbol: Caduceus
- Flower: Red Rambling Rose
- Jewel: Ruby
- Chapters: 15
- Headquarters: Ann Arbor, Michigan; United States
- Website: mednational.org

Mu Epsilon Delta (ΜΕΔ), also known as MED, is an American national co-ed fraternity for those who are interested in or currently studying in the pre-medical field. It was established at the University of Tennessee at Martin in 1965.

== History ==
Mu Epsilon Delta was founded in 1965 at the University of Tennessee at Martin. The co-ed fraternity is a service organization and is recognized as such. It functions as a non-profit, national health science, honor, and service pre-professional organization and operates for the benefit of its members. This organization is intended to provide information about the medical field and to promote campus interest in the medical professions.

== Symbols ==
The symbol of Mu Epsilon Delta is the Caduceus, which features two snakes on a winged staff. Tracing its lineage back to Greek Mythology the Caduceus is most commonly associated with Hermes, the "messenger of the gods". The similarity of the Caduceus to the unnamed staff of Asclepius, the Greco-Roman god of medicine is what largely led to its wide use as the symbol of physicians, the US Army Medical Corps, and pre-professional fraternities such as Mu Epsilon Delta.

The colors of Mu Epsilon Delta are red and gold. The fraternity's flower is the red rambling rose. Its motto is "With purity and passion I pass my life and practice my art." Its pillars are brotherhood, service, and leadership.

== Chapters ==
As of 2026, fifteen chapters are active. Following are the chapters of Mu Epsilon Delta.

Charter date	Institution	Location	Status	Ref.
1965	University of Tennessee at Martin	Martin, Tennessee	Active	
2019	University of Michigan	Ann Arbor, Michigan	Active	
2020	Michigan State University	East Lansing, Michigan	Active	
2022	Grand Valley State University	Allendale, Michigan	Active	
2023	University of South Florida	Tampa, Florida	Active	
2023	University of Illinois Urbana-Champaign	Urbana, Illinois	Active	
2024	University of Massachusetts Amherst	Amherst, Massachusetts	Active	
2024	Virginia Polytechnic Institute and State University	Blacksburg, Virginia	Active	
2024	University of Wisconsin Madison	Madison, Wisconsin	Active	
2024	North Carolina State University	Raleigh, North Carolina	Active	
2025	Alabama Agricultural and Mechanical University	Huntsville, Alabama	Active	
2025	University of Pittsburgh	Pittsburgh, Pennsylvania	Active	
2025	University of Iowa	Iowa City, Iowa	Active	
2025	University of Virginia	Charlottesville, Virginia	Active	
2025	Rutgers University-New Brunswick	New Brunswick, New Jersey	Active	
	Lipscomb University	Nashville, Tennessee	Inactive	
	University of Tulsa	Tulsa, Oklahoma	Inactive	
	University of Kansas	Lawrence, Kansas	Inactive	
