= Pi Delta Nu =

Former women's fraternity at the University of Missouri

- ΠΔΝ
- Founded: April 12, 1921; 105 years ago University of Missouri
- Type: Professional
- Affiliation: Independent
- Status: Defunct
- Defunct date: After 1956
- Emphasis: Chemistry
- Scope: National
- Motto: "Victory Through Foresight"
- Colors: Gentian violet and Gold
- Publication: The Retort
- Chapters: 5
- Headquarters: United States

Pi Delta Nu (ΠΔΝ) was a small national professional fraternity for women in chemistry, founded in 1921 at the University of Missouri. It chartered at least five chapters and survived into the 1950s.

== History ==
Pi Delta Nu was created as the Women's Chemistry Club, established at the University of Missouri in 1919. In 1920, the name of the group was changed to the Retort, and on April 12, 1921, the club was reorganized as Pi Delta Nu, a professional fraternity for women in chemistry. The name change was in advance of planning to become a national organization. The sorority had three purposes: "To bring together women interested in science, to help fit women for scientific careers, and to inculcate scholarly ideals in its members".

Charter members were Margaret Baxter, Majory Austry, Ada Brainard, Mary V. Dover, Eastern M. Griffith, Agnes Hays, Dorothy V. Nightingale, Grave Petty, Ruth Rusk, Esther W. Stearn, Helen Wamsley, Mollie G. White, Ruth Woodworth, and Kathryn Wyant. Stearn was its first president. During the first meeting, the members decided to raise funds to support Marie Curie's work with radium.

Annual editions of the Missouri Savitar yearbook show that the fraternity continued until at least 1956 at the school. Beta chapter formed at the University of Minnesota and likewise remained active until at least 1956. Gamma chapter was established at Syracuse University, with active members at least until 1940. Delta chapter formed at the University of Buffalo in 1929, and Epsilon chapter at Montana State College in 1930.

The society was originally organized for women in chemistry but changed its scope to include girls interested in the fields of bacteriology, zoology, pre-medicine, and physical therapy. The first two editions of the Missouri Savitar yearbook that include the group list the society as "Pi Delta Nu and the Retort" may have evolved from a publication committee.

== Symbols ==
Pi Delta Nu's badge was originally an oblong square in gold, with a band in the center supporting its letters. By 1935, this was replaced by a stylized pin in gold, consisting of two equilateral triangles pointing up and down and overlapping, with the raised Greek letters ΠΔΝ on a center band. Above the letters was a retort and below an emerald. The pin was surrounded by 22 pearls, eleven above and eleven below. The pledge pin is a small silver retort with the letters ΠΔΝ on the bowl.

The crest consists of a knight bearing upon his shoulder the balanced scale of justice and on his arm a shield upon which is a retort, a helix, a crucible, a scalpel, and an open book. Underneath is a scroll bearing the words "Pi Delta Nu" in Greek script. Its motto, as cited soon after World War II, was "Victory Through Foresight".

The fraternity's colors were gentian violet and gold. Gentian violet was noteworthy as the name of a dye used in antibacterial and classification procedures. The sorority's flower was the violet, and its magazine was The Retort.

== Membership ==
Undergraduate and graduate women taking chemistry as a principal or secondary subject of specialization were eligible for membership.

== Chapters ==
Chapters of Pi Delta Nu, as of 1935.

Chapter	Charter date and range	Institution	Location	Status	Ref.
Alpha	April 12, 1921 – after 1956	University of Missouri	Columbia, Missouri	Inactive	
Beta	1925–after 1956	University of Minnesota	Minneapolis, Minnesota	Inactive	(Note: This chapter formed from Alpha Kappa Epsilon.)
Gamma	1927–after 1940	Syracuse University	Syracuse, New York	Inactive	
Delta	1929	University of Buffalo	Buffalo, New York	Inactive	
Epsilon	1930	Montana State College	Bozeman, Montana	Inactive	

== See also ==
- Professional fraternities and sororities
