= Beta Phi Sigma =

American pharmacy fraternity

- ΒΦΣ
- Founded: December 15, 1888; 137 years ago Buffalo School of Pharmacy
- Type: Professional
- Affiliation: Independent
- Status: Defunct
- Defunct date: 1973
- Emphasis: Pharmacy
- Scope: National
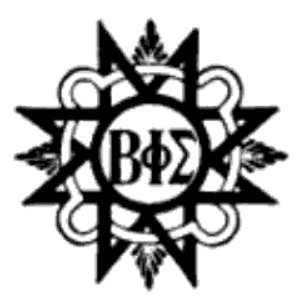
- Member badge
- Colors: Blue and White
- Publication: The Adelphos
- Chapters: 11
- Headquarters: Buffalo, New York; United States

Beta Phi Sigma (ΒΦΣ) was an American pharmacy fraternity. Beta Phi Sigma stands for Buffalo Pharmacy School. Beta Phi Sigma was the first Greek-letter fraternity at the University at Buffalo and the first Greek-letter Pharmaceutical fraternity in the United States.

== History ==
The fraternity was founded in the office of Dr. Henry G. Bentz on the night of December 15, 1888. Originally organized by the graduating classes of 1889, Beta Phi Sigma grew from one chapter, Alpha, at the University at Buffalo to eleven chapters before World War II. The induction of so many males into the military decimated the ranks of Pharmacy students so that by the end of World War II Beta Phi Sigma ceased to exist.

Alpha chapter was reorganized at the University at Buffalo Pharmacy School. This chapter grew until 1973 when the influx of women to the profession reduced the number of men pledging the fraternity; Beta Phi Sigma was dissolved.

There is still an alumni chapter that holds a reunion every ten years, the first being held in 1997.

== Symbols and traditions ==
The name Beta Phi Sigma was selected to stand for Buffalo Pharmacy School. The fraternity's colors were blue and white. Its publication was The Adelphos.

Found in the University at Buffalo School of Pharmacy and Pharmaceutical Science Apothecary archives, Beta Phi Sigma had the following song, set in B-flat major:

Join hands again and sing for Beta Phi
and pledge anew our vows so firm and high.
To stand for the right and to shun the wrong
forever in our hearts a song.
So now to thee oh Beta Phi we bring
our love and our most humble off-ring.
As we answer the call we'll be true one and all
to the vows we made to thee oh Beta Phi.

== Chapters ==
Following are the former and current chapters of Beta Phi Sigma. Active chapters are indicated in bold; inactive chapters are indicated in italic.

Chapter	Charter date and range	Institution	Location	Status	Ref.
Alpha	1889–194x ?, 19xx ?–1973	Buffalo School of Pharmacy	Buffalo, NY	Inactive	
Beta	1900–194x ?	Pittsburgh School of Pharmacy	Pittsburgh, PA	Inactive	(Note: Chapter closed because of World War II)
Gamma	1911–194x ?	Philadelphia College of Pharmacy	Philadelphia, PA	Inactive	
Delta	1919–194x ?	Tulane University	New Orleans, LA	Inactive	
Epsilon	1923–194x ?	University of Iowa	Iowa City, IA	Inactive	
Zeta	1923–194x ?	Kansas State University	Lawrence, KS	Inactive	
Eta	1923–194x ?	Texas State University	Galveston, TX	Inactive	
Theta	1923–194x ?	Baylor University	Dallas, TX	Inactive	
Iota	1923–194x ?	Atlanta College of Pharmacy	Atlanta, GA	Inactive	
Kappa	1924–194x ?	Wisconsin State University	Madison, WI	Inactive	
Lambda	August 11, 1924–194x ?	Loyola University	New Orleans, LA	Inactive	

== See also ==
- Professional fraternities and sororities
- Rho Chi, co-ed, pharmacy honor society
