= Alpha Epsilon Iota =

Professional fraternity

- ΑΕΙ
- Founded: February 26, 1890; 136 years ago University of Michigan
- Type: Professional
- Affiliation: Independent
- Status: Defunct
- Defunct date: March 1963
- Emphasis: Medical
- Scope: National
- Colors: Black, White and Green
- Symbol: Serpent
- Flower: White carnation
- Jewel: Emerald
- Publication: The Directory-Journal
- Chapters: 31
- Members: 4,000 lifetime
- Headquarters: United States

Alpha Epsilon Iota (ΑΕΙ) was an American professional fraternity for women in the field of medicine. It was established in 1890 at the University of Michigan in Ann Arbor, Michigan. It established 31 chapters before gong inactive in 1963.

== History ==
Alpha Epsilon Iota was established as a medical fraternity for women on February 26, 1890 at the University of Michigan in Ann Arbor, Michigan. Its founders were Lotta Ruth Arwine-Suverkrup, Ada Fenimore Bock, Anna Ward Croacher, Lily Mac Gowan-Fellows, and May Belle Stuckey Reynolds. Six grades of members were created: collegiate, graduate, honorary, affiliate, non-graduate, and associate.

Founded prior to the turn of the 20th century, Alpha Epsilon Iota was one of the first professional medical fraternities to include women. It added a Beta chapter at the University of Chicago that same year, cementing its national intentions. By the turn of the century two additional chapters had formed. In 1907, it had 100 active members and 400 lifetime member from nine chapters. Later, growth slowed for the most part, with a flurry of new groups in the 1920, but no new chapters after 1949.

In 1949, Alpha Epsilon Iota had twenty active chapters, six inactive chapters, and 2,000 members. The fraternity dissolved as a national organization in March 1963. It had initiated 4,000 members.

Some chapters continued on as local entities. Minnesota's Epsilon chapter remained active through the 1970s at which time there was a marked expansion of female enrollment in the growing medical school there. Alpha Epsilon Iota sold its properties in 1979, splitting into two groups: the AEI Foundation which continues to provide scholarships, and a networking organization called Minnesota Women Physicians.

== Symbols ==
Alpha Epsilon Iota's badge is described as a "black enameled faceted pentagon, having a gold star at the apex with an emerald inset. The three upper facets contained the Greek letters "ΑΕΙ" in gold, the two lower facets, a gold serpent."

Alpha Epsilon Iota's colors were black, white, and green. The fraternity's flower was the white carnation. Its jewel was the emerald. Its symbol was the serpent. Its biannual publication was The Directory Journal.

== Chapters ==
Following is a list of Alpha Epsilon Iota members, with inactive chapters and institutions in italics.

Chapter	Charter date and range	Institution	Locations	Status	Ref.
Alpha	February 26, 1890 – 19xx ?	University of Michigan	Ann Arbor, Michigan	Inactive	
Beta	1890–1940	University of Chicago	Chicago, Illinois	Inactive	
Gamma	1899–1933	University of Cincinnati	Cincinnati, Ohio	Inactive	
Delta	1899–19xx ?	University of Illinois at Chicago	Chicago, Illinois	Inactive	
Epsilon	1901–1982	University of Minnesota	Minneapolis, Minnesota	Withdrew (local)	
Zeta	1902–19xx ?	Stanford University	Stanford, California	Inactive	
Eta	1902–1913	Cornell University	Ithaca, New York	Inactive	
Theta	1902–19xx ?	Woman's Medical College of Pennsylvania	Philadelphia, Pennsylvania	Inactive	
Iota	1905–before 1949	University of California, San Francisco	San Francisco, California	Inactive	
Kappa	1906–19xx ?	University of California, Los Angeles	Los Angeles, California	Inactive	
Lambda	1909–19xx ?	Syracuse University	Syracuse, New York	Inactive	
Mu	1919–19xx ?	Tulane University	New Orleans, Louisiana	Inactive	
Nu	1902–19xx ?	University of Oklahoma	Norman, Oklahoma	Inactive	
Xi	1922–19xx ?	University of Oregon, Portland	Portland, Oregon	Inactive	
Omicron	1922–1948	University of Kansas	Lawrence, Kansas	Inactive	
Pi	1923–19xx ?	Medical College of Virginia	Richmond, Virginia	Inactive	
Rho	1923–19xx ?	University of Texas at Austin	Austin, Texas	Inactive	
Sigma	1923–19xx ?	Ohio State University	Columbus, Ohio	Inactive	
Tau	February 5, 1926 – 1963	University of Wisconsin–Madison	Madison, Wisconsin	Inactive	
Upsilon	1927–19xx ?	University of Texas Southwestern Medical Center	Dallas, Texas	Inactive	
Phi	1927–19xx ?	George Washington University	Washington, D.C.	Inactive	
Chi	1927–before 1949	Washington University in St. Louis	St. Louis, Missouri	Inactive	
Psi	1938–19xx ?	LSU Health Sciences Center New Orleans	New Orleans, Louisiana	Inactive	
Omega	1940–19xx ?	University of Tennessee	Knoxville, Tennessee	Inactive	
Alpha-Alpha	1941–19xx ?	Marquette University	Milwaukee, Wisconsin	Inactive	
Alpha-Beta	1944–19xx ?	Hahnemann University (Drexel)	Philadelphia, Pennsylvania	Inactive	
Alpha-Gamma	1948–19xx ?	Baylor College of Medicine	Houston, Texas	Inactive	
Alpha-Delta	1948–19xx ?	New York Medical College	Valhalla, New York	Inactive	
Alpha-Epsilon	1948–19xx ?	Temple University	Philadelphia, Pennsylvania	Inactive	
Alpha-Zeta	1949–19xx ?	Creighton University	Omaha, Nebraska	Inactive	
Alpha-Eta	1949–19xx ?	Augusta University	Augusta, Georgia	Inactive	
