= Sigma Iota Epsilon =

American professional management fraternity

- ΣΙΕ
- Founded: January 1927; 99 years ago University of Illinois
- Type: Honor and Professional
- Affiliation: Independent
- Status: Active
- Emphasis: Management
- Scope: National (US)
- Colors: Garnet and Gold
- Symbol: Slater Textile Mill
- Publication: Management Futures; The Manager's Key (formerly)
- Chapters: 73
- Members: 50,000+ lifetime
- Headquarters: 2601 South Minnesota Avenue, Suite 105-302; Sioux Falls, South Dakota 57105; United States
- Website: www.sienational.com

Sigma Iota Epsilon (ΣΙΕ) is an American national honorary and professional management fraternity.

== Purpose ==
The stated goals of Sigma Iota Epsilon are;

- To stimulate interest and achievement in the field of management;
- To stimulate scholarship in management;
- To facilitate contacts between students and practicing managers;
- To recognize persons who have made contributions to the field of management;
- To gain recognition of the contribution and value of scholastic achievement in the management discipline;
- To promote scholarship

== History ==
Sigma Iota Epsilon began as a recognition society for management students, accepting both men and women from inception, in January 1927 at the University of Illinois. Rather than founding members, it was formed as a merger of three local industrial management and general management fraternities located at the University of Illinois, Syracuse University, and the University of Texas. The Society notes that sponsoring professors A.G. Anderson at Illinois, Maurice C. Cross at Syracuse, and Chester F. Lay at Texas coordinated the merger of the local societies they led.

More recently, the society has adopted aspects of both an honor society and a professional fraternity.

In 1991, the fraternity had 33 active chapters and 7 inactive chapters, with approximately 7,500 initiates. Sigma Iota Epsilon has grown since then to include 73 active chapters.

== Symbols ==
The fraternity's letters, ΣΙΕ, represent Sproude or ''Earnestness'', Idreia or ''Knowledge'', and Exoche or ''Excellence''. Its colors are garnet and gold.

The Sigma Iota Epsilon emblem is a rectangular gold key, with the letters ΣΙΕ in red arranged diagonally from the upper left to the lower right. There is an illustration of the Old Slater Textile Mill of Pawtucket, Rhode Island in the upper right corner; this was the first factory in the United States and symbolizes the first application of work of management to factory production. In the lower-left corner is a diagram of a functional organization, as developed by Frederick Winslow Taylor; this symbolizes management techniques.

== Membership ==
Students who have high academic standing and an interest in management or a management-related area (marketing, sports management, hotel and restaurant management, finance, accounting, CIS, etc.) can join Sigma Iota Epsilon.

To be eligible to join, undergraduate students must have at least a 3.25 GPA, received a B or better in at least one management course, and completed one year of college or thirty semester hours at an institution with a chapter. Requirements for graduate students are the same, except for the requirement of a 3.50 GPA or better.

== Chapters ==
The active chapters of Sigma Iota Epsilon are located in the United States. Historically, there was also a chapter in India.

== See also ==
- Honor society
- Professional fraternities and sororities
