= Zeta Phi (professional) =

North American medical women's fraternity

- ΖΦ
- Founded: May 29, 1900; 126 years ago Syracuse University College of Medicine
- Type: Professional
- Affiliation: Independent
- Status: Defunct
- Emphasis: Medicine
- Scope: International
- Colors: Black, White, and Gold
- Flower: Daisy
- Chapters: 10
- Headquarters: United States

Zeta Phi (ΖΦ) was an international professional women's fraternity for medicine. It was established in 1900 at the Syracuse University College of Medicine in Syracuse, New York. It established chapters in the United States, Canada, Mexico, and South Africa before going inactive in the 1980s.

== History ==
Zeta Phi was a medical women's fraternity that was established at the Syracuse University College of Medicine in Syracuse, New York, on May 29, 1900. The founders announced the fraternity's establishment in September 1900. Its purpose was "to bring the women of the medical profession into closer touch with one another".

Zeta Phi's founders were Anna T. Bingham, Emma C. Clark, Phoebe Anna Ferris, Elizabeth L. Shrimpton, Mary F. Sweet, and Anna B. White. Elizabeth Blackwell, the first women physician and a prior graduate of the Syracuse University College of Medicine, was an honorary charter member of the fraternity.

The fraternity added a second chapter at the Women's Medical College of Pennsylvania in 1903, followed by a third chapter at Johns Hopkins University in 1906. Gamma at Johns Hopkins University rented a chapter house. Zeta Phi became international with the addition of a chapter at the University of Toronto in 1907. A chapter was added at Tufts College Medical School in 1909.

Membership in Zeta Phi was open to women studying medicine and women doctors, with the latter being initiated at the fraternity's conventions. In 1907, Zeta Phi had 25 active members and a total of 100 members. In 1912, it had five active chapters and 125 members. Its membership had grown to 45 active members and 400 lifetime members by 1923. A chapter was installed at the University of Pittsburgh School of Medicine in 1928.

The sorority had active chapters into the 1980s.

== Symbols ==
The fraternity's Greek letters stand for Zeuxis philōa. Zeta Phi's badge was a black enamel quatrefoil, bearing the Greek letters "ΖΦ" in white to the left and right of a white winged caduceus with a gold serpent. The sorority's colors were black, white, and gold. Its flower was the daisy.

== Philanthropy ==
Members of Zeta Phi raised funds to support a medical student loan fund.

== Chapters ==
Following are the chapters of Zeta Phi, with inactive chapters and institutions indicated in italics.

Chapter	Charter date and range	Institution	Location	Status	Ref.
Alpha	May 29, 1900 – 1912	Syracuse University College of Medicine	Syracuse, New York	Inactive	
Beta	1903	Women's Medical College of Pennsylvania	Philadelphia, Pennsylvania	Inactive	(Note: Woman's Medical College of Pennsylvania became the Medical College of Pennsylvania in 1970 and merged to form Drexel University College of Medicine in 1993.)
Gamma	1906–1914	Johns Hopkins University	Baltimore, Maryland	Inactive	
Delta	1907	University of Toronto	Toronto, Ontario, Canada	Inactive	
Epsilon	1909–after 1937	Tufts College Medical School	Boston, Massachusetts	Inactive	
Theta	May 18, 1928	University of Pittsburgh School of Medicine	Pittsburgh, Pennsylvania	Inactive	(Note: Chapter formed from Sigma Sigma Epsilon, a local women's medical fraternity.)
	19xx ?	Columbia University College of Physicians and Surgeons	Manhattan, New York	Inactive	
	19xx ?	Faculty of Medicine, National Autonomous University of Mexico	Mexico City, Mexico	Inactive	
	19xx ?	New York Homeopathic Medical College	Manhattan, New York	Inactive	
	19xx ?	University of the Witwatersrand	Johannesburg, South Africa	Inactive	

== Governance ==
The fraternity was governed by five national officers, elected through a biennial convention. Its officers included president, vice president, secretary, and treasurer.

Zeta Phi's fifth convention was held in Toronto in 1909 and 1910. The convention was held in Boston in 1911, Syracuse in 1913, and Boston in 1923. The 1925 convention was in New York City. The 1932 convention was held in Pittsburgh, Pennsylvania.

== Notable members ==
- Elizabeth Blackwell, the first women physician
- Dorothy Boulding Ferebee, obstetrician and civil rights activist
- Esther Silveus, radiologist and medical researcher based at the Lahey Clinic

== See also ==
- Professional fraternities and sororities
