= Kappa Theta Pi =

American information technology fraternity

- ΚΘΠ
- Founded: January 10, 2012; 14 years ago University of Michigan
- Type: Professional
- Affiliation: Independent
- Status: Active
- Emphasis: Technology
- Scope: National
- Slogan: The love for technology
- Colors: Blue and Green
- Mascot: Ninja
- Chapters: 29
- Colonies: 1
- Members: 700+ active 1300+ lifetime
- Headquarters: 105 S State Street; Ann Arbor, Michigan 48109; United States
- Website: Official website

Kappa Theta Pi (ΚΘΠ, also known as KTP) is a co-ed professional fraternity specializing in the field of information technology. Kappa Theta Pi was founded on January 10, 2012, in Ann Arbor, Michigan, and is the University of Michigan's first professional technology fraternity. The goals of the fraternity are to create bonds between students of Informatics, computer science, business, design, computer engineering, Information, and any others who are interested in technology, to develop networks through facilitation of professional and social growth, and to expose members to career options in the technology field.

== History ==
In November 2011, two students, Louise Vongphrachanh and Jing Guo, founded a professional fraternity aimed towards informatics students. As many of these students were often in multiple classes together, a fraternity was organized to foster both professional and social relationships. After gaining support and conducting interviews, a group of seven Informatics students became the founding class and first executive board. These seven individuals are Nisha Dwivedi, Jacqueline Fontaine, Jing Guo, Brian Mansfield, Denny Tsai, Julia Varghese, and Louise Vongphrachanh.

Vongphrachanh and Guo signed the charter and became co-presidents of the fraternity. Later, the fraternity's focus was broadened to include all students interested in information technology. Although the fraternity is aimed toward information technology, Kappa Theta Pi has made continuous efforts to connect with students regardless of their technical and academic backgrounds.

In Spring 2013, the University of Michigan School of Information formally sponsored the fraternity.

According to Kappa Theta Pi's constitution, the purpose of the fraternity can be detailed in six statements: Kappa Theta Pi works to build an active community of students with a shared interest in technology; it sponsors events and activities aimed toward intellectual, social, and professional development; it provides academic and professional resources to members; it fosters relationships among the local community, and with corporations; it provides service and philanthropy to the local community; and it works to maintain lifelong cooperation and friendship among its members.

== Symbols ==
The Colors of the fraternity are blue (#458FFB) and green (#19FF11). The hexadecimal color values represent the technical roots of the fraternity.

== Membership ==
Kappa Theta Pi's process for membership follows standard Greek rush and pledge guidelines. The fraternity's rush process occurs in both Fall and Winter semesters.

== Governance ==
The executive board of the Alpha chapter of Kappa Theta Pi currently consists of the President, Vice President of External Affairs, Vice President of Internal Affairs, Vice President of Finance, Vice President of Engagement, Vice President of Membership, Vice President of Marketing, Vice President of Professional Development, and Vice President of Technical Development. Elections for each Executive Board position occurs at the beginning of every calendar year. Each active member of the fraternity is required to complete community service hours as well as attend professional development events. There are committees dedicated to fostering the growth and development of the fraternity. Each member must be part of a committee to actively contribute to the fraternity as a whole.

== Chapters ==
In the following list, active chapters are noted in bold and inactive chapters are in italics.

Chapter	Charter date and range	Institution	Location	Status	Ref.
**Alpha**	January 10, 2012	University of Michigan	Ann Arbor, Michigan	Active	
**Beta**	pre- 2016	University of Pittsburgh	Pittsburgh, Pennsylvania	Active	
**Gamma**	pre- 2016	Rose-Hulman Institute of Technology	Terre Haute, Indiana	Active	
**Delta**	November 9, 2017	Syracuse University School of Information Studies	Syracuse, New York	Active	
**Epsilon**	November 8, 2017	University of Maryland, College Park	College Park, Maryland	Active	
**Zeta**	November 7, 2019	The College of New Jersey	Ewing, New Jersey	Active	
**Eta**	June 2020	University of North Carolina at Chapel Hill	Chapel Hill, North Carolina	Active	
**Theta**	November 7, 2020	University of Chicago	Chicago, Illinois	Active	
**Iota**	March 9, 2022	University of Texas at Austin	Austin, Texas	Active	
**Kappa**	August 2, 2022	Northwestern University	Evanston, Illinois	Active	
**Lambda**	October 27, 2022	Boston University	Boston, Massachusetts	Active	
**Mu**	April 30, 2023	University of Texas at Dallas	Richardson, Texas	Active	
**Nu**	March 20, 2023	University of Colorado Boulder	Boulder, Colorado	Active	
Xi				Unassigned	
Omicron				Unassigned	
Pi				Unassigned	
**Rho**	April 26, 2023	Vanderbilt University	Nashville, Tennessee	Active	
**Sigma**	August 30, 2023	University of Miami	Coral Gables, Florida	Active	
**Tau**	April 6, 2023	University of Southern California	Los Angeles, California	Active	
**Upsilon**		Lewis University	Romeoville, Illinois	Colony	
**Phi**	December 3, 2024	University of Georgia	Athens, Georgia	Active	
**Chi**	November 21, 2024	Nova Southeastern University	Fort Lauderdale, Florida	Active	
**Psi**	March 18, 2024	Cameron University	Lawton, Oklahoma	Active	
**Omega**	June 1, 2024	Northeastern University	Boston, Massachusetts	Active	
**Alpha Alpha**	September 21, 2024	University of Central Arkansas	Conway, Arkansas	Active	
**Alpha Beta**	June 20, 2024	Rutgers University–New Brunswick	New Brunswick, New Jersey	Active	
**Alpha Gamma**	June 18, 2024	Virginia Tech	Blacksburg, Virginia	Active	
**Alpha Delta**	September 26, 2024	Ohio State University	Columbus, Ohio	Active	
**Alpha Epsilon**	January 23, 2025	Cornell University	Ithaca, New York	Active	
**Alpha Zeta**	April 22, 2025	University of Virginia	Charlottesville, Virginia	Active	
**Alpha Eta**	February 7, 2025	Indiana University Bloomington	Bloomington, Indiana	Active	
**Alpha Theta**	November 20, 2025	University of South Carolina	Columbia, South Carolina	Active	
**Alpha Iota**	June 10, 2025	University of Washington	Seattle, Washington	Active	
**Alpha Kappa**	January 6, 2026	Purdue University	West Lafayette, Indiana	Active	

== See also ==
- Professional fraternities and sororities
