= Alpha Tau Alpha =

American agricultural education honor society

- ΑΤΑ
- Founded: October 27, 1921; 105 years ago University of Illinois at Urbana-Champaign
- Type: Professional
- Affiliation: Independent
- Status: Active
- Emphasis: Agricultural and Extension Education
- Scope: National
- Colors: Orange and Brown
- Symbol: Sheaves of Wheat, Book, Lamp
- Publication: The Alphan
- Chapters: 32 (1979)
- Members: 13,767 (1979) lifetime
- Headquarters: Alpha Tau Alpha c/o University of Minnesota; Learning and Environmental Sciences; 1954 Buford Avenue; St. Paul, Minnesota 55108; United States
- Website: www.ataonline.org

Alpha Tau Alpha (ΑΤΑ) is an American professional honor society for those who have chosen a major in agricultural education or extension education.

== History ==
The general purpose of vocational agriculture-to educate present and prospective farmers for proficiency in farming—created throughout this nation a band of men dedicated to the improvement of agriculture through education. These men were of a unique profession and one individual, Dr. A. W Nolan, conceived the idea of a professional organization for them.

On October 20, 1921, a group of men at the University of Illinois, College of Agriculture, met to plan and organize a group for those pursuing a career in Agricultural Education or Extension Education. On April 27, 1922, plans were developed to nationalize the fraternity. After the plans were in place, the corresponding secretary was elected in March 1923 to contact other colleges concerning the organization of Alpha Tau Alpha chapters. Colleges with an Agricultural Education or Extension Education program were contacted. On March 4, 1924, the University of Illinois granted Alpha chapter of ΑΤΑ a permit for a national constitution.

The interest of A. W. Nolan in Alpha Tau Alpha continued beyond his retirement at the University of Illinois in 1938. He served as president until the national fraternity was reactivated following World War II. He was awarded a life membership in the American Vocational Association in recognition of his services as founder and president of ΑΤΑ.

== Organization Insignia ==
The Insignia was designed for the use of the national organization or local chapters. Parts of the Insignia are the equilateral triangle with the words Physical, Intellectual, and Spiritual making up the three sides, an ΑΤΑ bond of fellowship that ties the sides together, the open book and the lamp of knowledge, supported by two sheaves of wheat. The Insignia is protected by copyright.

The official colors of Alpha Tau Alpha are orange and brown.

== Purpose ==
The purpose of Alpha Tau Alpha is to promote standards of agricultural education and foster relationships among individuals majoring in agricultural education or extension education. By studying the lives, preparation, and personalities of educators, and developing an understanding of vocations in agriculture and the lives of those engaged in them, members aim to become agricultural educators who lead individuals in the vocation of agriculture toward success.

ΑΤΑ members seek to find and enjoy the fellowship of individuals of high scholarship, of true teaching ideals, and of sincere desire to serve in agricultural leadership.

== Membership Types ==
A. Active Membership - Qualifications for active membership in Alpha Tau Alpha may exceed, if a chapter wishes, but shall not be less than the following:

1. Be an Agricultural Education or Extension Education major (or equivalent) or have an emphasis in this area.
2. Be enrolled in at least the sophomore year as defined by the local department.
3. Have at least a 2.5 GPA on a 4.0 scale or a 3.5 GPA on a 5.0 scale.

B. Associate Membership - Associate membership shall be limited to those persons actively engaged in agricultural education or extension education professions.

C. Honorary Membership

1. Honorary membership shall be limited to those persons engaged in agricultural leadership; to those desiring to promote the welfare of community life; and to those promoting agricultural education.
2. Nominations with the appropriate information about each nominee shall be submitted to the national secretary at least one month prior to the National Conclave. A screening committee, composed of one national officer and two student members appointed by the national president, shall investigate the nominations and make recommendations at a business session of the National Conclave. Two-thirds (2/3) of the delegates present at the Conclave showing an affirmative vote is sufficient to elect new honorary members to membership. The initiation of the new members will be held at the National Conclave the following year.

D. National Membership - When the national initiation fee is received by the national secretary, the members of chapters automatically become members of the national body and constitute the membership of the organization.

E. Transfer of Membership - Membership may be transferred from one chapter to another at the member's request, by notifying the secretary of the chapter the member is joining and notifying the national secretary of the transfer and the roll number assigned to the member.

== ΑΤΑ Today ==
=== National Conclave ===
The Alpha Tau Alpha National Conclave is held in conjunction with the National FFA Convention each October. All ΑΤΑ chapters are invited to attend. Business meetings are held in which any delegate matters are voted on by all attending chapters. During National Conclave, contests are held for chapters to participate against one another.

- Essay Contest
- Debate Contest
- Quiz Bowl Contest
- Parliamentary Procedure
- Program of Excellence

== See also ==
- Agricultural Education
- Professional fraternities and sororities
