= Gamma Epsilon Tau =

American honor fraternity for graphic arts

- ΓΕΤ
- Founded: 1953; 73 years ago New York, New York
- Type: Honor
- Affiliation: Independent
- Status: Active
- Emphasis: Graphic arts
- Scope: National (US)
- Colors: Maroon and Black
- Symbol: Type block
- Chapters: 8 active, 14 chartered
- Headquarters: c/o Department of Graphic Communications; G-01 Tillman Hall; Clemson, South Carolina 29634-1353; United States

Gamma Epsilon Tau (ΓΕΤ or GET) is a co-ed American collegiate honors fraternity for graphic artists. As of 2013, the fraternity has eight active chapters. Its national chapter is located at the Rochester Institute of Technology in Rochester, New York.

== History ==
Gamma Epsilon Tau was originally formed in 1953 at an annual conference of the International Graphic Arts Education Association (IGAEA) held in New York City. Members of the printing-oriented group Xi Omicron Pi from the University of California at Santa Barbara worked with another group on the East Coast to establish the fraternity. This coincided with an increase in graphic design programs in American higher education.

The fraternity is a national co-educational honor society focused on graphic arts education. GET provides professional and social networking opportunities to undergraduates and alumni. Prospective members must meet certain academic, moral, and participatory standards to join the organization.

As of 2013, the fraternity has chartered fourteen chapters; eight are active. Its national chapter is located at the Rochester Institute of Technology in Rochester, New York.

== Symbols ==
The fraternity's colors are maroon and black. Its symbol is in the type block.

== Chapters ==
Following is a list of Gamma Epsilon Tau chapters. Active chapters are indicated in bold. Inactive chapters are in italics.

Name	Charter date and range	Institution	Location	Status	Ref.
Alpha	1953	University of California, Santa Barbara	Santa Barbara County, California	Inactive	(Note: This was a founding chapter of Gamma Epsilon Tau.) (Note: Chapter formed from Xi Omicron Pi.)
Beta	1953	Los Angeles Harbor College	Wilmington, Los Angeles, California	Inactive	
**Gamma**	1953	New York City College of Technology	Brooklyn, New York, New York	Active	
Delta	1954	Ryerson University, Toronto Municipal	Toronto, Ontario, Canada	Inactive	
**Epsilon**		Ferris State University	Big Rapids, Michigan	Active	
**Zeta**	1955	Rochester Institute of Technology	Rochester, New York	Inactive	(Note: Currently serves as the national (managing) chapter.)
Eta				Inactive	
Theta				Inactive	
**Iota**		Pittsburg State University	Pittsburg, Kansas	Active	
Kappa		Pennsylvania College of Technology	Williamsport, Pennsylvania	Inactive	
Lambda				Inactive	
**Mu**		Murray State University	Murray, Kentucky	Active	
**Nu**		Appalachian State University	Boone, North Carolina	Active	
**Xi**	2002	Clemson University	Clemson, South Carolina	Active	
Omicron	2016	Millersville University of Pennsylvania	Millersville, Pennsylvania	Active	
**Pi**		Georgia Southern University	Statesboro, Georgia	Active	
