= Arnold and Marie Schwartz College of Pharmacy =

Coordinates: 40°49′8″N 73°35′38″W

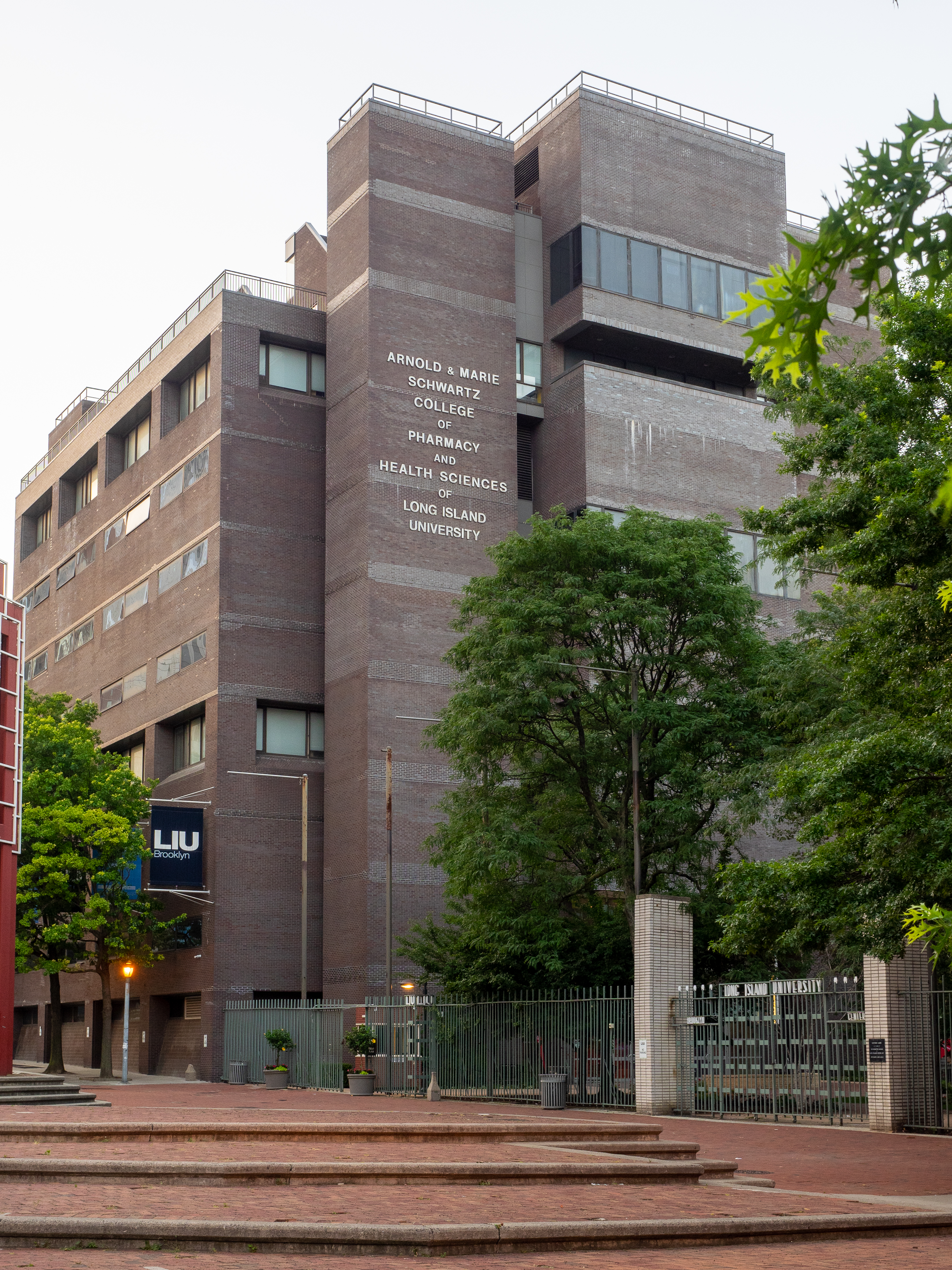
- Type: Private pharmacy school
- Established: 1886
- Parent institution: LIU Brooklyn
- Location: Brooklyn, New York, United States
- Campus: Urban; 11 acres (0.45 km²)
- Website: www.liu.edu/pharmacy

The Arnold and Marie Schwartz College of Pharmacy, formerly known as the Brooklyn College of Pharmacy, is a graduate school of the Brooklyn campus of Long Island University (LIU), a private university with two campuses in New York. The pharmacy school was founded in 1886 and is one of the oldest in the United States. It became affiliated with LIU in 1929 and was fully merged into LIU in 1976 when the college was renamed for its Schwartz benefactors.

== History ==
A fundraising campaign was begun in 1889 so the school could be recognized as a degree-granting institution. The first formal course of instruction began on October 5, 1891. At first, it was a one-year certificate program but, with recognition, it became a two-year Pharmacy Graduate degree.

Students attended lectures in a two-room apartment at 399 Classon Avenue. The kitchen was a laboratory and the parlor was the lecture hall. Among the members of the first class was William D. Anderson, who became the third and longest-serving dean of the college. As enrollment grew, the college moved to larger buildings in 1895 and 1903.

In 1929, the college moved to 600 Lafayette Avenue, which included a gymnasium where the school's intercollegiate basketball team played. The current campus at LIU's University Plaza was funded by Arnold and Marie Schwartz in 1976.

According to the Alumni Association on the college's 125th anniversary in 2011: "To date nearly 25,000 young men and women, the majority of whom are from New York City, have been educated by the College to enter pharmacy practice."

=== Deans ===
The following deans have led the college since its accreditation:

1. Robert G. Eccles (1891–1892)
2. Elias H. Bartley (1892–1902)
3. William D. Anderson (1902–1937)
4. Hugo H. Schaefer (1937–1956)
5. Arthur G. Zupko (1956–1976)
6. John J. Sciarra (1976–1985)
7. Stephen M. Gross (1985–2008)
8. David R. Taft (2008–2015)
9. John M. Pezzuto (2015–2020)
10. Arash Dabestani (2020– )

=== Historical locations ===
- 1891: 399 Classon Avenue, Brooklyn, NY
- 1895: 329 Franklin Avenue, Brooklyn, NY
- 1903: 265–271 Nostrand Avenue, Brooklyn, NY
- 1929: 600 Lafayette Avenue, Brooklyn, NY
- 1976: LIU, University Plaza, (Dekalb Avenue and Flatbush Avenue), Brooklyn, NY

== Academics ==
As of 2023, the college offered three degrees: Pharm.D., Ph.D., and M.S.

== Notable alumni ==
- Christian (Gunnvald Kristian) Faaland, Norwegian-American WWI 106th Infantry Regiment Soldier and Prisoner of War
