= Omega Delta =

American optometry fraternity

- ΩΔ
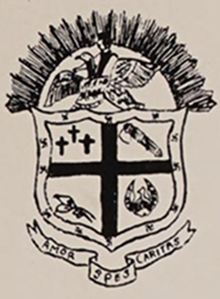
- Founded: May 21, 1917; 109 years ago Northern Illinois College of Optometry
- Type: Professional
- Affiliation: Independent
- Status: Active
- Emphasis: Optometry
- Scope: National
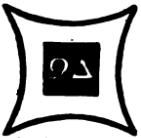
- Member badge
- Colors: Royal purple and Old gold
- Flower: White carnation
- Chapters: 2 active, 13 chartered
- Members: 4,000+ lifetime
- Headquarters: Fullerton, California; United States

Omega Delta (ΩΔ) is an American professional fraternity for students of optometry. It was established in 1917 at the Northern Illinois College of Optometry and expanded to include thirteen chapters.

== History ==
Omega Delta was formed locally on May 21, 1917 by students C. I. Josephson Jr. and L. Gessett at the Northern Illinois College of Optometry. It was originally a male-only professional optometry fraternity created to support scholarship, develop high professional and ethical standards, and create a fraternal relationship amongst its members.

Omega Delta Fraternity of Optometrists was incorporated in the state of Illinois. It expanded to be a national organization with the addition of the chapters at Needles Institute of Optometry and Los Angeles College of Optometry in 1919. It was governed by a grand chapter, with five officers who are elected at national conventions or special conclaves, including grand president and grand secretary/treasurer. In 1929, it held its fifth annual grand chapter meeting during the American Optometric Association's convention. At the time it had seven chapters.

In 1930, the fraternity started publishing its annual magazine Omega Delta News. Its activities included sponsoring educational lectures and hosting a variety of social events. For decades, the Iota chapter at the Southern College of Optometry sponsored an annual dance, Year and a Day, that honored the college's graduating seniors and commemorated the return of its students from World War II. Chapters also tutor and host mock proficiencies, helping to prepare members for professional exams.

By 1963, Omega Delta had chartered thirteen chapters and had initiated 3,975 members at optometry schools across the United States. In the 1970s, its publications include the Omega Delta Directory and the quarterly Omega Delta Newsletter. The fraternity is now coeducational. As of 2024, two chapters remain active. Its last known national headquarters was based at the Gamma chapter in Fullerton, California.

== Symbols ==
Omega Delta's key is a monogram of the Greek letters ΩΔ, with the Δ on the bottom. The fraternity's badge is square, with concave sides and the Greek letters ΩΔ in gold over black enamel. Its pledge pin is an equilateral triangle that is half purple and half gold.

The fraternity's colors are royal purple and old gold. Its flower is the white carnation.

== Chapters ==
In the following chapter list, active chapters are indicated in bold and inactive chapters and institutions are in italics. The University of Arizona has the Omega Delta Pre-Optometry Club; although its connection to the professional fraternity is unknown.

Chapter	Charter date and range	Institution	Location	Status	Ref.
Alpha	May 21, 1917 – 1955	Northern Illinois College of Optometry	Chicago, Illinois	Consolidated	(Note: Alpha and Mu consolidated to form Alpha Mu chapter when the Northern Illinois College of Optometry and the Chicago College of Optometry merged to form the Illinois College of Optometry in 1955.)
Beta	May 1, 1919 – 1926	Needles Institute of Optometry	Kansas City, Missouri	Inactive	(Note: In 1926, the Needles Institute merged with the Northern Illinois College of Optometry.)
**Gamma**	May 1, 1919	Marshall B. Ketchum University	Fullerton, California	Active	(Note: Chapter formed at the Southern California College of Optometry and Ophthalmology, which became the Los Angeles College of Optometry in 1948 and the Southern California College of Optometry in 1972. SCCO became Marshall B. Ketchum University in 2013.)
Delta	1922–1941	UC Berkeley School of Optometry	Berkeley, California	Inactive	(Note: The university's Optometry Timeline indicates that this chapter formed in 1933, but that may be the date the fraternity received university recognition or was otherwise reorganized. The chapter withdrew and became the Associated Optometry Students of the University of California.)
Epsilon	1923–xxxx ?	Pennsylvania State College of Optometry	Elkins Park, Pennsylvania	Inactive	
Zeta	February 1923–1955	North Pacific College of Optometry	Forest Grove, Oregon	Inactive	
Eta	1923–xxxx ?	University of Missouri College of Optometry	St. Louis, Missouri	Inactive	
Theta	March 5, 1926 – xxxx ?	University of Rochester	Rochester, New York	Inactive	(Note: The chapter formed from Omega Pi Tau (local), established in 1921.)
**Iota**	1937	Southern College of Optometry	Memphis, Tennessee	Active	
Kappa	1939–xxxx ?	Ohio State University	Columbus, Ohio	Inactive	
Mu	January 7, 1950 – 1955	Chicago College of Optometry	Chicago, Illinois	Consolidated	
Nu	1952–xxxx ?	Indiana University Bloomington	Bloomington, Indiana	Inactive	
Alpha Mu	1955–xxxx ?	Illinois College of Optometry	Fullerton, California	Inactive	
