= National Society of Blackjacks =

High School Junior ROTC leadership program

- Founded: September 13, 1967; 58 years ago University of Nebraska–Lincoln
- Type: Drill and service
- Affiliation: Pershing Rifles
- Status: Active
- Emphasis: Junior ROTC
- Scope: National
- Pillars: Respect, Friendship, Integrity, Leadership, Service, and Scholarship
- Colors: Yellow and Black
- Symbol: Shield, crossed sabers, and torch
- Flower: Yellow Rose
- Chapters: 8+ units
- Headquarters: 500 Westover Drive #1400; Sanford, North Carolina 27330; United States

The National Society of Blackjacks is an American high school Junior Reserve Officer Training Corps leadership program based on the example of General of the Armies John J. Pershing. The Blackjacks are the high school auxiliary of the National Society of Pershing Rifles.

== History ==
The National Society of Blackjacks was founded on September 13, 1967, by Pershing Rifles Company R-7, based at the University of Central Missouri in Warrensburg, Missouri. The date was selected because it was General John J. Pershing's birthday. John J. Pershing. The mission of the Blackjacks is to form drill units throughout the United States that are trained as future members of Pershing Rifles and to protect the ideals of Pershing, patron of the Pershing Rifles.

Pershing Rifles Company R-7 became the Blackjack National Headquarters in September 1972. William F. Kuerz became the Blackjack's National Commander.

Its headquarters moved to the MacDonald County High School in Anderson, Missouri. in 1975. The Pershing Rifles National Headquarters assumed control of Blackjacks in the fall of 1976. Pershing Rifles 4th Regimental Headquarters at Clemson University assumed control of Blackjacks National Headquarters on April 9, 1977.

In the 1980s, Blackjacks suffered a slow decline in membership until they ceased to exist. The National Society of Blackjacks was re-established in 2012 by Pershing Rifles.

== Symbols ==
The Blackjacks coat of arms was adopted in 1967 and has similarities with the Pershing Rifles Coat of Arms. It consists of a black shield decorated with a torch covered by cross sabers, with the letters "B" and "J" in gold on either side. Below the shield is a banner with the inscription "Blackjacks" and the founding date "1967." The shield shows that the Blackjacks are ready to meet any situation. The crossed sabers are also the symbol of the U.S. Cavalry. The torch symbolizes the eternal flame of friendship, scholarship, knowledge, and indomitable leadership.

The colors of the Blackjacks are yellow gold and black. Yellow is the United States Cavalry branch color and was selected to represent Pershing's service as a cavalry officer. Black represents Pershing's nickname of “Blackjack” and signifies wisdom, self-control, and discipline. Its flower is the Yellow Rose, similarly selected to represent Pershing's carvary service. Yellow rose also traditionally represent friendship.

In 1967, the Blackjacks adopted a membership ribbon that was based on that of the Pershing Rifles. It was worn on the left breast of the member's uniform and "denotes exemplary conduct at all times". The ribbon includes six yellow stripes, representing Respect, Friendship, Integrity, Leadership, Service, and Scholarship. Blackjacks also wear a yellow and black Fourragère or shoulder cord on the left shoulder as a symbol of honor.

== Units ==
Following is a list of Blackjack units. Blackjacks units use a similar Company-Regimental Designation to that of the National Society of Pershing Rifles. Active units are indicated in bold. Inactive units and institutions are in italics.

Company	Charter date and range	Institution	Location	Status	Ref.
A-1	19xx ?–19xx ?	Boy Scouts of America/Venture Crew Six	Tremont City, Ohio	Inactive	
A-2	19xx ?–19xx ?	Heelan High School	Sioux City, Iowa	Inactive	
A-4	19xx ?–19xx ?	Carol Hayes High School	Birmingham, Alabama	Inactive	(Note: Unit was sponsored by Pershing Rifles Company G-4 at Auburn University.)
A-6	19xx ?–19xx ?	Baker High School	Mobile, Alabama	Inactive	(Note: Unit was sponsored by Pershing Rifles Company S-16 at Stetson University.)
A-7	19xx ?–19xx ?	William Christman High School	Independence, Missouri	Inactive	
A-9	19xx ?–19xx ?	South High School	Denver, Colorado	Inactive	(Note: Unit was sponsored by the Pershing Rifles 9th Regimental Headquarters at the University of Denver.)
B-1	19xx ?–19xx ?	Wooster High School	Wooster Ohio	Inactive	(Note: Unit was sponsored by Pershing Rifles Company D-1 at the University of Akron.)
B-2	19xx ?–19xx ?	Cretin High School	Saint Paul, Minnesota	Inactive	(Note: Unit was sponsored by the Pershing Rifles Company E-2 at the University of Minnesota.)
B-6	19xx ?–19xx ?	Satsuma High School	Satsuma, Alabama	Inactive	
B-9	19xx ?–19xx ?	Logan Senior High School	Logan, Utah	Inactive	
C-1	19xx ?–19xx ?	Grove City High School	Grove City, Ohio	Inactive	(Note: Unit was sponsored by the Pershing Rifles Company A-1 at Ohio State University.)
C-8	19xx ?–19xx ?	Westbury Navy JROTC	Westbury, New York	Inactive	
D-17	19xx ?–19xx ?	S. H. Rider High School	Wichita Falls, Texas	Inactive	(Note: Unit was sponsored by the Pershing Rifles Company T-17 at Texas Tech University.)
E-4	19xx ?–19xx ?	Beaver Creek High School	West Jefferson, North Carolina	Inactive	(Note: Unit was sponsored by Pershing Rifles Company L-4 at North Carolina State University.)
T-8	19xx ?–19xx ?	American Military Academy	Guaynabo, Puerto Rico	Inactive	
**A-4**	20xx ?	Camden Military Academy	Camden, South Carolina	Active	
**A-8**	20xx ?	Southold Navy JROTC Units (Southold High School, Mattituck High School, and Greenport High School)	Southold, New York	Active	
**B-4**	20xx ?	Paul R. Brown Leadership Academy	Elizabethtown, North Carolina	Active	
**B-8**	20xx ?	Brentwood Air Force JROTC	Brentwood, New York	Active	
**D-8**	20xx ?	Riverhead Navy JROTC	Riverhead, New York	Active	
**F-8**	20xx ?	William Floyd High School Navy JROTC	Mastic Beach, New York	Active	
**D-17**	20xx ?	Liberty Magnet High School Army JROTC	Baton Rouge, Louisiana	Active	
