= Pershing Angels =

Military-based drill sorority for women

- Founded: February 9, 1965; 60 years ago Morgan State University, Baltimore, Maryland
- Type: Student society
- Affiliation: Independent
- Status: Active
- Emphasis: Military
- Scope: National (US)
- Colors: Royal Blue White
- Symbol: Dove
- Flower: White Rose
- Chapters: 12 (active)
- Headquarters: 2885 Sanford Avenue SW #21820; Grandville, Michigan 49418; United States
- Website: Pershing Angels National Headquarters

The National Society Pershing Angels is a military-based drill sorority for women founded in 1965 as a Coed Affiliate drill unit of Pershing Rifles at Morgan State University. It is the oldest continuously operating U.S. national women's college organization dedicated to drill.

== History ==
In 1962, thirty ladies at Morgan State College in Baltimore, Maryland started a society that would become Pershing Angels. Its mission is to foster a spirit of friendship and cooperation among the women in the military department and to maintain a highly efficient drill company. On February 9, 1965, the National Society of Pershing Angels were formally recognized as a university organization and as a sister unit to Pershing Rifles Company J-8 (then H-15) at Morgan.

Across the nation, other women's affiliates of Pershing Rifles formed during the early 1960’s. Pershing Angels was one of many similar coed affiliates with the same ideals and drill activities recognized by local Pershing Rifles Companies, but not officially sanctioned by Pershing Rifles National Headquarters.

Pershing Angles became part of the Coed Affiliates Pershing Rifles (CAPERS) in 1966 when CAPERS were formed as the first officially recognized nationwide female auxiliary to the National Society of Pershing Rifles. Pershing Rifles began accepting women as members as early as 1971, but CAPERS continued on until the mid-1980s. Once CAPERS were disbanded, Pershing Angels units formerly affiliated with CAPERS chose to continue on as a separate organization.

Over the years, Pershing Angels have expanded to other Universities which included Company C-16, Florida A&M University, Company C-15, Norfolk State College (presently Co. R-4-5, Norfolk State University), Hampton (Institute) University, and Howard University.

== Symbols ==
Pershing Angels official colors are royal blue and white. Its mascot is the dove. It flower is the white rose. Its mott is "Drill, Service, Social".

== Chapters ==
=== Collegiate ===
Following is a list of the Pershing Angels units or chapters. Active chapters are indicated in bold. Inactive chapters and institutions are in italics.

Unit	Charter date and range	Institution	Location	Status	Ref.
**U-8-5**	2018	Coppin State University	Baltimore, Maryland	Active	
**H-4-5**		Alabama A&M University	Normal, Alabama	Active	
**N-4**		North Carolina A&T State University	Greensboro, North Carolina	Active	
**O-4**		Virginia State University	Ettrick, Virginia	Active	
**P-4-5**		Tuskegee University	Tuskegee, Alabama	Active	
**R-4-5 -**		Norfolk State University	Norfolk, Virginia	Active	
**U-4-5**		Hampton University	Hampton, Virginia	Active	
**A-7-5**	2008	Lincoln University	Jefferson City, Missouri	Active	
**G-8-5**	1965	Howard University	Washington, D.C.	Active	
**J-8-5**		Morgan State University	Baltimore, Maryland	Active	
**A-16-5**		Fort Valley State University	Fort Valley, Georgia	Active	
**C-16**		Florida A&M University	Tallahassee, Florida	Active	
T-1		Central State University	Wilberforce, Ohio	Inactive	
A-4		St. Augustine's University	Raleigh, North Carolina	Inactive	
K-4-5		South Carolina State University	Orangeburg, South Carolina	Inactive	
O-4-5		Saint Paul’s College	Lawrenceville, Virginia	Inactive	
N-8		Saint Peter's College	Jersey City, New Jersey	Inactive	

=== Alumnae ===
Following is a list of the Pershing Angels alumnae units or chapters. Active chapters are indicated in bold. Inactive chapters and institutions are in italics.

Unit	Charter date and range	Location	Status	Ref.
**AA-10-5**		Hawaii Area Alumnae	Active	
**AA-4-5**		Central Virginia Alumnae	Active	
**AA-8-5**		Maryland Alumnae	Active	
**AA-16-5**		Seven Hills (Atlanta) Alumnae	Active	
**AB-4-5**		North Carolina A&T State University Alumnae	Active	
AB-8-5		Howard University Alumnae	Inactive	
**AC-4-5**		Alabama Alumnae	Active	
**AC-8-5**		DMV Area Alumnae	Active	
**AC-8-5**		Norfolk State University Alumnae	Active	

== See also ==
- Coed Affiliates Pershing Rifles
- Professional fraternities and sororities
