= Thomas Ridge =

Thomas Ridge may refer to:

- Tom Ridge (born 1945), American politician and author
- Thomas Ridge (cricketer) (1737–1801), English cricketer
- Thomas L. Ridge (1915–1999), United States Marine Corps officer
- Thomas Ridge (MP) (1670s–1730), British brewer, merchant and politician
