= Coed Affiliates Pershing Rifles =

American collegiate drilling sorority

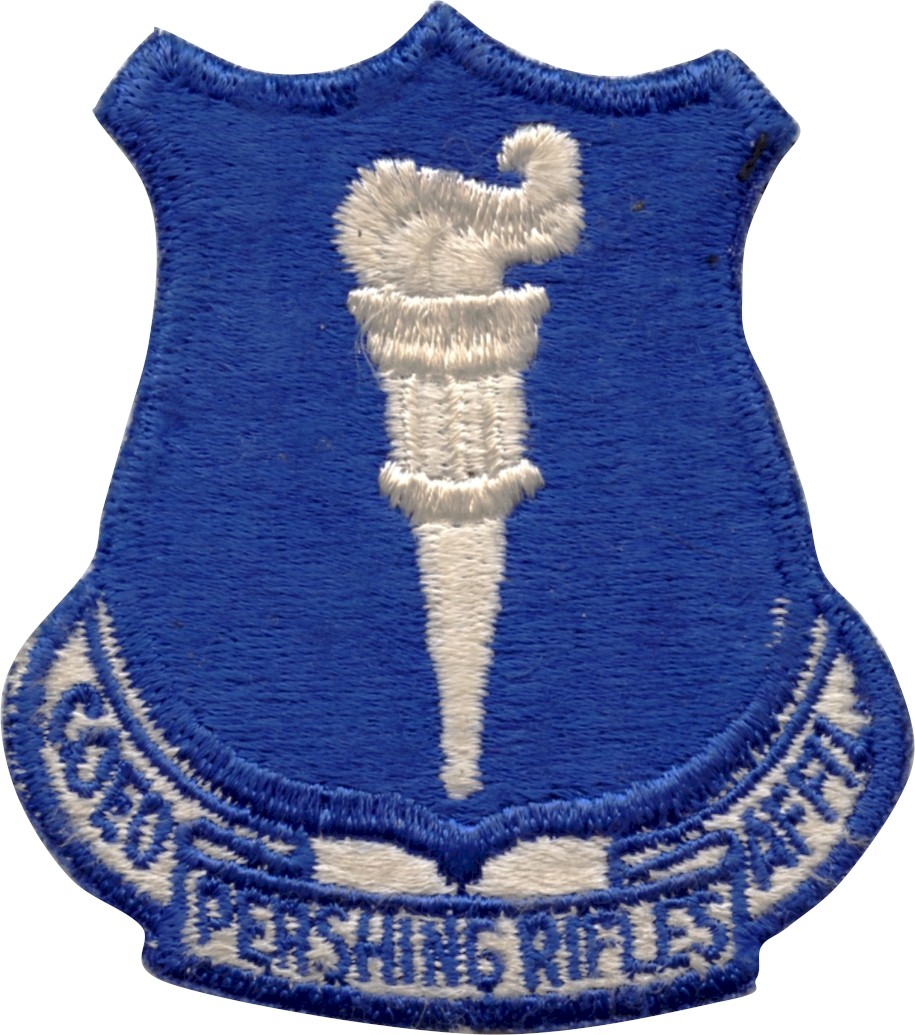
- Founded: January 1, 1966; 60 years ago University of Oklahoma
- Type: Student society
- Affiliation: Independent
- Status: Defunct
- Defunct date: 1981
- Emphasis: Military Drill
- Scope: National
- Colors: Blue and White
- Flower: White Rose
- Chapters: 68
- Nickname: CAPERS
- Headquarters: United States

The Coed Affiliates Pershing Rifles (CAPER) was established in 1962 as the first officially recognized female auxiliary to the National Society of Pershing Rifles. It was disbanded in the early 1980s when women were fully integrated into Pershing Rifles. The organization has also been called the Coed Affiliates of Pershing Rifles and CAPERS over the years.

== Mission ==
Like Pershing Rifles, the Coed Affiliates Pershing Rifles (CAPER) was focused on drill and ceremony and CAPER teams competed in local and national drill meets.

== History ==
Over the years, various women's auxiliaries to Pershing Rifles were formed at the local level. One of the earliest coed groups known to be associated with Pershing Rifles was the Cadence Countesses established at the University of Nebraska in 1959.

In 1963, women at the University of Oklahoma asked to start a female drill group affiliated with Pershing Rifles Company H-7. This led to the formation of the Kaydettes drill team. By the fall of 1965, the Kaydettes members thought that there should be a national-level organization for coed groups affiliated with Pershing Rifles. They petitioned the National Headquarters of Pershing Rifles in Lincoln, Nebraska, and were permitted to establish such an organization. They then contacted existing coed groups across the country to start the foundation for a nationwide organization.

On January 1, 1966, the Kaydettes were established as the national female auxiliary for Pershing Rifles under the supervision of the Seventh Regimental Headquarters. However, the Kaydettes' name was not acceptable because it would cause already established coed groups to change the unique names of their local units. So on November 26, 1966, at the Pershing Rifles Fall Little National Convention the organization's name was changed to the Coed Affiliates Pershing Rifles (CAPER) and came under the direct supervision of Pershing Rifles National Headquarters.

The first CAPER National Convention was held in Washington DC in the spring of 1967 in conjunction with the Pershing Rifles National Convention and Drill Meet. Five CAPER Companies were present, as well as observers from universities considering charting with CAPER. By the end of the 1967 school year, seven companies had been chartered with CAPER. By 1968 the number of chartered companies had doubled to 14.

In 1969, several CAPER Regiments were established and they aligned with existing Pershing Rifles Regiments which provided some oversight. The establishment of CAPER Regiments allowed for more concentration on unit expansion and better support to local CAPER Companies. That same year, Colonel Iris Rodriguez was promoted to CAPER Brigadier General to elevate her to a rank above that of the regimental commanders.

On February 5, 1972, CAPER Headquarters moved to the Kansas State University. At this time the National Staff consisted of 17 officers who had oversight for 4 Regiments and 35 Companies. At the 1973 National Convention CAPER held a separate drill meet for the first time.

Around 1976 CAPER National Headquarters moved to Auburn University, In 1978 it moved to Appalachian State University, and in 1979 when it again moved to Seton Hall University.

The U.S. Armed Force's move towards fully integrating women signaled the beginning of the end of the CAPER organization. By the mid-1970s, female students were able to take Reserve Officers Training Corps (ROTC) classes at their universities and soon were able to join Pershing Rifles. Around that same time Pershing Rifles units started allowing non-ROTC cadets to join. Eventually Pershing Rifles Companies integrated CAPER members into their organization. Although the exact date is unknown the CAPER was disbanded in the early 1980s.

Some CAPER Companies chose not to join Pershing Rifles and established a new national organization called Pershing Angels that still exists today.

== Chapters ==
CAPER companies or chapters were predominantly on the East Coast and in the South. Many CAPER companies shared the same numbering as their affiliated Pershing Rifles Company. The units were divided into regiments in 1970.

Following is a list of known Coed Affiliates Pershing Rifles companies and other female auxiliaries to Pershing Rifles.

Company	Regiment	Charter date and range	Institution	Location	Nickname	Status	Ref.
A-1		January 1965	Ohio State University	Columbus, Ohio		Inactive	(Note: This group was originally called the Coed Cadet Drill Team.)
A-5	5th	1966–1977	Penn State Altoona	Altoona, Pennsylvania		Inactive	
B-4	4th	1966 ?	Tennessee Tech	Crossville, Tennessee		Inactive	(Note: The chapter formed from an early group called Golden Nuggets. Although it started using the name CAPER once that group was officially established, it may have only existed as a colony as it charter date has yet to be confirmed.)
B-9	9th	1966	University of Colorado	Boulder, Colorado		Inactive	
C-15	4th	1966–1981	Norfolk State University	Norfolk, Virginia		Withdrew	(Note: This company because Pershing Angels Company R-4-5.)
E-2		1966	University of Minnesota	Minneapolis, Minnesota		Inactive	(Note: Company was affiliated with 2nd Regiment Pershing Rifles.)
N-4	4th	1966–1981	North Carolina A&T State University	Greensboro, North Carolina		Withdrew	(Note: This company became the Pershing Angels Company N-4.)
O-5		1966	Penn State Ogontz	Abington, Pennsylvania	Kaydettes	Inactive	
T-1	1st	1966–1970	Central State College	Wilberforce, Ohio		Inactive	(Note: The company formed from Pershing Angels Company T-1.)
C-10		1967	New Mexico State University	Las Cruces, New Mexico	Kaydettes	Inactive	(Note: Company was affiliated with the 10th Regiment Pershing Rifles)
D-4	4th	1967	Wake Forest University	Winston-Salem, North Carolina		Inactive	
D-6		1967–1970	Louisiana State University	Baton Rouge, Louisiana		Inactive	(Note: Company was affiliated with 6th Regiment Pershing Rifles.)
F-1	1st	1967	Ohio University	Athens, Ohio		Inactive	
M-16		1967	Florida State University	Tallahassee, Florida	Les Bleus Berets	Inactive	(Note: Company was affiliated with 16th Regiment Pershing Rifles.)
P-4	4th	1967–1981	Tuskegee University	Tuskegee, Alabama		Withdrew	(Note: This company became the Pershing Angels Company P-4-5.)
A-3		1968	Indiana University	Bloomington, Indiana	Crimson Cadettes	Inactive	(Note: Company was affiliated with 3rd Regiment Pershing Rifles.)
C-4	4th	1968	Clemson University	Clemson, South Carolina		Inactive	(Note: This company was also the 4th Regimental Headquarters.)
C-16		May 8, 1968 – 1981	Florida A & M University	Tallahassee, Florida		Withdrew	(Note: This chapter became the Pershing Angels Company C-16.)
D-15	4th	1968–1981	Hampton University	Hampton, Virginia		Withdrew	(Note: This company became the Pershing Angels Company U-4-5.)
H-1	1st	1968	West Virginia State University	Institute, West Virginia	Kaydettes	Inactive	
K-5	5th	1968	University of Pittsburgh	Pittsburgh, Pennsylvania		Inactive	
L-17		1968	Hardin-Simmons University	Abilene, Texas		Inactive	(Note: Company was affiliated with 17th Regiment Pershing Rifles.)
N-1	1st	1968	Marshall University	Huntington, West Virginia		Inactive	(Note: This company was also the 1st Regimental Headquarters.)
Q-15		1968	Pennsylvania Military College	Chester, Pennsylvania		Inactive	
B-5	5th	1969	Pennsylvania State University	University Park, Pennsylvania		Inactive	(Note: This company was also the 5th Regimental Headquarters.)
G-4	4th	1969	Auburn University	Auburn, Georgia		Inactive	
I-6		1969	Loyola University	New Orleans, Louisiana		Inactive	
L-4	4th	1969	North Carolina State University	Raleigh, North Carolina		Inactive	
P-1		1969	Youngstown State University	Youngstown, Ohio		Inactive	
Q-8		1969	Hofstra University	Hempstead, New York		Inactive	(Note: Company was affiliated with the 8th Regiment of Pershing Rifles.)
Q-17		1969	Prairie View A&M University	Prairie View, Texas	Drillets	Inactive	
H-15		1970–1981	Morgan State University	Baltimore, Maryland		Withdrew	(Note: Company formed from the National Society of Pershing Angels, a sister unit to the Pershing Rifles, that was established on February 9, 1965.This company became the Pershing Angels Company J-8 when CAPERS went dormant.)
K-4	4th	1970–1981	South Carolina State University	Orangeburg, South Carolina		Withdrew	(Note: This company became the Pershing Angels Company K-4.)
K-8		1970	Seton Hall University	South Orange, New Jersey		Inactive	
R-17		c. 1970	Trinity University	San Antonio, Texas		Inactive	(Note: This group existed as a colony in December 1969. It is assumed to have been chartered the next year.)
C-7		c. 1974	Oklahoma State University	Stillwater, Oklahoma		Inactive	
E-7		c. 1974	University of Kansas	Lawrence, Kansas	E-Co Berets	Inactive	(Note: This company was affiliated with 7th Regiment Pershing Rifles Company E-7.)
O-4	4th	1974–1981	Virginia State University	Petersburg, Virginia		Withdrew	(Note: This company became Pershing Angels Company O-4.)
T-8		c. 1974	University of Puerto Rico	San Juan, Puerto Rico		Inactive	
G-7		1970s	Kansas State University	Manhattan, Kansas		Inactive	(Note: Company was affiliated with 7th Regiment Pershing Rifles.)
M-4	4th	1970s	Appalachian State University	Boone, North Carolina		Inactive	
N-8		1970s–1981	St. Peters College	Jersey City, New Jersey		Withdrew	(Note: Company became the Pershing Angels Company N-8)
B-1		1977	University of Dayton	Dayton, Ohio		Inactive	
G-2		1977	Iowa State University	Ames, Iowa		Inactive	
H-4		1977–1981	Alabama A&M University	Normal, Alabama		Withdrew	(Note: This company became Pershing Angels Company H-4-5.)
R-8		1977	St. John's University	Jamaica, New York		Inactive	
C-1	1st		University of Kentucky	Lexington, Kentucky	Kentucky Babes	Inactive	(Note: This company was affiliated with Pershing Rifles Company C-1.)
I-1			Bowling Green State University	Bowling Green, Ohio	The Royal Green	Inactive	
A-2			University of Nebraska–Lincoln	Lincoln, Nebraska	Cadence Countesses	Inactive	(Note: This company was affiliated with 2nd Regiment Pershing Rifles Company A-2.)
H-2			Saint John's University	Collegeville, Minnesota	Petticoat Platoon	Inactive	(Note: This unit was affiliated with 2nd Regiment Pershing Rifles Company H-2.)
I-2			Marquette University	Milwaukee, Wisconsin	Marcadettes	Inactive	
K-2			South Dakota State College	Brookings, South Dakota	Pershingettes	Inactive	(Note: This company was affiliated with 2nd Regiment Pershing Rifles Company K-2)
V-2			Spring Hill College	Mobile, Alabama	Kadettes	Inactive	
B-2			Western Kentucky State College	Bowling Green, Kentucky	Rebelettes	Inactive	
J-4			Florence State University	Florence, Alabama		Inactive	(Note: This company formed as a colony and may not have been chartered.)
Q-4			University of Georgia	Athens, Georgia		Inactive	
V-6			University of South Alabama	Mobile, Alabama	Kadettes	Inactive	
G-10			University of California at Los Angeles	Los Angeles, California	Saber	Inactive	
F-12			University of Connecticut	Storrs, Connecticut		Inactive	(Note: Company was affiliated with 12th Regiment Pershing Rifles.)
M-12			University of Maine	Orono, Maine	Pershingettes	Inactive	
A-15			University of Maryland	College Park, Maryland	Kaydettes	Inactive	
S-16			Stetson University	DeLand, Florida		Inactive	
F-12			University of Connecticut	Storrs, Connecticut		Withdrew	(Note: This company merged into its affiliated Pershing Rifles Company.)
H-17			University of Texas at El Paso	El Paso, Texas		Inactive	(Note: This company was previously known as the ROTC Sponsor Corp.)
V-4	4th		Vanderbilt University	Nashville, Tennessee	Kaydettes	Inactive	(Note: This was a coed group at the University of South Alabama, "Kaydettes", affiliated with Pershing Rifles Company V-4)
H-7			University of Oklahoma	Norman, Oklahoma	Kaydettes	Inactive	
B-16			Alcorn State University	Lorman, Mississippi		Inactive	
R-17			Trinity University	San Antonio, Texas		Inactive	

== See also ==
- Pershing Angels
- Pershing Rifles
- Professional fraternities and sororities
