= Camden Military Academy =

Location
- 520 Hwy 1 North; Camden, South Carolina 29020; United States
- Coordinates: 34°16′44″N 80°33′46″W

Information
- Founded: 1958 (68 years ago)
- Headmaster: Eric Boland
- Commandant: LTC Scott Shields, ret.
- Grades: 7–Post-grad
- Enrollment: est. 270
- Color: Camden blue and white Historical colors: Carlisle gold and black
- Mascot: Iron Spartans
- Yearbook: Excalibur
- Website: www.camdenmilitary.com

Camden Military Academy (CMA) is a private, all-male, military boarding school located in Camden, South Carolina, United States. The State of South Carolina has recognized the institution as the official state military academy of South Carolina. Camden Military Academy accepts male students in grades 7 through 12, also offering a post-graduate year.

== Academy overview ==
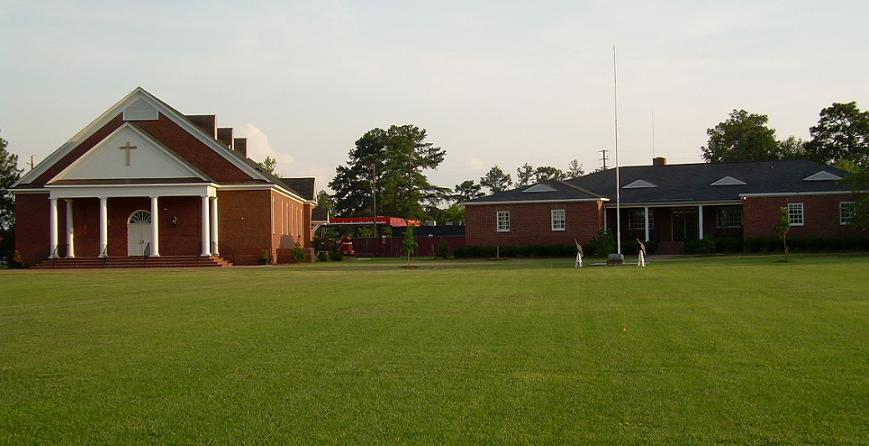
Chapel and administrative building in 2007

As of the 2025–2026 school year, Camden Military Academy has an enrollment of approximately 270 students. All students are part of the Corps of Cadets, participate in JROTC, and live on campus. 34% of cadets are students of color and 7% are also international students. The teacher-student ratio is 1:12. Classes taught at Camden are accredited by Cognia (formerly SACS). Dual-credit college courses accredited to University of South Carolina Lancaster are also offered to juniors and seniors.

Many varsity athletics are offered to cadets, such as football, soccer, cross country, basketball, baseball, tennis, golf, wrestling, and track. The academy's mascot is the Camden Spartan. Other extracurricular activities that are popular are Boy Scouts of America, Civil Air Patrol, and the Blackjacks drill team. Certain cadets are also selected to take part in Junior Leadership, a group of student leaders selected by teachers in each Kershaw County high school.

== History ==
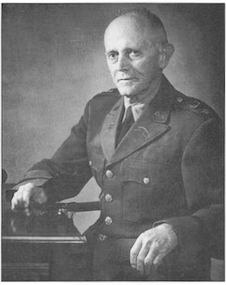
Colonel James F. Risher, President of Carlisle Military School and Camden Military Academy

Camden Military Academy traces back its tradition from three institutions: Carlisle Military School (1892–1977), Camden Academy (1950–1957), and the present-day Camden Military Academy. The current campus was also formerly occupied by the Southern Aviation School (1940–1944).

Carlisle Military School was founded in 1892 in the city of Bamberg, South Carolina as the Carlisle Fitting School of Wofford College. In 1932, Colonel James F. Risher took over the school and continued to run it as an all-male military boarding school. In 1958, his son Colonel William Risher became Headmaster at Carlisle. The school operated until 1977, closing not too long after James F. Risher's death in 1973.

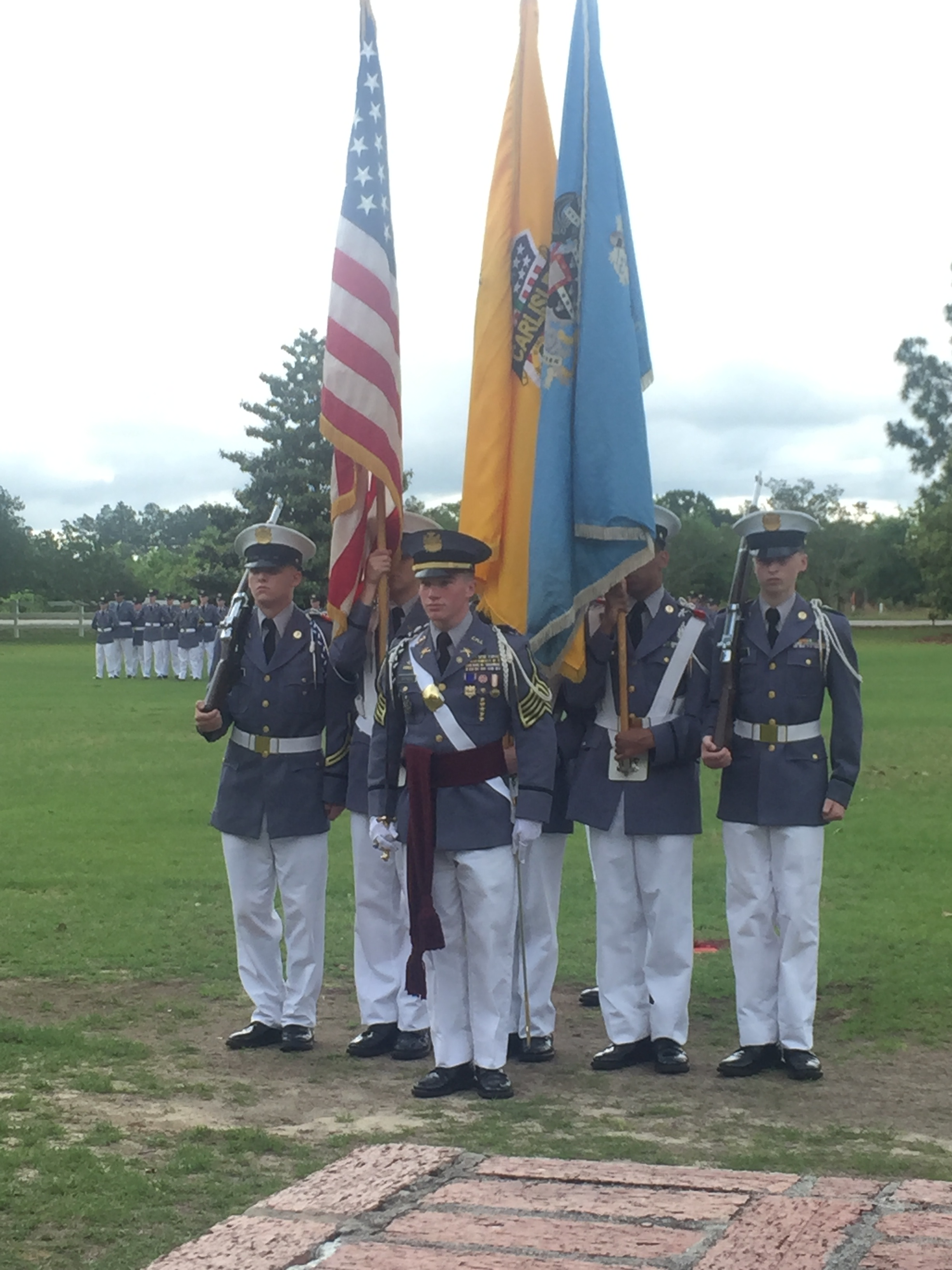
Cadets conduct a parade in 2018.

The Southern Aviation School was founded in 1940 by Woodward Field (Camden airport) to train pilots during World War II. The academy built many classrooms and barracks to house American and British pilots. Over 6,000 pilots graduated from the academy. After the academy closed in 1944, German prisoners of war were briefly kept in the barracks. The campus and airfield were then left nearly abandoned with many warplanes left behind until 1950. Some buildings built for the Southern Aviation School have been refurbished and are still in use today.

Camden Academy was founded in 1950 by the citizens of Camden as an all-male military boarding school built on the former campus of the Southern Aviation School. The school lasted until 1957. In 1958, Colonel James F. Risher, the president of Carlisle Military School, purchased Camden Academy in 1958, and the name was changed to Camden Military Academy. His son Lanning P. Risher was the school's first headmaster and served in the position for 36 years, while his other son William Risher was put in charge of Carlisle. In 1974, Lanning Risher led Camden Military Academy through a reorganization as a non-profit, tax-exempt institution.
