= Mad River Airport =

- IATA: none; ICAO: none; FAA LID: I54

Summary
- Airport type: Private
- Owner: Mad River Airpark. LLC
- Location: Tremont City, Ohio
- Elevation AMSL: 958 ft (292 m)
- Coordinates: 40.020087°N 83.830104°W

Map
- Location of airport in Ohio I54 (the United States)

Runways
Direction	Length		Surface
Direction	ft	m	Surface
09/27	3,405	1,038	Turf

Statistics
- Aircraft operations: 15,350
- Source: Federal Aviation Administration

Mad River Airport (FAA LID: I54) is a private airport located in German Township, Clark County, Ohio, United States 1 mile (1.6 km) northeast of Tremont City. It is owned and operated by the Mad River Airpark. LLC.

The Mad River Flying Association was founded in 2017 to serve the airport. The airport has a chapter of the Experimental Aircraft Association.

== Facilities and aircraft ==
Mad River Airport covers an area of 35 acres (14 ha) which contains one runway designated 09/27 with a 3,405 ft × 110 ft (1,038 m × 34 m) Turf surface.

The airport does not have a fixed-base operator, and no fuel is available.

For the 12-month period ending August 5, 2013, the airport had 15,350 aircraft operations, all are general aviation. There is no control tower in the airport.

== Accidents and incidents ==
- On July 16, 1994, a Cessna 172 was destroyed while taking off from the Mad River Airport. A witness reported the initial takeoff and climb seemed normal; the pilot departing behind the accident airplane reported it leveled off at 200' before entering a descent. The right wing subsequently dropped, and the airplane went straight down into trees. The probable cause of the accident was the pilot's failure to maintain control of the airplane.

== See also ==
- List of airports in Ohio
