= James Mukoyama =

United States Army general

James Hidefumi Mukoyama
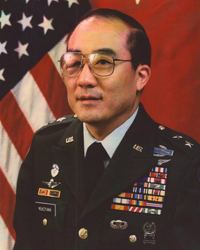
- Major General James Mukoyama
- Born: August 3, 1944 (age 82); Chicago, Illinois, U.S.
- Military career
- Allegiance: United States
- Branch: United States Army
- Rank: Major general
- Conflicts: Vietnam War; Gulf War
- Awards: Silver Star Medal; Legion of Merit; Bronze Star Medal; Purple Heart

James Hidefumi Mukoyama Jr. (Japanese: 向山 英文, born August 3, 1944) is a retired US Army Major General who at one point was the youngest American to command a United States Army division. He served over thirty years on active and reserve duty in the Army, including service in Korea and Vietnam.

== Biography ==
James Mukoyama was born on August 3, 1944, in Chicago, Illinois. His father was a Japanese immigrant and his mother was the child of immigrant parents from Japan. Mukoyama's mother's family was interned at the American internment camp Manzanar.

Mukoyama first became involved with the military when he joined the Reserve Officer's Training Corps (ROTC) program Carl Schurz High School. He later attended the University of Illinois at Navy Pier, where he earned a bachelor's degree in English. While pursuing his bachelor's degree, he continued his involvement with ROTC as well as Pershing Rifles and the Drill Team. He was commissioned as a Regular Army 2nd Lieutenant and earned a master's degree in Teaching of Social Studies. He then attended the Infantry Officers Basic Course, and earned his Jump Wings.

Mukoyama volunteered to fight in the Vietnam War, but was sent to Korea instead. After serving in Korea, he was sent to Vietnam in 1969. In 1986, he became the youngest general in the army at that time. Soon after he was promoted to major general, commanding the 70th Training Division during Desert Storm.

In 1995, Mukoyama retired from the military. His accomplishments during his retirement include helping to form the Military Outreach of Greater Chicago, serving as Chairman of the Department of Veterans Affairs Advisory Committee on Minority Veterans, and serving as chair for a committee with the National Veterans' Network to select the design for the Congressional Gold Medal award authorized by the Congressional Gold Medal for Japanese American Veterans Act.

== Honors and awards ==
- Army Distinguished Service Medal
- Silver Star
- Legion of Merit
- Bronze Star
- Purple Heart
- Meritorious Service Medal
- Air Medal
- Army Commendation Medal
- Army Achievement Medal
- National Defense Service Medal
- Armed Forces Expeditionary Medal
- Vietnam Service Medal
- Armed Forces Reserve Medal
- Badges: Combat Infantryman Badge, Expert Infantryman Badge, Parachutist Badge, Aircrewman Badge, Expert Marksmanship Badge
- Illinois Veteran of the Month, May 2013

== Publications ==
Faith, Family & Flag: Memoirs of an Unlikely American Samurai Crusader (Autobiography)
