= Carlisle Military School =

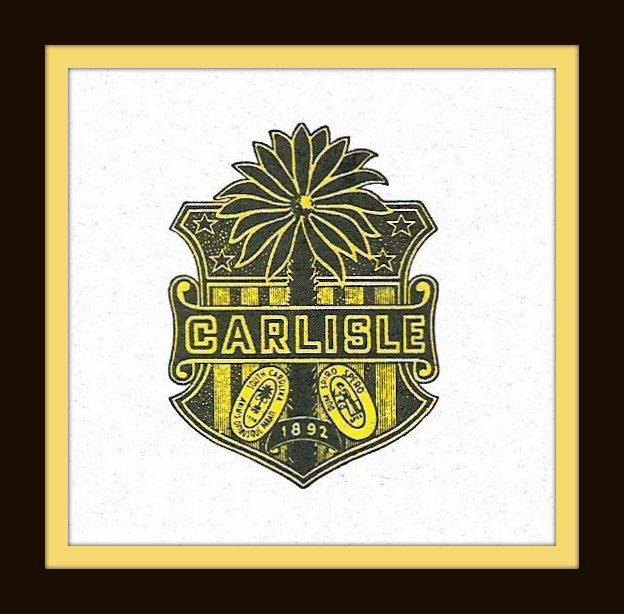
- "Develops Manly Men"

Location
- Bamberg, South Carolina; United States; 33°17′38″N 81°01′54″W

Information
- Founded: 1892
- Closed: 1977
- Colors: Gold and black
- Nickname: Golden Cyclones
- Newspaper: The Bugle
- Yearbook: Rebel (prior to 1928 "The Palmetto")

Carlisle Military School was established in 1892 at Bamberg, South Carolina, as The Carlisle Fitting School of Wofford College and closed in 1977. This school was named in honor of Dr. James H. Carlisle, who was the president of Wofford College in Spartanburg, South Carolina (1875–1902) and one of the most preeminent educators in the history of South Carolina. Dr. Carlisle stated that "The student ought to be educated not simply or chiefly because he intends to become a farmer, lawyer, or statesman, but because he is a human being - with inlets of joy, with possibilities of effort and action that no trade or calling can satisfy or exhaust".

== History ==
=== Carlisle Fitting School ===
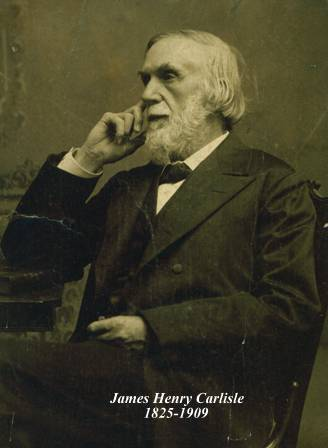
Dr. James H. Carlisle

The Carlisle Fitting School was authorized by the South Carolina Methodist Conference in 1892 as a preparatory school for Wofford College. While the decision to open a second fitting school for Wofford (The Wofford Fitting School was opened in 1887 on the Wofford campus) was strongly promoted by Wofford's financial administrator John Carlisle Kilgo (who also laid the cornerstone of Carlisle's first building), Carlisle was largely a town of Bamberg enterprise and gifts for its financial support were largely local. This was probably a chief reason why Carlisle enrolled girls as well as boys during this time. As an added benefit, the Carlisle Fitting School also prepared students for entrance into Wofford's sophomore class. But Carlisle was unfortunate in that its leadership changed so often – out of nine headmasters during its nearly forty years under the Methodist Church and Wofford College trustees, only John C. Guilds (for whom a building on the Carlisle campus was named, and who later became President of Columbia College (South Carolina)) served as headmaster longer than five years. Guilds had gone to Carlisle as a teacher after his graduation from Wofford in 1906, and he was elected headmaster in 1910. The Guilds' administration was a most successful one, as he had taken over the administration of a school which was at the point of failure with only 3 teachers and 60 students. Under his eleven years as headmaster, he left Carlisle with 10 teachers and 225 students. Also during his administration, and largely due to World War I, a Junior Reserve Officers' Training Corps (ROTC) program was formally established - setting the stage for what the future would hold for Carlisle.

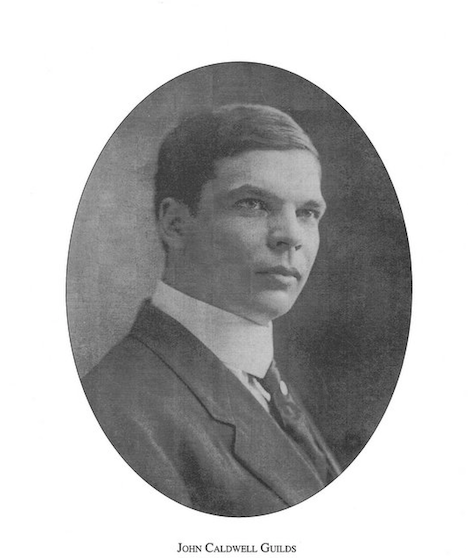
Dr. John Caldwell Guilds (1886–1965), early influential headmaster of Carlisle School (1910–1920)

However, in the next eight years there were three more headmasters: Duncan, Hagood, and Gault. And in 1928, as the need for fitting schools had passed (the Wofford Fitting School was closed in 1924), the Methodist Church decided that Carlisle would no longer be affiliated with Wofford College.

=== Carlisle School transition to Carlisle Military School ===
Along with this major shift in direction in 1928, Colonel James F. Risher (who had arrived at Carlisle in 1924, serving as a science teacher and quartermaster) was elected as headmaster. Colonel Risher would prove to be the right man at the right time in Carlisle's history. It was indeed a testament to Colonel Risher's (as well as his wife Emma's) faith in Carlisle that – even as the "Great Depression" was deepening – he leased Carlisle from the Methodist Church in 1932. Then in 1938, as the Methodist Church was considering to close Carlisle entirely, Colonel Risher offered to purchase Carlisle from the Methodist Church, even while the entire nation was still in the grips of the Great Depression. The future of Carlisle was secured when Colonel Risher's offer was accepted, and Carlisle School was thereafter known as Carlisle Military School. Colonel Risher established his vision of "developing manly men" serving as headmaster of Carlisle until 1958, when his son (William R.) was named as his successor. Another major event occurred in 1958 when Colonel Risher purchased Camden Academy (Camden, S.C.), naming another son, (Lanning P.), as the headmaster of what would henceforth be known as Camden Military Academy. Colonel Risher carried his "life's calling" forward as president of both institutions until his death in 1973.

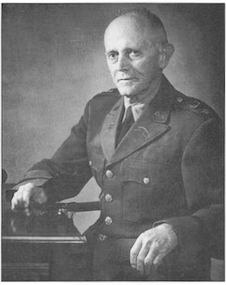
Colonel James Franklin Risher (1889-1973), Headmaster of Carlisle Military School, and later, President of Carlisle Military School and Camden Military Academy

=== Closure ===
In addition to the loss of Colonel Risher, Carlisle faced the effect of a dwindling enrollment in the post-Vietnam era of the 1970s and closed its doors at the end of the 1977 school year. Since 1979 the property has been used as a U.S. Department of Labor Job Corps Training Center, continuing its relevance as an educational institution in the Bamberg community and beyond.

=== Commemoration and reunion ===
On April 14, 2018, a commemoration of Carlisle Military School's history was held in Bamberg, SC, on its former campus (now a Federal Department of Labor Job Corps Training Center). A commemorative plaque was dedicated that will be erected as part of the City and County of Bamberg Veterans Memorial Trail. Additionally, the South Carolina House of Representatives passed a Resolution (H.5183) "To Honor The Significant History Of The Carlisle Military School In The Celebration Of The School's Rich Legacy With A Reunion On April 14, 2018".

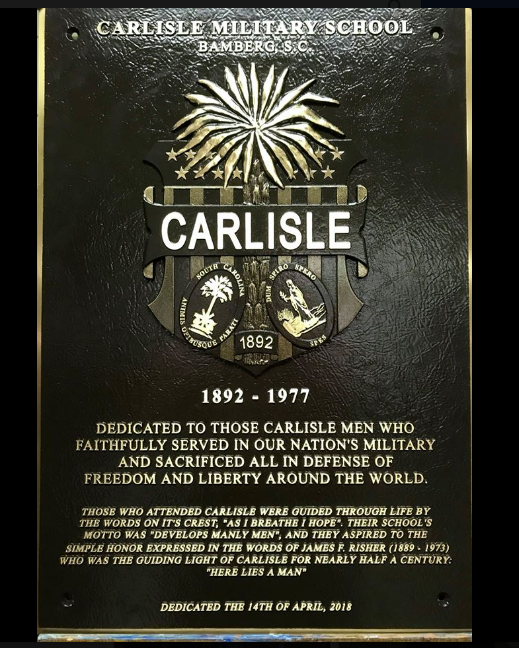
CMS Plaque

== Alumni ==
=== Notable alumni ===
- Van C. Doubleday, Major General, U.S. Air Force CMS 1947, USAF Air Traffic Control Award named for him
- Stanley Tuemler Escudero CMS 1960, U.S. Ambassador
- George B. Hartzog Jr. (1920–2008) CMS 1937, former Director of the National Park Service.
- Luther Conway Shelton III "Buddy", CMS 1961, attended the United States Air Force Academy, professional golfer/entertainer/inspirational speaker
- Hugh Armstrong Fleming, Jr CMS 1963, created the "Chick-fil-A" sauce
- Fred Zeigler CMS 1965, University of South Carolina football player, S.C. Athletic Hall of Fame

== Photo gallery ==
Carlisle groundbreaking ceremony from The State Newspaper dated September 10, 1892

The State Newspaper article dated April 24, 1893

Article published in The State Newspaper, June 11, 1893 about first Commencement of Carlisle Fitting School

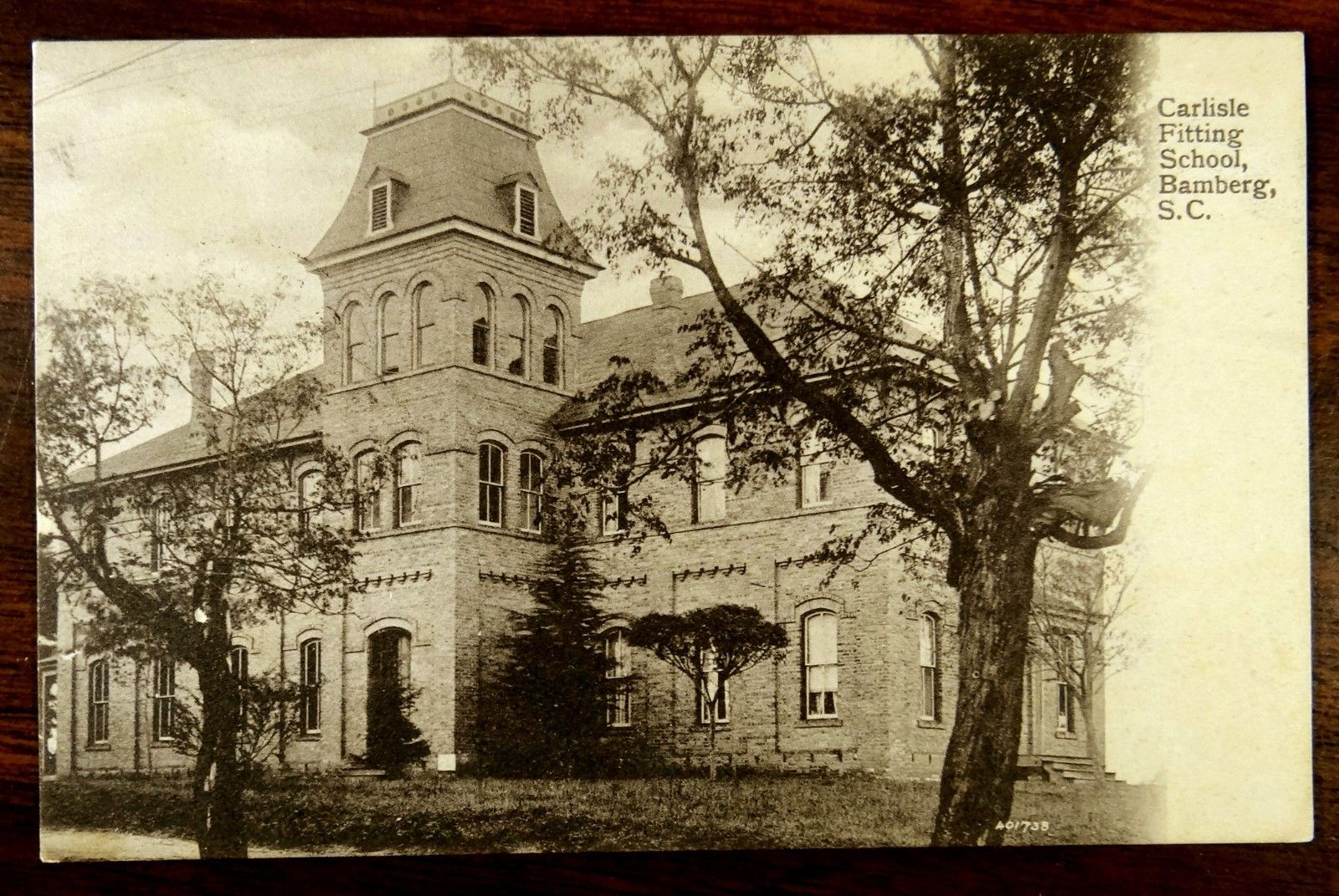
Main Building cornerstone laid in 1892. This image is from a postcard dated Sep 17, 1908

School Catalogue describing facilities and curriculum of Carlisle Fitting School (est. 1892)

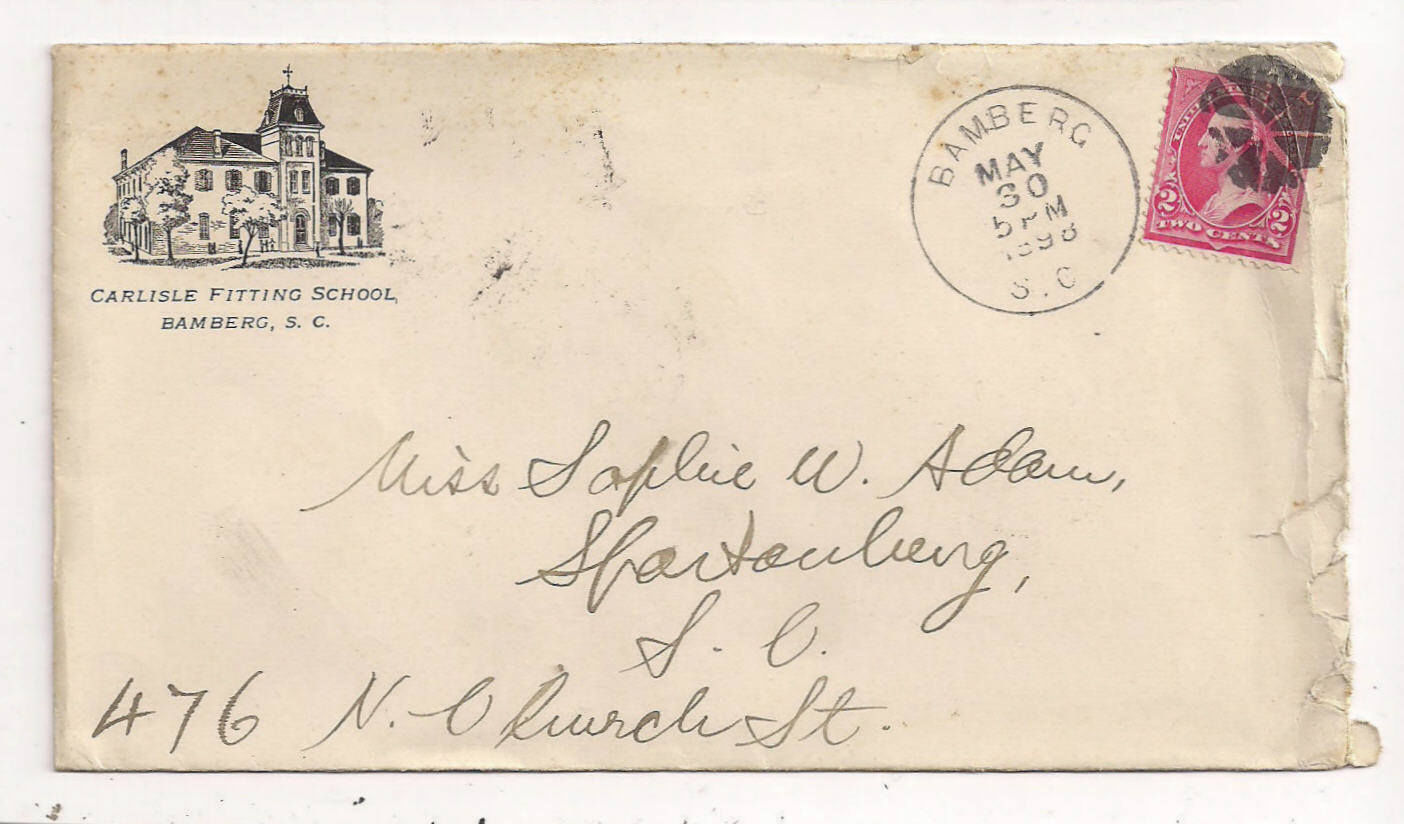
Carlisle Envelope from 1898

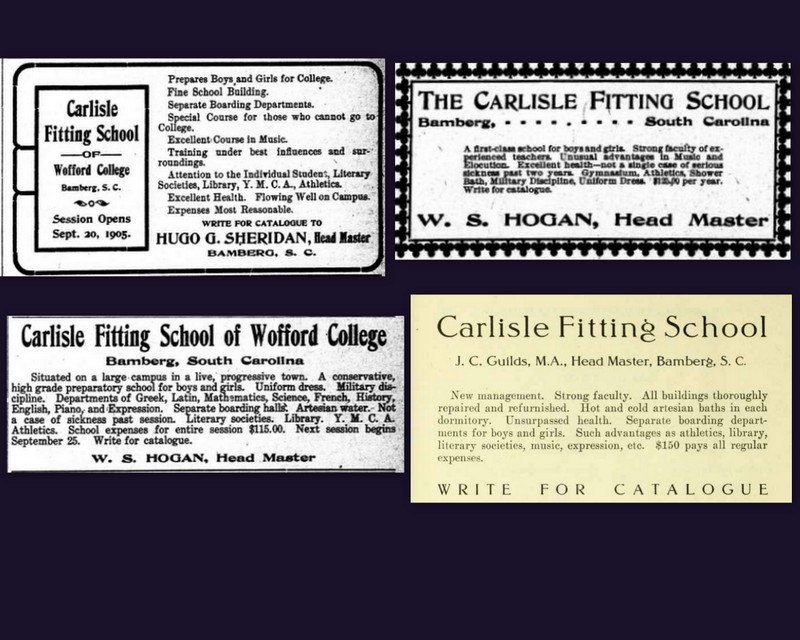
Advertisements for Carlisle Fitting School 1905 - 1910

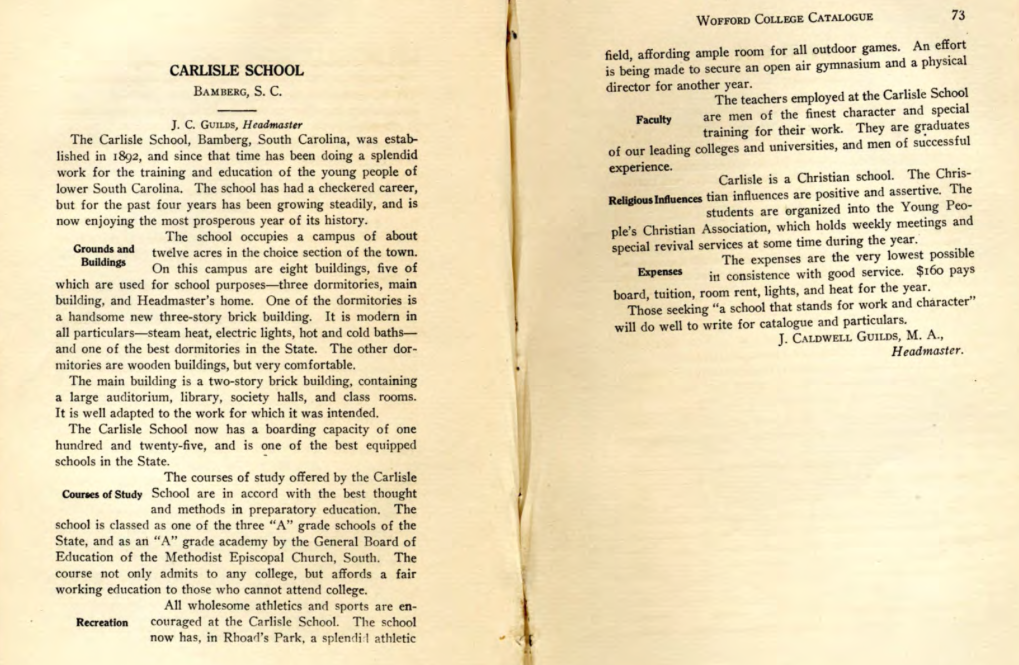
School year 1913–14 (p. 73) information for Carlisle was included inside the "Wofford College Catalogue". https://digitalcommons.wofford.edu/catalogues/37/

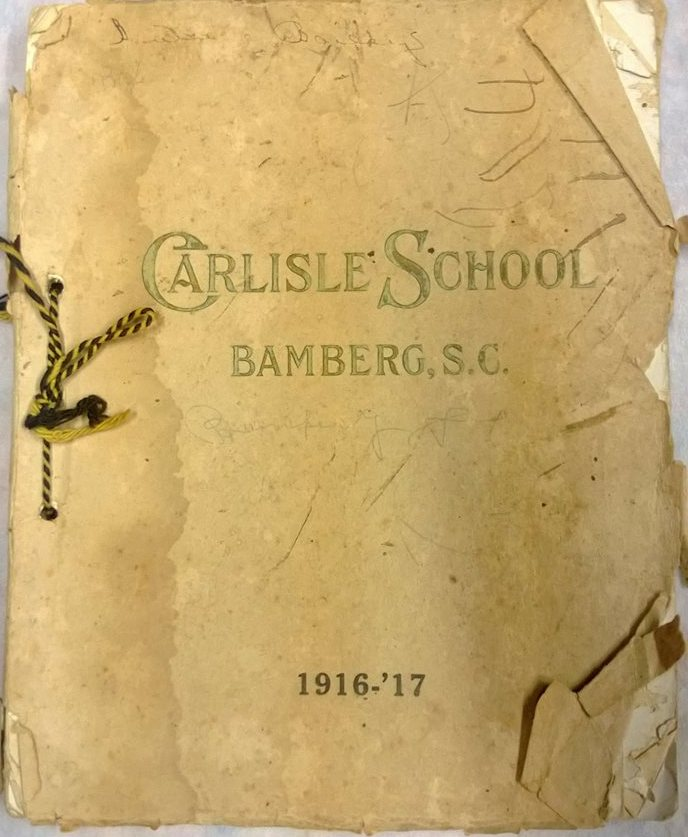
1916-17 Handbook for Carlisle Fitting School used for incoming students and recruitment of prospective students.

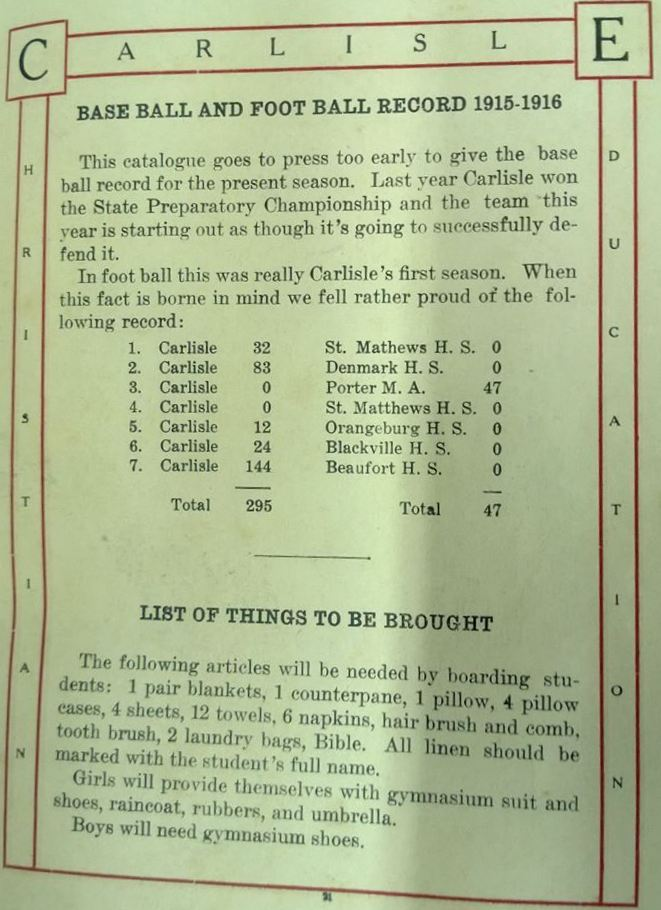
Record of CFS 1915 football team, as well as stating that its baseball team won the S.C. "State Preparatory Championship" in baseball.

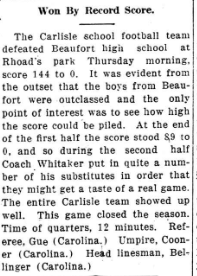
Newspaper article detailing record win by Carlisle over Beaufort High on November 26, 1915 - this game was also mentioned in the book ""High School Football In South Carolina: Palmetto Pigskin History", pg.2

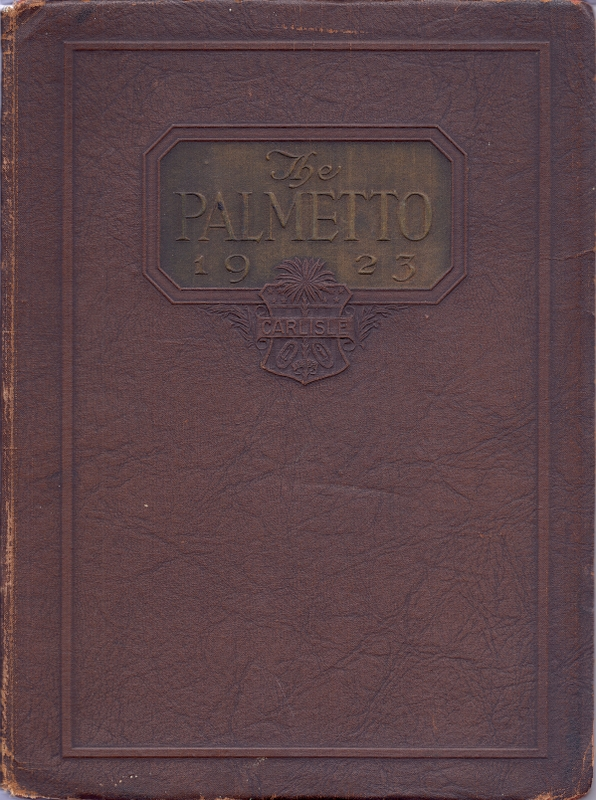
1923 "Palmetto"

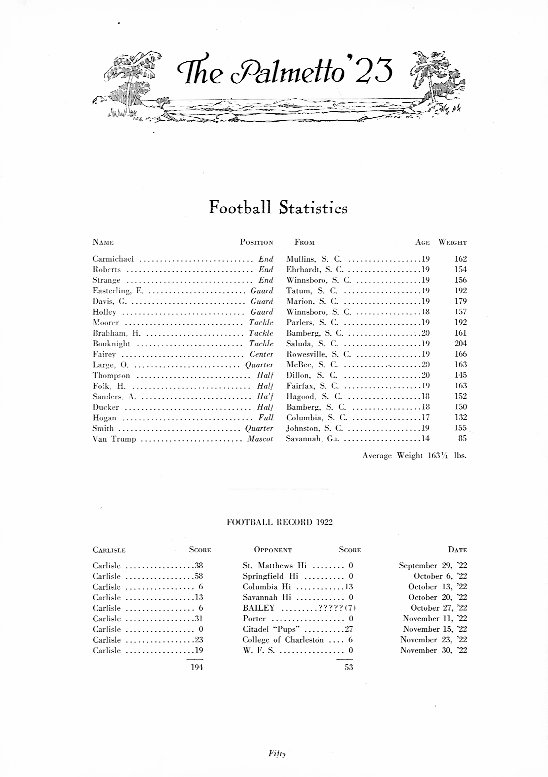
Carlisle Football Record from 1922 (1923 "Palmetto").

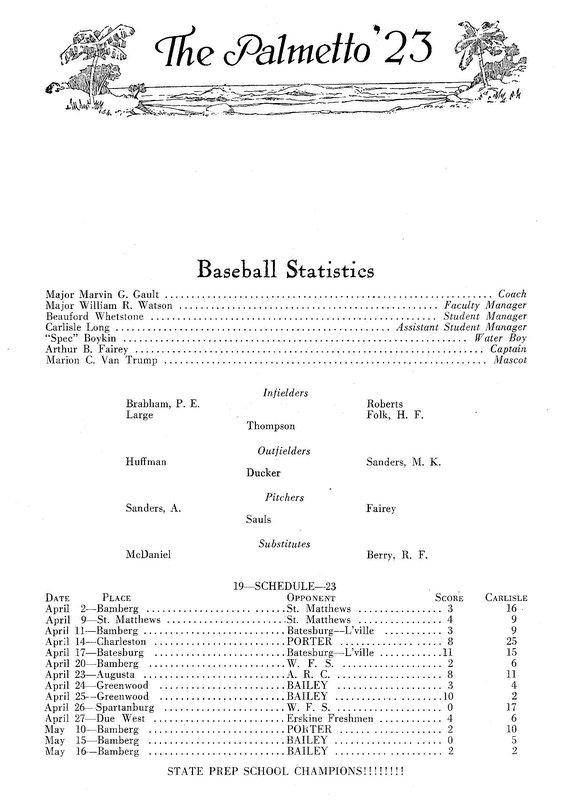
Schedule and results of Carlisle baseball team in 1923 "Palmetto" - which won the S.C. State prep title (as well as in 1921 and 1926).

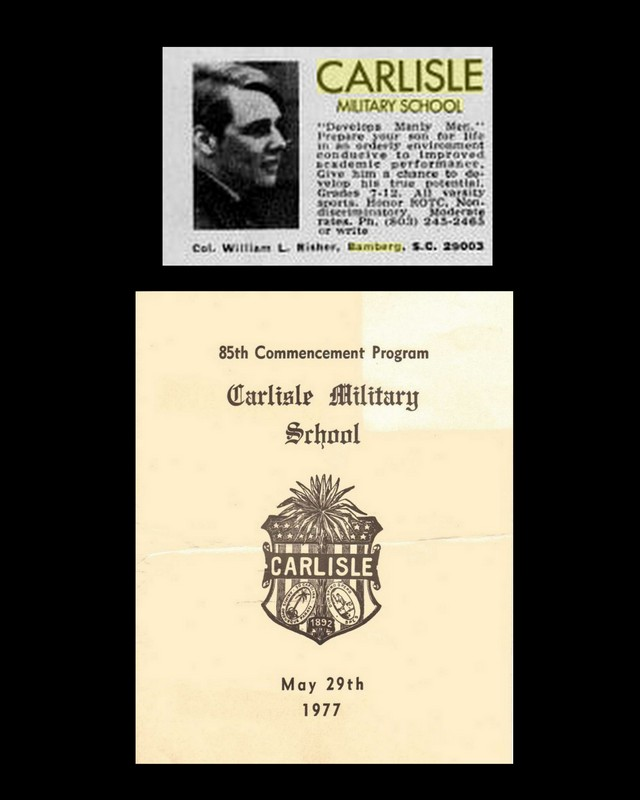
1977 - last advertisement and last graduating class commencement program.
