= Tremont City, Ohio =

- Village
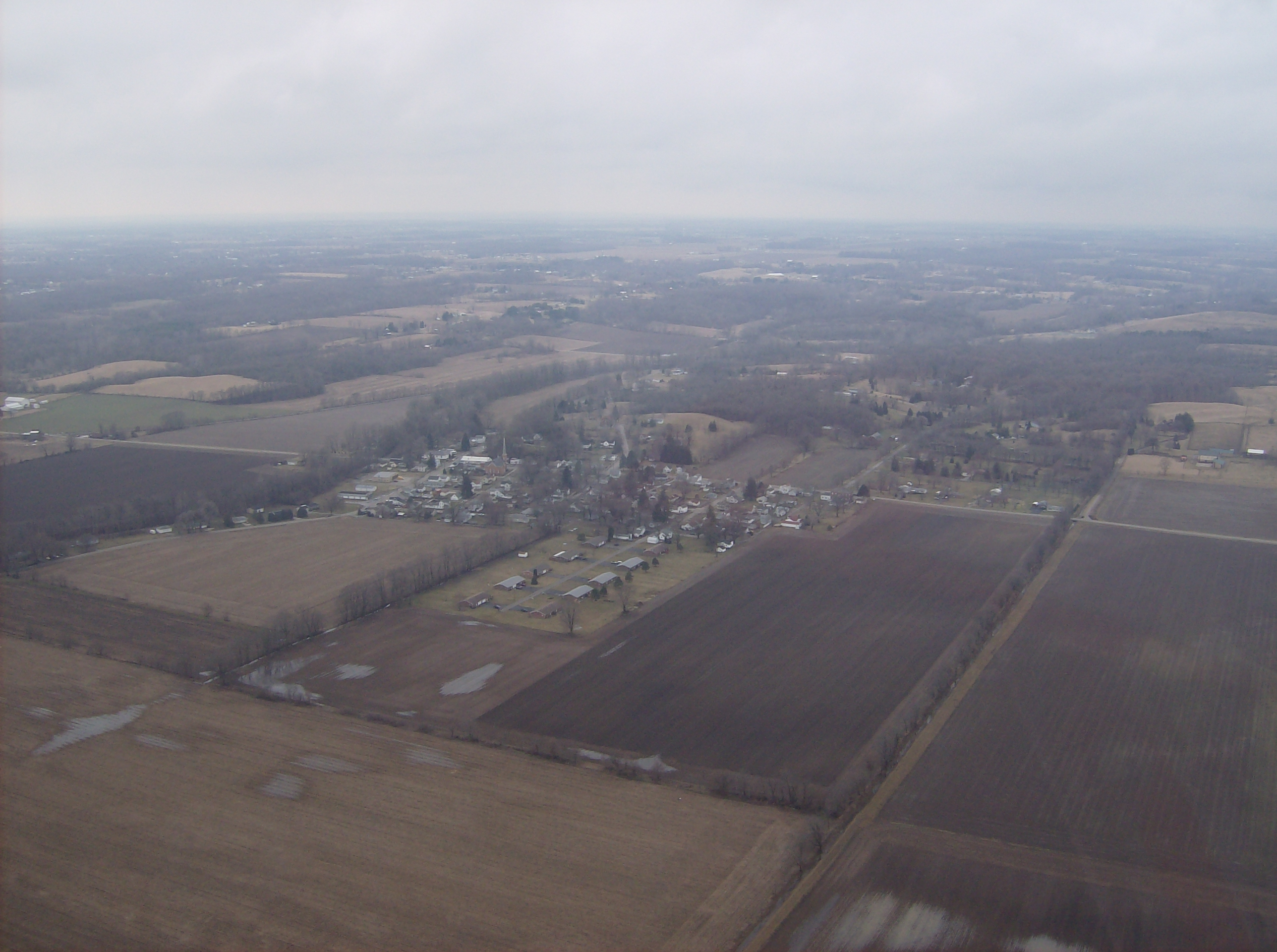
- Tremont City from the air

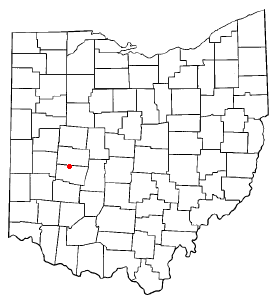
- Location of Tremont City, Ohio

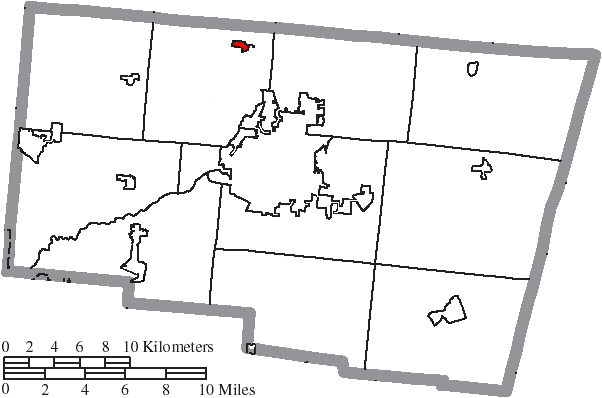
- Location of Tremont City in Clark County
- Coordinates: 40°00′58″N 83°50′33″W
- Country: United States
- State: Ohio
- County: Clark
- Township: German

Area
  - Total: 0.22 sq mi (0.57 km^{2})
  - Land: 0.22 sq mi (0.57 km^{2})
  - Water: 0 sq mi (0.00 km^{2})
- Elevation: 1,004 ft (306 m)

Population (2020)
  - Total: 352
  - Density: 1,589.8/sq mi (613.84/km^{2})
- Time zone: UTC-5 (Eastern (EST))
  - Summer (DST): UTC-4 (EDT)
- ZIP code: 45372
- Area codes: 937, 326
- FIPS code: 39-77308
- GNIS feature ID: 2400001
- Website: https://www.tremontcity-oh.com/

Tremont City is a village in Clark County, Ohio, United States. The population was 352 at the 2020 census. The village is part of the Springfield, Ohio Metropolitan Statistical Area.

== History ==
Tremont City was originally known at Treemount because the settlement was situated at the base of a hill covered with large trees. A post office called Tremont was established in 1839, and the name was changed to Tremont City in 1877.

== Geography ==
According to the United States Census Bureau, the village has a total area of 0.26 square miles (0.67 km^{2}), all of it land.

== Demographics ==
Historical population
Census	Pop.	Note	%±
1880	279		—
1920	287		—
1930	288		0.3%
1940	406		41.0%
1950	396		−2.5%
1960	414		4.5%
1970	426		2.9%
1980	374		−12.2%
1990	493		31.8%
2000	349		−29.2%
2010	375		7.4%
2020	352		−6.1%
U.S. Decennial Census

=== 2010 census ===
As of the census of 2010, there were 375 people, 151 households, and 99 families living in the village. The population density was 1,442.3 inhabitants per square mile (556.9/km^{2}). There were 166 housing units at an average density of 638.5 units per square mile (246.5 units/km^{2}). The racial makeup of the village was 98.9% White, 0.3% African American, 0.3% Asian, 0.3% from other races, and 0.3% from two or more races. Hispanic or Latino of any race were 1.6% of the population.

There were 151 households, of which 31.1% had children under the age of 18 living with them, 43.0% were married couples living together, 17.2% had a female householder with no husband present, 5.3% had a male householder with no wife present, and 34.4% were non-families. 28.5% of all households were made up of individuals, and 6.6% had someone living alone who was 65 years of age or older. The average household size was 2.48 and the average family size was 2.99.

The median age in the village was 39.4 years. 20.8% of residents were under the age of 18; 12.6% were between the ages of 18 and 24; 25.3% were from 25 to 44; 30.4% were from 45 to 64; and 10.9% were 65 years of age or older. The gender makeup of the village was 52.0% male and 48.0% female.

=== 2000 census ===
As of the census of 2000, there were 349 people, 134 households, and 95 families living in the village. The population density was 1,306.5 inhabitants per square mile (504.4/km^{2}). There were 138 housing units at an average density of 516.6 units per square mile (199.5 units/km^{2}). The racial makeup of the village was 97.42% White, 1.15% African American, 0.57% Native American, and 0.86% from two or more races. Hispanic or Latino of any race were 0.57% of the population.

There were 134 households, out of which 41.0% had children under the age of 18 living with them, 50.7% were married couples living together, 13.4% had a female householder with no husband present, and 28.4% were non-families. 24.6% of all households were made up of individuals, and 3.0% had someone living alone who was 65 years of age or older. The average household size was 2.60 and the average family size was 3.10.

In the village, the population was spread out, with 29.8% under the age of 18, 8.6% from 18 to 24, 34.4% from 25 to 44, 19.8% from 45 to 64, and 7.4% who were 65 years of age or older. The median age was 32 years. For every 100 females there were 93.9 males. For every 100 females age 18 and over, there were 97.6 males.

The median income for a household in the village was $50,000, and the median income for a family was $51,250. Males had a median income of $33,958 versus $26,875 for females. The per capita income for the village was $19,139. About 7.5% of families and 5.8% of the population were below the poverty line, including 3.2% of those under age 18 and 20.0% of those age 65 or over.

== Transportation ==
Mad River Airport, a private airport, located 1 mile (1.6 km) northeast of the city.

== Education ==
It is in the Northwestern Local School District.
