= Pershing Rifles =

Military-oriented college honor society

- Founded: October 2, 1894; 132 years ago University of Nebraska–Lincoln
- Type: Honor
- Former affiliation: PFA
- Status: Active
- Emphasis: Military
- Scope: National
- Colors: Blue and White
- Symbol: Pershing Rifles Coat of Arms
- Flower: White Rose
- Publication: The National Shield
- Chapters: 60 Units
- National Commander: MG Jahan Martin (since March 14, 2026)
- Headquarters: 500 Westover Drive; Suite #1400; Sanford, North Carolina 27330; United States
- Website: www.pershingriflessociety.org

The National Society of Pershing Rifles is a U.S. military-oriented honor society for college-level students founded in 1894 as a drill unit at the University of Nebraska–Lincoln. It is the oldest continuously operating U.S. college organization dedicated to military drill. Originally named Varsity Rifles, members renamed the organization in honor of their mentor and patron, Lieutenant (later General of the Armies of the United States) John J. Pershing, upon his departure from the university in 1895.

Pershing Rifles became a national organization in 1928 expanding to include several other universities, with companies consisting of drill teams as well as tactical units. Together, these units form what is known as the National Society of Pershing Rifles.

== History ==
=== Founding ===
In 1891, General Pershing, then a 2LT in Troop L, 6th Cavalry Regiment at Fort Bayard, New Mexico, became the Professor of Military Science and Tactics at the University of Nebraska. Pershing wished to increase the morale and discipline of the battalion there and support for the Cadet Corps throughout the university's staff and community. To this end, he formed a hand-picked company of men, known as Company A, and made them his premier drill unit.

The following year, Company A won the Maiden Competition at the National Competitive Drills held at Omaha, Nebraska, earning the "Omaha Cup" and $1,500 for the group. The spectators were so excited by the event that they left their seats and carried the cadets off the field. On 2 October 1894, former members of Company A formed "Varsity Rifles". A total of 39 picked cadets and alumni met in the university's armory to hold their first meeting, Lieutenant Pershing consented to act as temporary drillmaster for the organization. On 1 June 1895, the organization, in appreciation of the initiative and cooperation of LT. Pershing changed its name to the "Pershing Rifles." Under Pershing's leadership, the organization won the Army Silver Cup for drill team competition, second after West Point. When Pershing left Nebraska in 1895, at a committee's request, he gave the company a pair of his cavalry breeches. These breeches were cut into small pieces and were worn on the uniform as a sign of membership.

The first decade of the 20th century saw the Pershing Rifles reach the height of its existence before the First World War. It was one of the most important features of the University of Nebraska military and social life. Membership was considered a great military honor. Its influence in the Military Department continued strong until just before World War I.

As war clouds gathered over Europe in 1915, Pershing Rifles membership declined. By 1918 the Reserve Officer's Training Program (ROTC), which had just been established two years earlier in 1916 was suspended. It was temporarily replaced by the Students' Army Training Corps (SATC) which had a mission of rapidly training and commissioning new officers for service in World War I. As a result, the Pershing Rifles activities at the University of Nebraska were suspended and its records were burned.

The end of World War I saw the disbandment of SATC and the return to campus of ROTC and Pershing Rifles.

=== Reestablishment ===
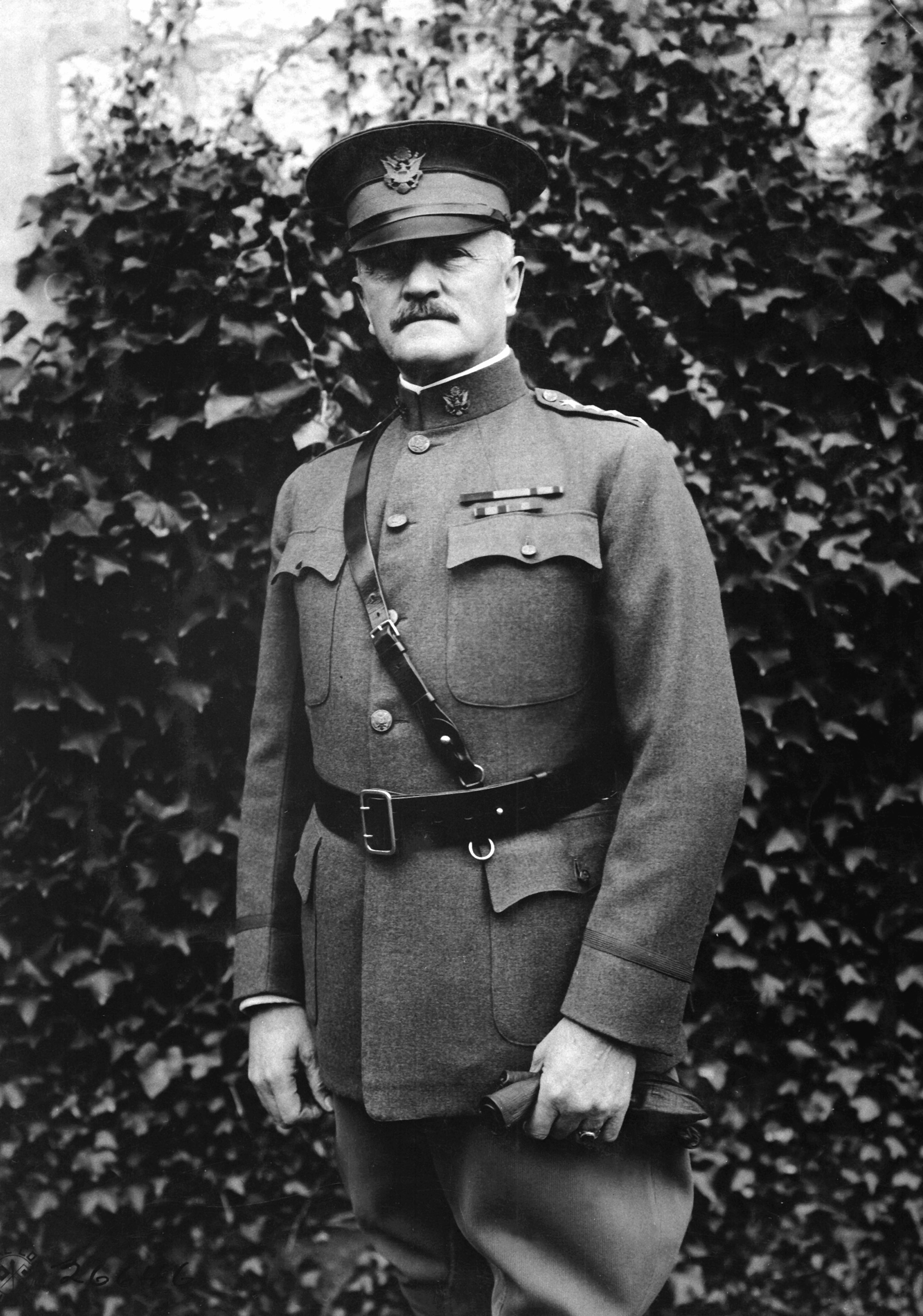
A 1918 photo of General of the Armies John J. Pershing. Pershing maintained a deep and abiding interest in Pershing Rifles for his entire life.

In 1919 the Pershing Rifles was reborn. As organized in 1919, the Pershing Rifles became an organization for junior officers. It regained its status as a fraternal organization for ROTC basic course cadets. The presence of Scabbard and Blade on the Nebraska campus probably prevented its growth as an officers' organization.

By the 1920s, the prestige of the organization was once again on the rise, in no small part due to the popularity of General of the Armies John J. Pershing, then one of the most famous people in the World as the result of his skilled leadership of the American Expeditionary Force in World War I. Special drill units across the nation began to seek admittance into the Pershing Rifles.

The present National Society of Pershing Rifles owes its existence to Ohio State University (OSU). In the spring of 1924, it applied for affiliation with the Pershing Rifles, but the Nebraska organization refused. The Ohio State group, seeing the need for a national organization for basic course ROTC men, threatened to nationalize "The President's Guard" and leave Nebraska out of it if the two organizations could not work together. Finally, after a year of negotiations, Nebraska's Pershing Riflemen approved Ohio State's formal application of 13 May 1925. Ohio State's company was chartered on 22 May 1925, marking the beginning of a nationwide organization.

The year 1928 brought the establishment of an official National Headquarters at the University of Nebraska which was organized along the lines of a U.S. Army brigade headquarters. P/R Colonel John P. McKnight was the first National Commander. National Headquarters used 1928 to plan the foundation for an expansion at the company level which would ensure a strong national organization. In the summer of the same year, several circulars were sent to universities that did not hold Pershing Rifles units, inviting their crack drill units to apply for charters from the national headquarters. Those who knew the value of the Pershing Rifles as an organization capable of promoting interest in drill work for basic students heeded the circulars. During that summer, officers attached to the schools where Pershing Rifles chapters were hosted met with officers from other institutions, and as such, the organization received excellent publicity.

By 1929, six companies formed the original nucleus of the Pershing Rifles national organization:

- National Headquarters – University of Nebraska
- First Battalion, Company B – Ohio State University – 1925
- First Battalion, Company C – University of Tennessee – 1927
- First Battalion, Company D – University of Iowa – 192
- Second Battalion, Company E – Northwestern University – 1929
- Second Battalion, Company F – Indiana University – 1929

By 1935 the Pershing Rifles had grown to 22 companies. The 1930s were the first Golden Age of Pershing Rifles, which saw so much sustained growth that it had expanded its structure to emulate the organization of the World War I U.S. Army Infantry Division.

Pershing Rifles again closed its doors in 1943, this time as a result of World War II. Active and alumni Pershing Riflemen went off to war, serving with distinction and valor. One example is Marine Corps Major Kenneth D. Bailey, an alumnus of Company F-3 at the University of Illinois. Major Bailey was killed in action on September 26, 1942, on Guadalcanal in the Solomon Islands and posthumously received the Medal of Honor for his valor that day. Another is Army Air Force Lt Richard Joyce, an alumnus of Company A-2 at the University of Nebraska, who piloted a B-25 that bombed Japan as part of the famous Doolittle Raid on 18 April 1942.

=== Post World War II history ===
The society was reactivated in January 1946, heralding the second Golden Age of Pershing Rifles which lasted to the early 1970s. During World War II many Pershing Riflemen were drafted directly from college and served as enlisted men to meet urgent wartime manpower requirements. After the war, they returned to finish their college education using their G.I. Bill education benefits. It was this nucleus of WWII combat veterans that spearheaded the rebirth of Pershing Rifles.

The late 1940s and the 1950s were years of great expansion for the society. By 1948, just two years after reactivation, Pershing Rifles had grown to 38 companies in seven regiments. It was now larger than its prewar strength. By 1957, Pershing Rifles had grown to 130 units in twelve regiments an over 300% increase in size in just 11 years.

In 1955, Pershing Rifles produced and released a documentary, "The Highest Ideals". This 27-minute Technicolor film discussed the history, traditions, and missions of Pershing Rifles. Copies of the film were distributed to Pershing Rifles units throughout the country as a means of promoting the organization to prospective members.

With the establishment of a separate U.S. Air Force on 18 September 1947, Air Force ROTC cadets joined the ranks of Pershing Rifles. The Pershing Rifles National Assembly in November 1947 agreed to accept Navy ROTC cadets making the society a true multi-service organization.

With the President's Executive Order 9981 of 26 July 1948 that abolished racial discrimination in the U.S. Armed Forces, Pershing Rifles rapidly integrated African American cadets and Historically Black units into the society. As a result, today the society counts among its alumni many African American military leaders such as General Colin Powell former chairman of the Joint Chiefs of Staff and United States secretary of state.

Over the next several decades, the Pershing Rifles continued to grow. In 1961, the society had 139 active units with nearly 4,100 initiates for that year alone. Then Pershing Rifles disappeared from many college campuses during and following the Vietnam War with the dissolution of ROTC programs and the end of compulsory ROTC basic courses. In response to the shrinking number of units and riflemen within these units, the National Headquarters increased the emphasis on tactics and marksmanship. By 1974 the Pershing Rifles was organized into thirteen regiments comprising 137 units.

The Coed Affiliates Pershing Rifles (CAPERS), established in 1966, were the first officially recognized female auxiliary to the society which established units alongside Pershing Rifles units for decades until it was disbanded in the 1980s. The 1970s saw the introduction of women into the National Society of Pershing Rifles as full members, with the first female pledge at Company L-4 (North Carolina State University) in 1971 and the first female active member from M-16 (Florida State University) a year later.

The high school auxiliary to Pershing Rifles, The National Society of Blackjacks (a tribute to General Pershing's nickname), was founded in 1967 as an after-school programs that provide positive leadership experience through drill.

The late 1970s through the 1990s was a period where the number of Pershing Rifles units continued to decline. After Desert Storm both the U.S. Military and Pershing Rifles were hard-pressed to attract members. However, the society continued in a few Pershing Rifles units across the country. The spirit, strength, and traditions of the society continued in a few strong Pershing Rifles units across the country.

The 9/11 attacks created a groundswell of support for the U.S. military brought on by a new spirit of patriotism in the American public. This was echoed in the sense of duty and service amongst college students which has sustained the growth and popularity of Pershing Rifles from 2001 to the present.

After over 130 years, the Pershing Rifles continues to inspire students and create future leaders in the military, business, industry, and the arts.

== Mission ==
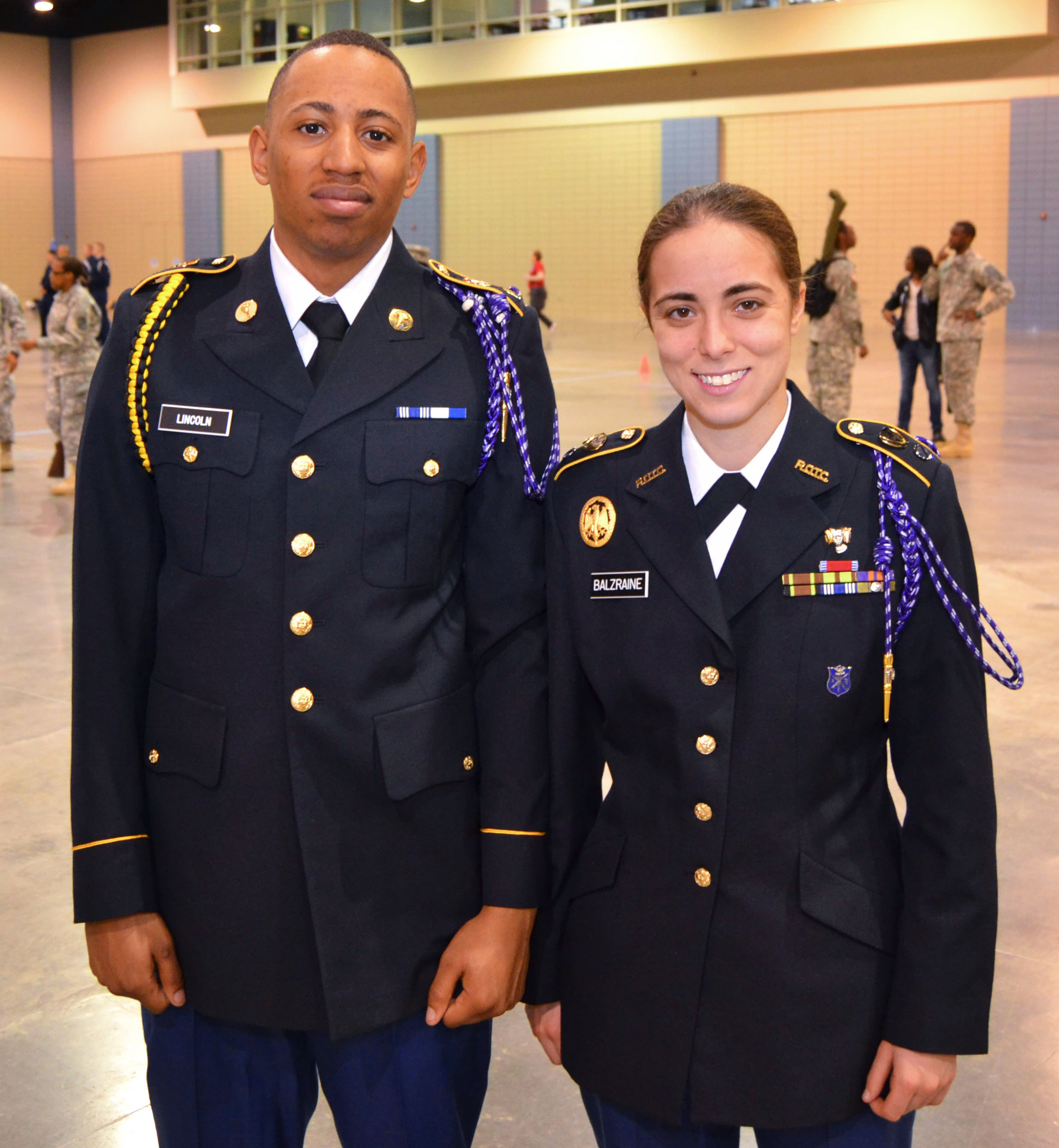
Pershing Riflemen in 2014. Drill, Leadership, Service, and Camaraderie are the foundation of Pershing Rifles

The mission of the National Society of Pershing Rifles is to aid in the development of successful officers in the Army, Navy, and Air Force. To foster camaraderie and esprit de corps among all three Reserve Officers' Training Corps programs. To further the purpose, traditions, and concepts of the United States Army, Navy, and Air Force. And to allow civilians to be part of a military organization without a formal commitment to the military.

== Symbols ==
The symbols of Pershing Rifles are:

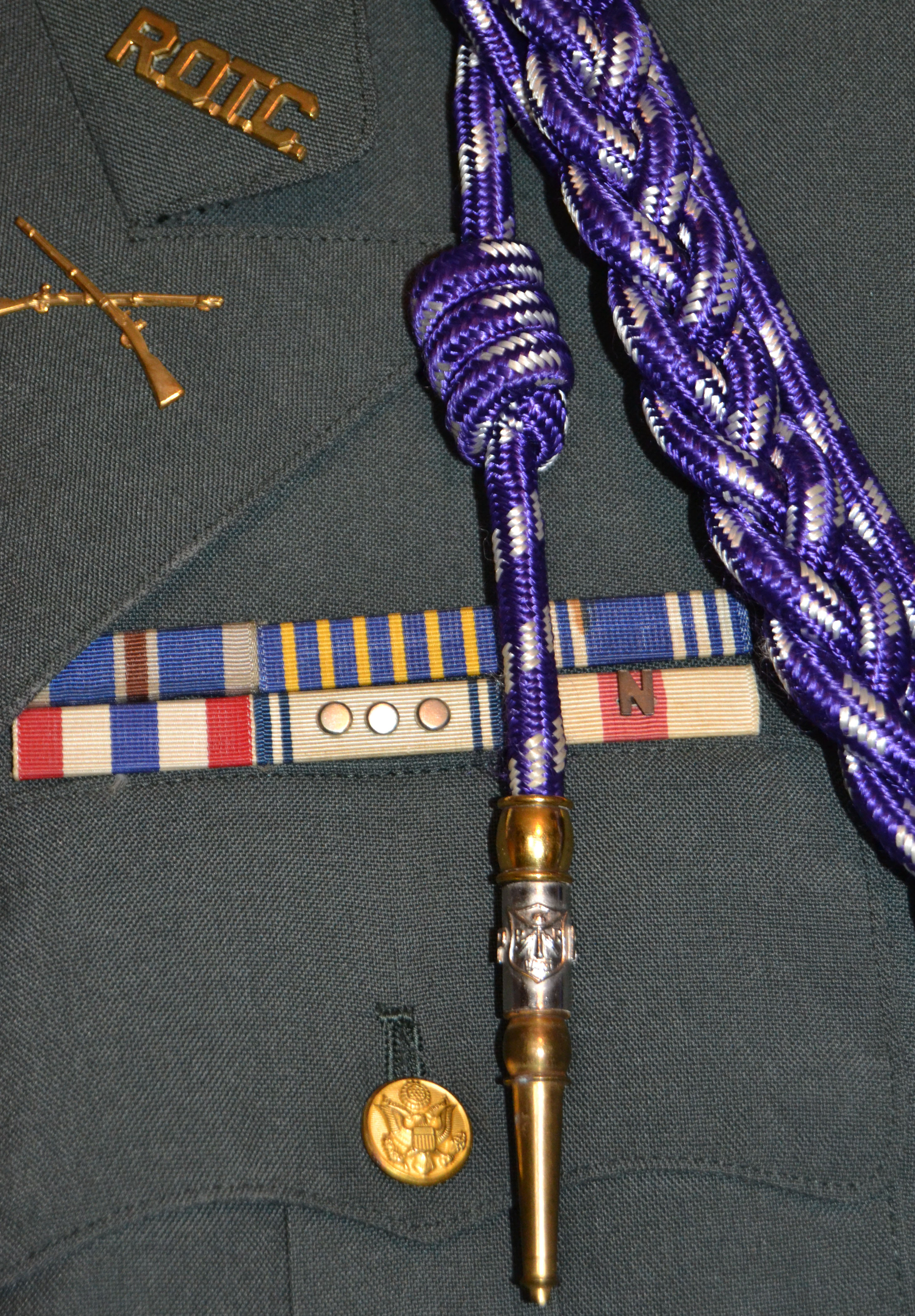
Pershing Rifles Membership Shoulder Cord (Fourragère) and Membership Ribbon on a uniform from the late 1970s.

- Official Colors – Blue and white are the official colors of Pershing Rifles. These colors have traditional national significance and each represents the cornerstones of the society and its members. Blue is symbolic of Loyalty, Devotion, Friendship, and Truth. White symbolizes Purity, Cleanliness of Life, and Rectitude of Conduct. All are qualities that Pershing Rifles looks for in its members.
- Coat of Arms – The shield, crossed rifles, and torch design with "P" and "R" had been used by Pershing Rifles as early as 1928. The coat of arms was adopted at the 1932 National Convention by the National Legislative Body. The official coat of arms consists of a Grecian helmet and torso over the shield, crossed rifles, and torch with the inscription "Pershing Rifles" and the founding date "1894."
- Membership Ribbon – The Membership Ribbon, adopted by Pershing Rifles in 1951, is identical to the Army Good Conduct Medal (except it is blue rather than red), which denotes exemplary conduct at all times. It is worn on the left breast of the uniform. The six white stripes on the membership ribbon, from the wearer's right to left stand for; Devotion to Duty and Country, A Bold and True Heart, Readiness to Meet any Situation, Leadership, Military Proficiency, and Scholarship.
- Membership Shoulder Cord (Fourragère) – The Shoulder Cord is a symbol of honor bestowed to the Pershing Rifles member upon initiation and is to be worn on the left shoulder. First worn by Pershing Riflemen at the University of Nebraska as early as 1924, The original colors of the cord were blue and white – the colors of the society. The Cord has been purple and white with the tip bearing the Pershing Rifles Crest since the late 1950s. There is no documented evidence as to why this change was made.
- Official Flower – The White Rose. Traditionally, this flower represents the most important man or family of the era. The white rose symbolizes the great life of the society's patron, General of the Armies John Joseph Pershing, who made the ideals of the Pershing Rifles a reality.
- Jewel – There is no official Jewel of Pershing Rifles, however, both pearls and diamonds were used in early Pershing Rifles badges.

== Focus on drill ==
Pershing Rifles is a leadership development program with a foundation in close-order and exhibition rifle drill. Excellence in drill, whether armed or unarmed, is a function of discipline and dedication that translates into other endeavors in life. These traits are put to work regularly by Pershing Rifles units which typically perform as color guards, exhibition drill teams, honor guards, funeral details, or ceremonial duties. These services are usually in support of the local ROTC detachment or school but are sometimes requested by alumni, local governments, or active-duty military units. Through all of these activities, in addition to the skills gained by the students, positive publicity is also received by the unit's host school, host ROTC detachment, and ultimately the military in general. Pershing Rifles hosts the John J. Pershing Memorial Drill Competition each spring which attracts some of the finest college and high school-level drill teams in the nation.

== Membership and competitions ==
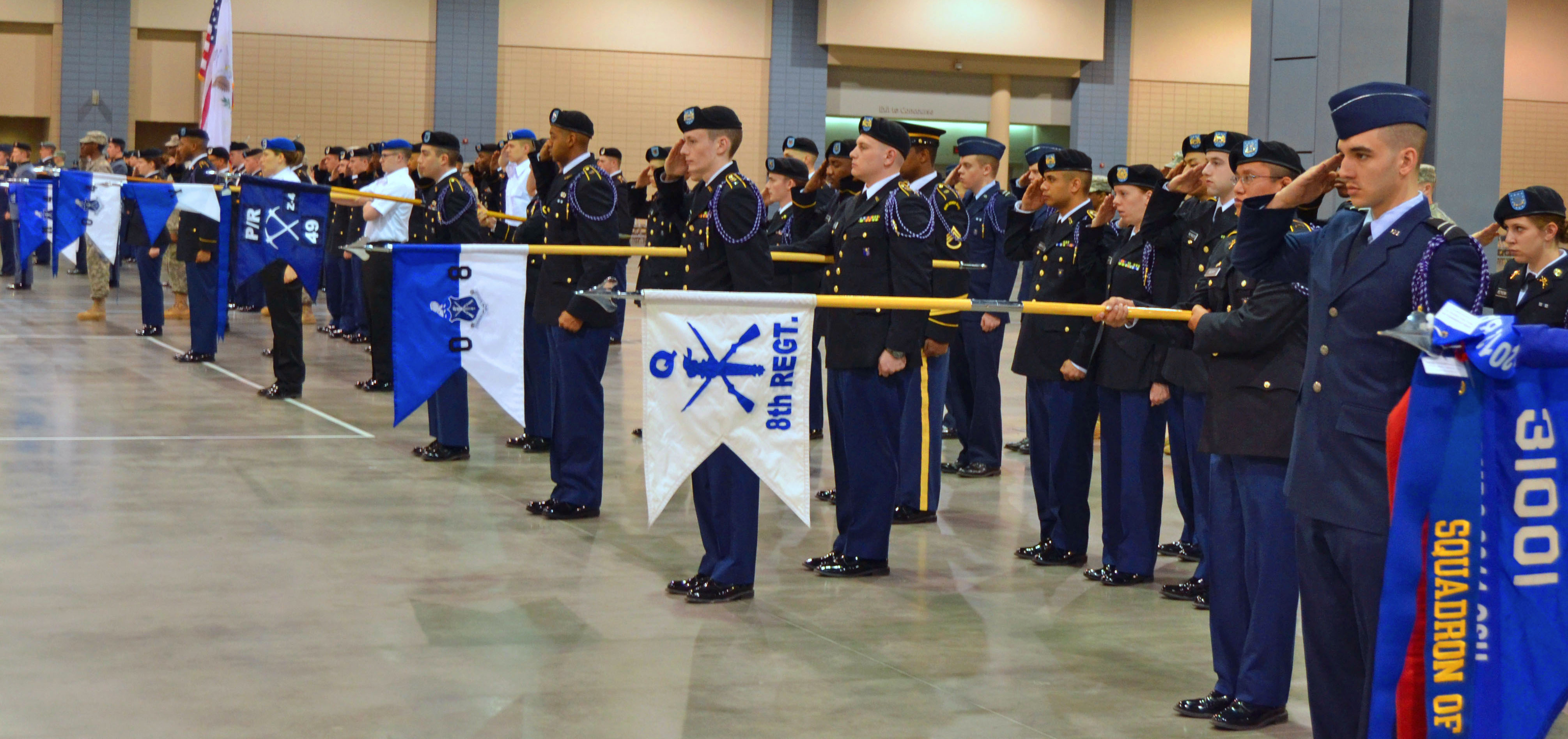
Pershing Riflemen in formation before the John J. Pershing Memorial Drill Competition during NATCON 2014 held in Richmond, Virginia.

Active membership is restricted to college students enrolled at an institution that hosts a Pershing Rifles company. Members may be either male or female and while a majority have affiliation with the military (especially ROTC), it is not a prerequisite for membership.

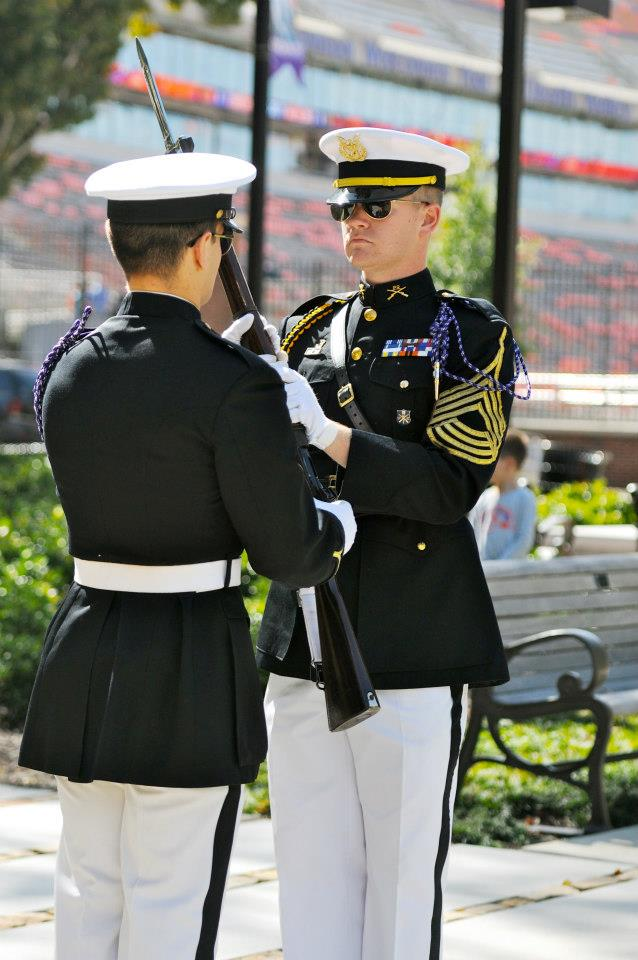
Army ROTC cadet Richard Moore of Clemson University's Pershing Rifles Company C-4 inspects a cadet as part of the changing of the guard ceremony at The Scroll of Honor. Members of the Pershing Rifles provide a 24-hour honor guard to pay respect to the men and women whose names are on the Scroll of Honor. (National Guard photo by Spc. Brian R. Calhoun)

Each company has latitude in selecting its uniform and weapons. They vary from company T-shirts and BDU or ACU pants to more formal uniforms, like the Army's service uniforms, or "Class A's". Many companies wear berets, in a wide variety of colors. The only real consistencies within companies are the wear of a Pershing Rifles rank shield and, on dress uniforms, a shoulder cord and the Pershing Rifles Service Ribbon, which is blue with six vertical white lines, symbolic of the six core values held by a Pershing Rifleman.

Former Company W-4 at The College of William & Mary wore uniforms based on those of the Scots Guards as recognition of their role as the Queens' Guard, the college's ceremonial guard unit, twice mustered upon visits by Queen Elizabeth II to the college.

Most Pershing Rifles companies use older battle rifles (especially the M1903 Springfield or M1 Garand) in performing routines. At the annual National Society of Pershing Rifles National Convention and Drill Competition (NATCON), active companies compete in various categories of regulation drill (like proficiency at performing a color guard) and exhibition drill (also known as trick drill, involving spinning or throwing the rifles).

Other Pershing Rifles companies, such as Company A-12 (Northeastern University), Company B-9 (University of Colorado at Boulder), Company C-9 (Colorado School of Mines), Company B-12 (Boston University) and Company C-12 (ABN) (Massachusetts Institute of Technology), focus on tactical training. Company C-4 (Clemson University) practices and focuses on regulation D&C, and a mastery of exhibition drill.

== Units ==
Pershing Rifles is organized by units consisting of companies or squadrons, regiments or brigades, and the national headquarters. Currently, Pershing Rifles has a combined regimental structure where two or more regiments are grouped under one regimental commander who may be selected from any unit in the combined regiment. By tradition, its National Headquarters is at the University of Nebraska at Lincoln. However, the current national staff is selected from across the society, and staff members may be from several different Pershing Rifles units.

The regimental headquarters are listed below.

- 1st Regiment Headquarters – University of Toledo, Toledo, Ohio / Ohio State University, Columbus, Ohio
- 2nd Regiment Headquarters – Marquette University, Milwaukee, Wisconsin / University of Minnesota, Minneapolis, Minnesota / University of Iowa, Iowa City, Iowa
- 3rd Regiment/Brigade Headquarters – Indiana University Bloomington, Bloomington, Indiana
- 4th Regiment Headquarters – Clemson University, Clemson, South Carolina
- 5th Regiment Headquarters – Pennsylvania State University, University Park, Pennsylvania
- 6th Regiment/Brigade Headquarters – Louisiana State University, Baton Rouge, Louisiana / University of Idaho, Moscow, Idaho
- 7th Regiment/Brigade Headquarters – Oklahoma State University–Stillwater, Stillwater, Oklahoma
- 8th Regiment Headquarters – City College of New York / Seton Hall University / Saint Peters College
- 9th Regiment Headquarters – University of Colorado Boulder, Boulder, Colorado / University of Denver, Denver, Colorado (1958)
- 10th Regiment Headquarters – Northern Arizona University, Flagstaff, Arizona / University of Arizona (1958–1959)
- 11th Regiment Headquarters – Oregon State University, Corvallis, Oregon (ended after 1964)
- 12th Regiment Headquarters – Massachusetts Institute of Technology, Cambridge, Massachusetts, through June 1962; Northeastern University, Boston, Massachusetts, June 1962 through c. 1978 / University of Connecticut, Storrs, Connecticut
- 14th Brigade/Regiment Headquarters – Northern Arizona University, Flagstaff, Arizona
- 15th Regiment Headquarters – University of Maryland, College Park, College Park, Maryland
- 16th Regiment/Brigade Headquarters – University of Tampa, Tampa, Florida / Florida State University, Tallahassee, Florida
- 17th Regiment Headquarters – Prairie View A&M University, Prairie View, Texas / Trinity University, San Antonio, Texas

== National commanders ==
P/R Rank	Name	Years of Service
COL	John P. McKnight	1928–29
MG	Ray E. Sabata	1929–30
MG	Carl J. Hahn	1930–31
MG	William Comstock	1931–32 (Resigned)
MG	Claude A. Gillespie	1931–32
MG	E. Bryon Hirst	1932–33
MG	Richard A. Moran	1933–34
MG	Tom F. Naughtin	1934–35
COL	James A. Wilson	1935–36
COL	John E. Jarmin	1936–37
COL	Harry R. Haynie	1937–38
COL	J. Wade Raser	1938–39
COL	Jean A. Wolf	1939–40
COL	Warren B. Day	1940–41
COL	Fred H. Voight	1941–42
COL	Roger D. Anderson	1942–43
WARTIME	INACTIVATION	1943–45
BG	John D. Cooper	1946
BG	Robert B. Avner	1946–47
BG	John W. Plantikow	1947–48
BG	Paul G. Hanson	1948–49
BG	William R. Mook	1949–50
BG	James M. Worth	1950–51
BG	Thomas G. Irwin	1951–52
BG	John A. Graf	1952–53
BG	Dean E. Ekberg	1953–54
BG	Virgil Holtgrewe	1954–55
BG	William F. Wetzlaff	1955–56
BG	Thomas V. Hoffman	1956–57
BG	Allan S. Irwin	1957–58
MG	Pat Y. Kuncl	1958–59
MG	Larry B. Novicki	1959–60
MG	Kenneth F. Tempero	1960–61
MG	J. Marshall Kuhr	1961–62
MG	Larry W. Berger	1962–63
MG	Roger R. Stork	1963–64
MG	Mark F. Anderson	1964–65
MG	John E. Mullens	1965–66
MG	James W. Belmont	1966–67
MG	James W. Belmont	1967–68
MG	William J. Krondak	1968–69
MG	William T. Anton	1969 (Resigned)
MG	Dennis L. Lambert	1969–70
MG	James K. Radcliff	1970–71
MG	Keith A. Heimes	1971–72
MG	Lance Wismer	1972–73
MG	Pat A. Bates	1973–74
Rear Admiral	C. Phillip "Phil" Warrick	1974–75
Rear Admiral	C. Phillip "Phil" Warrick	1975–76
MG	Alfred V. Parrish	1976–77
MG	Randall L. Young	1977–78
MG	Brian P. Leary	May 78 –Jan 79
MG	Carol A. Peterson	Jan 79 – Mar 79
MG	Kevin M. Born	1979–80
MG	Jesse J. Rose	1980 (Resigned)
MG	Paula R. Harmon	1980–81
MG	David R. Earnest	1981–82
MG	Teresa L. Whitehead	1982–83
MG	Mark A. Ludwig	1983–84
MG	Tim M. Whalen	1984–85
MG	Craig W. Carlson	1985–86
MG	Lois J. Anderson	1986–87
MG	Jeffery A. James	1987–88
MG	Reed K. Smith	1988–89
MG	David J Olsen	1989–90
MG	Pamela L. Dingman	1990–91
NAME	UNKNOWN	1991–97
MG	Rachel Lippert	1997–98
NAME	UNKNOWN	1998–2000
MG	Paul J. Stoural	2000–01
NAME	UNKNOWN	2001–02
MG	Andrew Smallwood	2002–03
MG	Aaron Hall	2003–04
MG	James Hunter-Chester	2004–05
MG	Monica M. Olson	2005–06
MG	David Poe	2006–07
MG	Christopher D. Scheuermann+	2007–08
MG	Geoffrey Robinson	2008–09
MG	Tom Carlsen	2009–10
MG	Andrea R. Walsh / Rebecca E. Scholand	2010–11
MG	Nathan Jurgens	2011–12
MG	Durrell D. Williams	2012
MG	Paul C. Omichinski	2013–14
MG	Donte' Hanns	2014–15
MG	Selby Barron	March – April 2015 (Resigned)
MG	Tymothy Whisenand	2015–16
LTG	Tymothy Whisenand	2016–17
MG	Alex J. Meier	11 March - 19 September 2017 (Resigned)
MG	Carrie A. Viscanti	19 September 2017 – 10 March 2018
MG	Maximillian Curtis	10 March 2018 – 22 August 2019
MG	Zackery Day	22 August 2019 – 13 March 2020
MG	Caroline Knight	14 March 2020 – March 2021
MG	Brandy Vega	March 2021 – 14 March 2022
MG	Mackenzie Larsen	14 March 2022 – 11 March 2023
MG	Austin Smith	11 March 2023 – 16 March 2024
MG	Logan Bowland	16 March 2024 – 8 March 2025
MG	Chloe Lemos	8 March 2025 – 14 March 2026
MG	Jahan Martin	14 March 2026 - Present

+ Craig Zagorski was promoted to major general and national commander for one day immediately following the end of Christopher D. Scheuermann's term in 2008.

Note: By tradition a national commander is promoted to lieutenant general/vice admiral if they serve a second term in office. Since the mid-2000s some Pershing Rifles national commanders have been promoted to the rank of Pershing Rifles lieutenant general/vice admiral upon completion of a full term in office.

== Pershing Rifles Group ==
The Pershing Rifles Group is incorporated in the state of Delaware and is a registered 501(C)10 not-for-profit organization under the Internal Revenue Service. It is the supporting corporation to Pershing Rifles which furnishes the society with basic services such as insurance as well as legal, regulatory, and fiscal oversight.

== Pershing Foundation ==
The Pershing Foundation is a 501(c)(3) non-profit organization.

The foundation provides grants and financial support for such things as scholarships, assisting individual Pershing Rifles and Blackjack units, as well as supporting the Pershing Rifles Group's national efforts in expansion and operations. This includes events such as the annual Pershing Rifles National Convention and Alumni Reunion (NATCON) and various regimental drill competitions and alumni reunions.

== Notable members ==
=== Academia ===
- Edward M. Coffman – Company C-1 – Noted military historian
- Elvis Jacob Stahr Jr. – Company C-1 – president West Virginia University and Indiana University; U.S. Secretary of the Army

=== Arts and entertainment ===
- James Earl Jones – Company H-1 – actor
- Robert Mapplethorpe – Company I-8 – photographer

=== Literature ===
- Brooke Magnanti – Company M-16 – bestselling author

=== Military ===
- Kenneth D. Bailey Marine Corps – Company C-3 – posthumous Medal of Honor recipient during the Battle of Guadalcanal
- Myron F. Diduryk – Company N-8 – Two Silver Stars, company commander in the Battle of Ia Drang
- Samuel Ebbesen – Company A-8 – commander, 6th Infantry Division, 2nd Army; civilian aide to the Secretary of the Army, lieutenant general
- Larry Ellis – Company J-8 – commander, Forces Command; general
- Galen Jackman – Company A-2 – commanding general, Military District of Washington; U.S. Army Chief of Legislative Liaison
- Jack Keane – Company D-8 – Vice Chief of Staff of the Army
- Curtis E. LeMay – Company A-1 – Chief of Staff of the Air Force
- Charles McGee – Company C-3 – brigadier general and fighter pilot, Tuskegee Airmen
- Paul T. Mikolashek – Company D-1 – U.S. Army inspector general
- James H. Mukoyama – Company C-3 – Infantry company commander in Vietnam where he was wounded and received the Silver Star, 70th Division commander; major general
- Thomas L. Ridge, Marine Corps – Company F-3 – commander of 3rd Bn 1st Marine Division, during the Korean War led his men to safety in the retreat from the Chosin Reservoir, Silver Star, 3x Purple Heart
- Michael Rochelle – Company C-15 (today R-4) – commanding general, U.S. Army Recruiting Command; Deputy Chief of Staff G-1
- Hugh Shelton – Company L-4 – chairman, Joint Chiefs of Staff
- William E. Ward – Company J-8 – Commander, Africa Command; Lieutenant General
- Christopher P. Weggeman USAF – Company E-3 – deputy commander of Air Combat Command; Lieutenant General

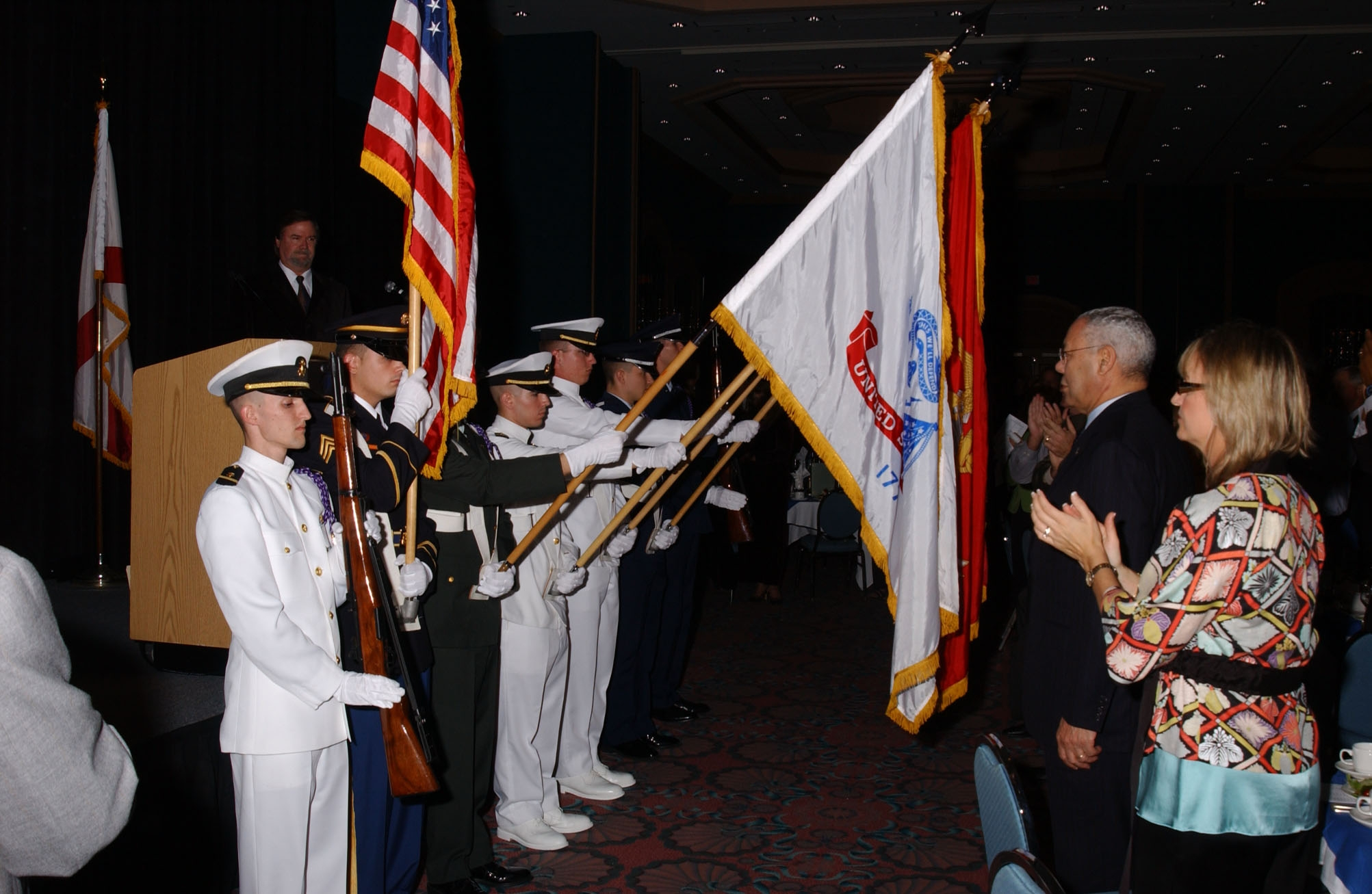
Company E-16 performs a Color Guard for Colin Powell

=== Politics and government ===
- Nelson Gibbs – Company R-8 – Assistant Secretary of the Air Force
- G. Gordon Liddy – FBI agent
- Sid McMath – Governor of Arkansas
- Charles Burton Robbins – member of the original Company A, Assistant Secretary of War 1928–29
- Colin Powell – Company A-8 – chairman, Joint Chiefs of Staff and United States secretary of state
- George L. Sheldon – commander of Company A – 14th governor of Nebraska
- Elvis Jacob Stahr, Jr. – Company C-1 – Secretary of the Army 1961–62, president West Virginia University and Indiana University

=== Sports ===
- Geary Eppley – Athletic Director, University of Maryland 1937–47, won seven national championships

== Photo gallery ==
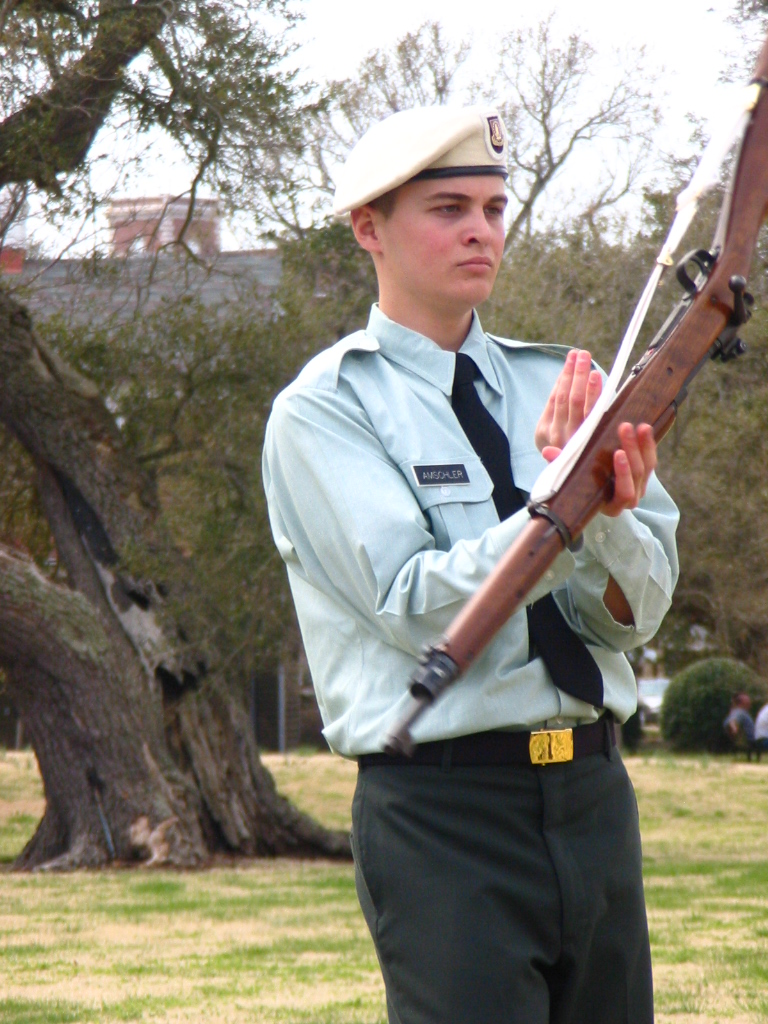
Joe Amschler, EKU Company R-1, performing a solo exhibition drill routine

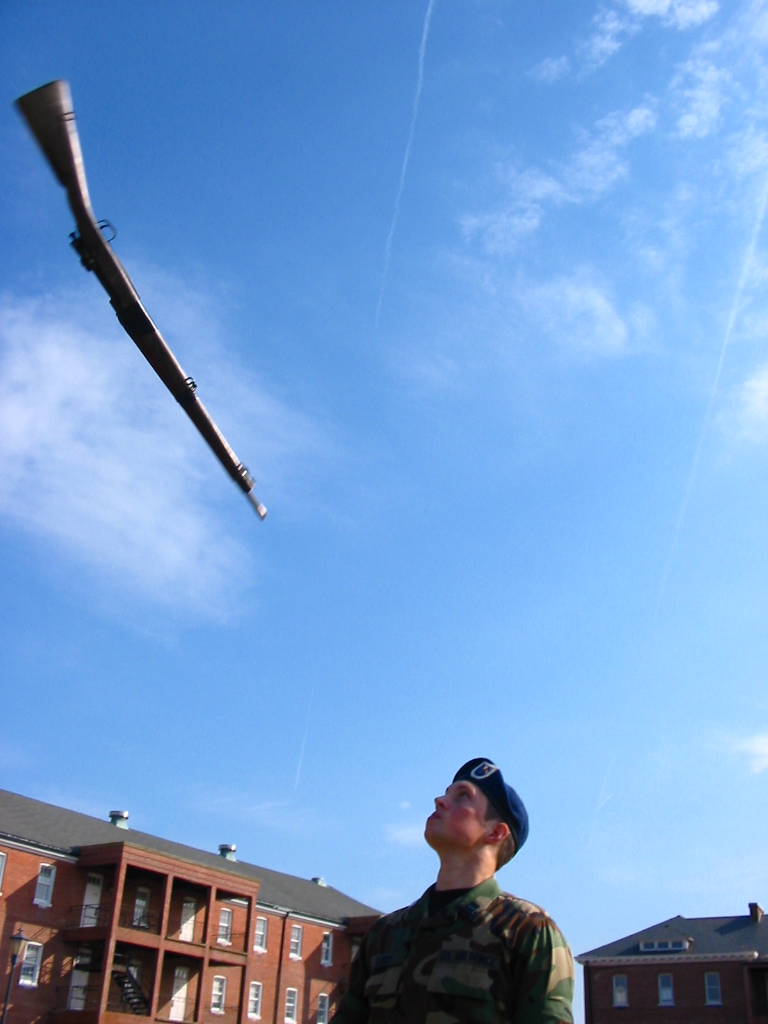
A Pershing Rifleman practicing an exhibition drill routine in Fort Monroe, Virginia

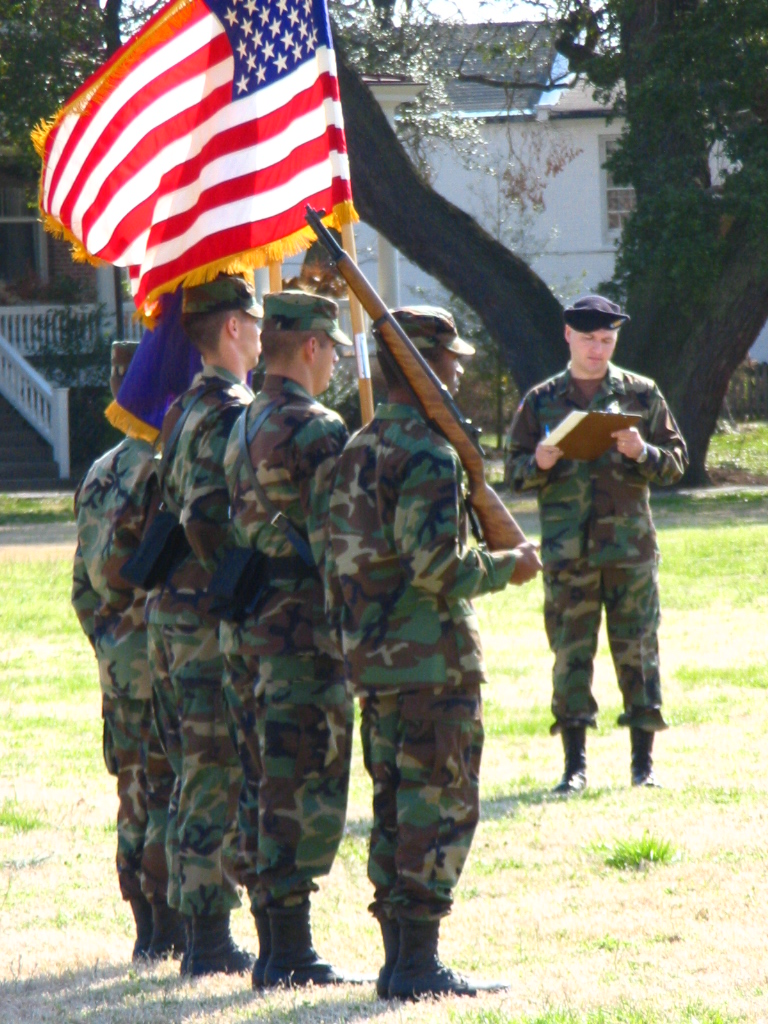
A Pershing Rifles color guard competing at the 2004 NATCON drill competition held at Fort Monroe, Virginia
