= Thomas L. Ridge =

United States Marine Corps officer (1915–1999)

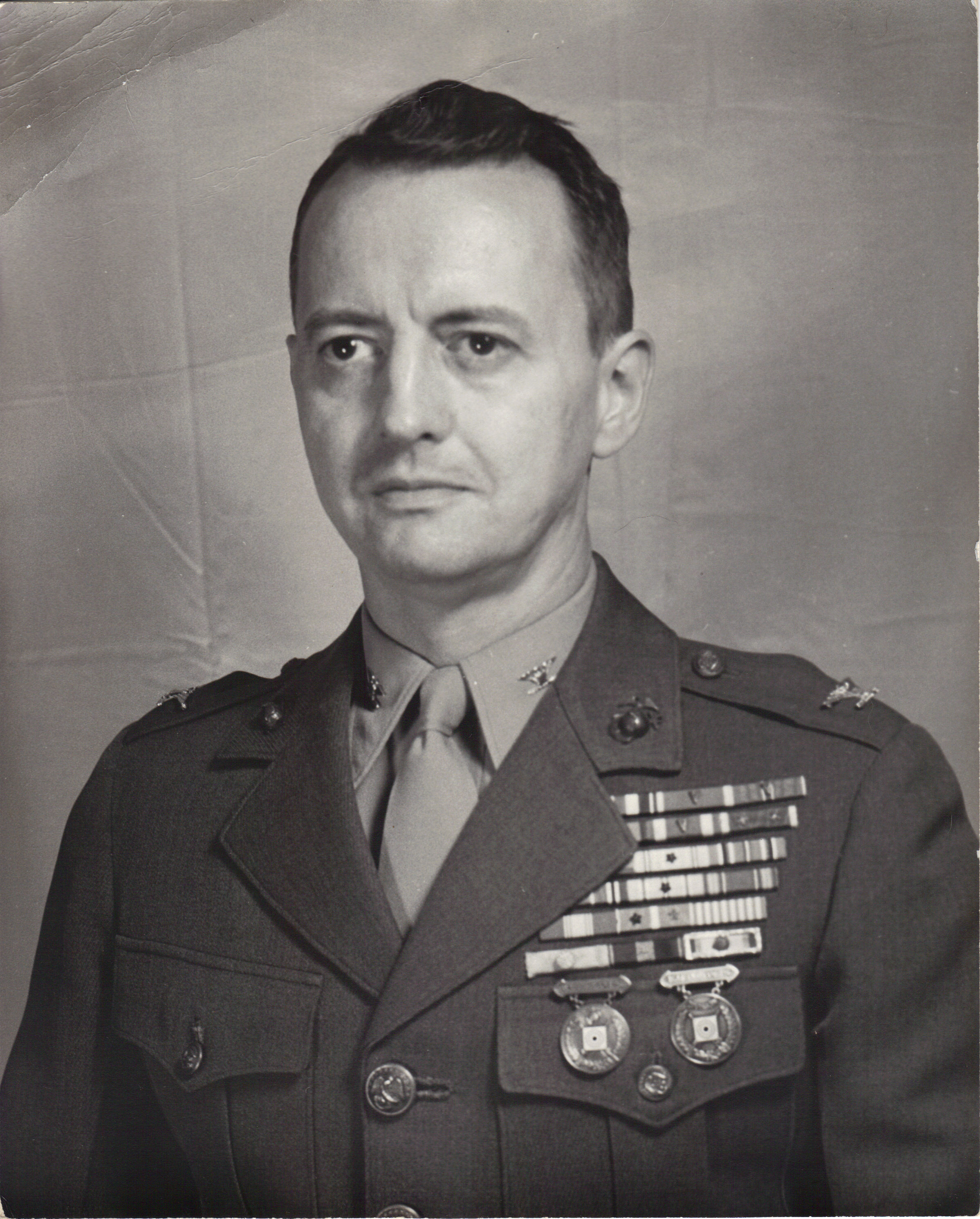
- Born: February 24, 1915; Chicago, Illinois, US
- Died: August 13, 1999 (aged 84); Concord, California, US
- Burial place: Arlington National Cemetery Plot: Section: 66, Grave: 4611
- Military career
- Allegiance: United States
- Branch: United States Marine Corps
- Service years: 1938–1964
- Rank: Colonel
- Conflicts: World War II; Korean War
- Awards: Silver Star; Legion of Merit with Combat "V"; Bronze Star with Combat "V"; Purple Heart; Air Medal

Thomas Lee Ridge (February 14, 1915 – September 13, 1999) was a United States Marine Corps officer who was wounded in Okinawa during World War II in 1945. He received the Silver Star for heroic conduct in the Korean War during street fighting in Seoul, Korea and the Legion of Merit with Combat "V" for his role in the defense of Hagaru-ri and the evacuation from the Chosin Reservoir area. He served as an attaché to Colombia and Ecuador. After retiring from the Marine Corps in the rank of colonel in 1964, he worked as a Department of Defense civilian for 14 years.

== Early life ==
Ridge attended Elgin High School, Elgin, Illinois, graduating in 1934. He attended the University of Illinois and graduated in 1938 with a degree in Business. He participated in the Reserve Officer Training Corps (ROTC) program while at Illinois and was a member of Pershing Rifles Company F-3 as well as Scabbard and Blade. He was heavily involved in marksmanship serving on the university and ROTC marksmanship teams, winning several trophies and eventually becoming the team captain. Ridge received his second lieutenant's commission in the US Army Reserve, however resigned it to accept a commission in the Marine Corps on June 28, 1938. He was ordered to the Marine Barracks, Philadelphia, Pennsylvania, where he completed a course of instruction in the Basic School.

== Military career ==
=== World War II ===
His initial active duty service was as a member of the Marine Detachment aboard the USS Quincy. In the Marine Corps he continued to be involved in rifle marksmanship while serving at Marine Barracks at Boston Navy Yard and later at the Naval Air Station in Jacksonville Florida, where he was assigned as the officer in charge of the Small Bore Rifle Team. in late 1941 Ridge briefly served in the Central Recruiting Division in Chicago where he organized and developed a Mobile Recruiting Unit. From 1942 to 1944 he served as an intelligence officer assigned to the Naval Attaché at the American Embassy in Rio de Janeiro, Brazil. During this tour he assisted the Brazilian Marines with their marksmanship program and planning the establishment of a US Naval Base in Rio de Janeiro as well as other US military facilities in Brazil. Upon his return from Brazil in 1944, he served as an intelligence planner with the Fleet Marine Force-Pacific and participated in the planning of several operations including the invasion of Iwo Jima, Okinawa, and the Occupation of Kyusha. He was wounded twice observing the battle of Okinawa while on temporary duty with the 10th Army.

=== Korean War ===
In 1950, Ridge was given command of the 3rd Battalion, 1st Marines, 1st Marine Division at Camp Lejeune, North Carolina. His battalion would participate in the amphibious landing on Inchon, Korea in September 1950. Later they would advance on and participate in the recapture of Seoul, Korea. Ridge was awarded the Silver Star for his conspicuous gallantry in action for his leadership during the urban combat to recapture Seoul. He also earned another Purple Heart for wounds sustained during the battle. His unit then moved north to defend Hagaru-ri which was just 2500 yards below the southern tip of the Chosin Reservoir. After defending against numerous heavy Chinese attacks his unit fought their way out of the perimeter and south marching to the sea. Later he would receive the Legion of Merit with "V" device for valor for his battalion's defense near the Chosin Reservoir.

=== Post War ===
Promoted to the rank of Colonel in 1954, Ridge became the senior Marine Corps member of the Joint Amphibious Board. From 1955 to 1956 he was the Marine Corps Liaison Officer for Joint Amphibious Matters to the Commander at Little Creek, Virginia. In 1956, Ridge was transferred to the Staff of the Commanding General at Norfolk where he served as the Assistant Chief of Staff G-2. A year later in 1957, he was assigned to the newly created billet of Deputy Chief of Staff for Doctrine and Development at Marine Corps Schools Quantico, Virginia. In 1961, he reestablished the office of the Naval Attaché at the American Embassy in Bogotà, Colombia, while simultaneously serving as the Naval Attaché and Naval Attaché for Air in Ecuador. Ridge retired in 1964, after over 25 years of service in the Marine Corps.

== Civilian career ==
After retirement Ridge served as a Department of Defense civilian employee for 14 years. Among his assignments was duty as the Assistant Director in the office of the Assistant Secretary for International Security Affairs. He received the Defense Meritorious Civilian Service Medal. Upon retirement from his civilian career he resided in Potomac, Maryland, later moving to California in 1995.

== Personal life ==
Thomas Ridge met his future wife while serving as a Naval Attaché in Brazil. The daughter of an official of the Brazilian Ministry of Finance, Helen Guarano de Barros would travel to the United States with Ridge upon the end of his tour in October 1944. On November 6, 1944 they were married in Miami, Florida. A week later, Ridge would report to San Diego for service overseas. Helen remained with his mother in Elgin, Illinois. She would later serve as a Navy Lieutenant Commander and gain her US citizenship in 1947.

They had two children: Karen Lee and Thomas Lee Jr.
