= List of Kappa Psi chapters =

Kappa Psi pharmaceutical fraternity is a professional pharmaceutical fraternity. It has academic, collegiate, and graduate chapters.

== Academic chapters ==
In the following list of early, "academic" chapters, formed at preparatory academies (~high schools) and Yale, all four closed before 1900. In this and the following tables, active chapters are indicated in bold and inactive chapters or schools are in italics.

| Chapter | Charter date and range | Institution | Location | Status | Ref. |
|---|---|---|---|---|---|
| Russell | May 30, 1879 – before 1894 | Russell Military Academy | New Haven, Connecticut | Inactive | |
| Cheshire | November 30, 1879 – before 1894 | Cheshire Military Academy | Cheshire, Connecticut | Inactive | |
| Hillhouse | October 7, 1894 – June 30, 1895 | Hillhouse Academy (now Hillhouse High School) | New Haven, Connecticut | Inactive | |
| Yale | 1896–c. 1895 | Yale College | New Haven, Connecticut | Inactive | |

== Collegiate chapters ==
In the following list of collegiate chapters, active chapters are indicated in bold and inactive chapters are in italics.

| Chapter | Charter date and range | Institution | Location | Status | Ref. |
|---|---|---|---|---|---|
| Alpha | December 10, 1895 – 1898 | Grand Council | | Inactive | |
| Beta | October 26, 1879 – 1913 | University College of Medicine | Richmond, Virginia | Merged | (Note: Beta chapter consolidated with Theta chapter in 1913.) |
| Gamma | November 18, 1898 – 1976 | Columbia University College of Pharmacy | New York City, New York | Inactive | (Note: Gamma chapter was organized by former members of Hillhouse chapter. It merged with the Beta chapter of Delta Omicron Alpha on November 17, 1917, as part of the national merger of the two fraternities.) (Note: Chapter closed because its related pharmacy school no longer exists.) |
| Delta | November 20, 1898 – January 15, 1925 | University of Maryland School of Medicine | Baltimore, Maryland | Inactive | (Note: Delta chapter was organized by former members of Hillhouse chapter. This became the Delta chapter of Theta Kappa Psi when the fraternity split into two groups in 1925.) |
| Epsilon first | 1901–1912 | Maryland Medical College | Baltimore, Maryland | Inactive | |
| **Epsilon** | April 30, 1928 | University of Minnesota | Minneapolis, Minnesota | Active | |
| Zeta | 1902–1906 | Georgetown University | Washington, D.C. | Inactive | (Note: Chapter's charter was revoked.) |
| Eta | 1903–2008 | Philadelphia College of Pharmacy | Philadelphia, Pennsylvania | Inactive | (Note: Eta chapter formed by absorbing the local group Delta Gamma Phi. It also merged with the Phi Zeta Delta fraternity of the Medio-Chirurgical College of Philadelphia on March 23, 1917, when the two colleges merged.) |
| **Theta** | 1904–1906; July 30, 1921 | Virginia Commonwealth University | Richmond, Virginia | Active | (Note: Chapter was founded at the Medical College of Virginia; its charter was revoked in 1906. The college later merged into Virginia Commonwealth and the chapter was re-established.) |
| Iota first | 1905 – January 15, 1925 | University of Alabama | Mobile, Alabama | Inactive | (Note: The university moved from Mobile to Tuscaloosa in 1920. The Iota chapter became the Iota chapter of Theta Kappa Psi when the fraternity split into two groups in 1925.) |
| Iota | November 29, 1927 | Medical University of South Carolina | Charleston, South Carolina | Inactive | |
| Kappa | 1906–June 1915 | Birmingham Medical College | Birmingham, Alabama | Inactive | (Note: Birmingham Medical College (BMC) closed in 1912. In October 1913, the Graduate Medical School of Alabama began operating in the former BMC facilities, allowing the remaining BMC students to graduate. This chapter went defunct when the last BMC students graduated in June 1915.) |
| Lamba first | 1907–1922 | Vanderbilt University Pharmacy School | Nashville, Tennessee | Inactive | (Note: The chapter went dormant when Vanderbilt's Pharmacy School was discontinued in 1922.) |
| **Lambda** | 1948 | Baylor University | Waco, Texas | Active | |
| Mu | 1907–xxxx ? | Massachusetts College of Pharmacy | Boston, Massachusetts | Inactive | |
| Nu first | 1907–1914 | Medical College of South Carolina | Charleston, South Carolina | Inactive | (Note: The chapter's charter was suspended because of state law.) |
| Nu second | 19xx ?–xxxx ? | University of Connecticut | Storrs, Connecticut | Inactive | |
| Xi first | 1908–1914 | West Virginia University | Morgantown, West Virginia | Inactive | |
| **Xi** | May 21, 1925 | Ohio State University | Columbus, Ohio | Active | |
| Omicron | 1908–1912 | University of Nashville | Nashville, Tennessee | Merged | (Note: The chapter was absorbed by Lambda chapter when the University of Nashvillediscontinued its pharmacy program.) |
| Pi first | 1908–19xx ? | Tulane University | New Orleans, Louisiana | Inactive | (Note: The Alpha chapter of Delta Omicron Alpha merged with this chapter in 1917 as part of the national merger of the two fraternities.) |
| **Pi** | June 11, 1928 | Purdue University | West Lafayette, Indiana | Active | |
| Rho first | 1909 – January 15, 1925 | Emory University, Atlanta Medical College | Atlanta, Georgia | Inactive | (Note: Chapter became the Rho chapter of Theta Kappa Psi when Kappa Psi split into two groups in 1925.) |
| **Rho** | April 23, 1932 | University of Kansas | Lawrence, Kansas | Active | |
| Sigma first | 1908–June 1915 | Baltimore College of Physicians & Surgeons | Baltimore, Maryland | Consolidated | (Note: Sigma chapter consolidated with Delta chapter when Baltimore College merged with the University of Maryland.) |
| **Sigma** | March 27, 1924 | University of Maryland, Baltimore | Baltimore, Maryland | Active | |
| Tau first | 1909–1912 | University of Alabama | Tuscaloosa, Alabama | Consolidated | (Note: Tau chapter merged with Iota chapter after the closure of the university's Preclinic School 1912.) |
| Tau | Bef. 1922–– January 15, 1925 | University of Southern California | Los Angeles, California | Inactive | (Note: When the fraternity split into two groups in 1925, this became the Tau chapter of Theta Kappa Psi.) |
| **Upsilon** | April 16, 1909 | University of Kentucky | Lexington, Kentucky | Active | (Note: Chapter formed at the Louisville College of Pharmacy by absorbing the local group Delta Gamma Phi. The Louisville College of Pharmacy merged with the University of Kentucky in 1947. However, the pharmacy school did not move from Louisville to Lexington until 1957.) |
| Phi | 1910–1920 | Northwestern University | Evanston, Illinois | Consolidated | (Note: Phi chapter formed by absorbing the Alpha chapter of Phi Gamma Sigma. It consolidated with the Chi chapter in 1920.) |
| **Chi** | January 25, 1910 | University of Illinois Chicago | Chicago, Illinois | Active | (Note: Chi chapter formed by absorbing the Beta chapter of Phi Gamma Sigma.) |
| Psi first | 1910–1914 | Baylor University | Waco, Texas | Inactive | (Note: Chapter's charter was suspended in 1914.) |
| **Psi** | November 17, 1917 – 19xx ?; October 9, 1925 | University of Tennessee | Knoxville, Tennessee | Active | (Note: Psi chapter formed by absorbing the Gamma chapter of Delta Omicron Alpha as part of the national merger of the two fraternities.) |
| Omega first | 1910–1915 | Southern Methodist University | Dallas, Texas | Inactive | (Note: Omega chapter formed by absorbing the local Kappa Lamba. However, it went inactive when the university discontinued its pharmacy school which was consolidated with Baylor University's medical school.) |
| Omega | 19xx ?–xxxx ? | Rutgers, The State University of New Jersey | Newark, New Jersey | Inactive | (Note: Chapter formed at the New Jersey College of Pharmacy by absorbing the local Spatula Club. The New Jersey College of Pharmacy later merged with Rutgers, The State University of New Jersey.) |
| Beta Beta | 1910–xxxx ? | Case Western Reserve University | Cleveland, Ohio | Inactive | (Note: Chapter formed at Western Reserve University which later merged to become Case Western Reserve University.) |
| **Beta Gamma** | September 23, 1910 | University of California, San Francisco | San Francisco, California | Active | |
| Beta Delta | 1910–19xx ? | Albany College of Pharmacy | Albany, New York | Inactive | (Note: Albany College of Pharmacy and Health Sciences is part of Union University.) |
| **Beta Epsilon** | May 17, 1911 | University of Rhode Island | Kingston, Rhode Island | Active | (Note: Chapter formed at the Rhode Island School of Physicians and Surgeons by absorbing the local Psi Beta. The school later became part of the University of Rhode Island.) |
| Beta Zeta | 1911–xxxx ? | Oregon State University | Corvallis, Oregon | Inactive | |
| Beta Eta first | 1912 – January 15, 1925 | Jefferson Medical College | Philadelphia, Pennsylvania | Inactive | (Note: When Delta Psi split into two groups in 1925, this became the Beta Eta chapter of Theta Kappa Psi.) |
| **Beta Eta** | May 16, 1925 | West Virginia University | Morgantown, West Virginia | Active | |
| Beta Theta first | 1913 – January 15, 1925 | University of Tennessee | Memphis, Tennessee | Inactive | (Note: When Delta Psi split into two groups in 1925, this became the Beta Theta chapter of Theta Kappa Psi.) |
| Beta Theta | 1926–19xx ? | Tulane University | New Orleans, Louisiana | Inactive | (Note: On November 17, 1917, the chapter merged with the Lambda chapter of Delta Omicron Alpha as part of the national merger of the two fraternities.) |
| Beta Iota | 1913–xxxx ? | North Pacific College of Oregon | Portland, Oregon | Inactive | |
| **Beta Kappa** | March 26, 1913 | University of Pittsburgh | Pittsburgh, Pennsylvania | Active | (Note: Chapter formed by absorbing the Beta chapter of Beta Phi Sigma.) |
| Beta Lamba first | 1913–19xx ? | George Washington University | Washington, D.C. | Inactive | |
| **Beta Lambda** | May 22, 1925 | University of Toledo | Toledo, Ohio | Active | |
| Beta Mu first | 1913– 19xx ? | University of Louisville Medical College | Louisville, Kentucky | Inactive | |
| Beta Mu | 1926–xxxx ? | Valparaiso University | Valparaiso, Indiana | Inactive | |
| **Beta Nu** | November 21, 1914 | Creighton University | Omaha, Nebraska | Active | |
| **Beta Xi** | May 1, 1915 | University of North Carolina at Chapel Hill | Chapel Hill, North Carolina | Active | |
| **Beta Omicron** | April 15, 1916 | University of Washington | Seattle, Washington | Active | (Note: Chapter formed by absorbing the local Beta Psi.) |
| **Beta Pi** | April 18, 1916 | Washington State University | Pullman, Washington | Active | (Note: Chapter formed by absorbing the local Sigma Gamma.) |
| Beta Rho first | November 17, 1917 – January 15, 1925 | Loyola University Chicago | Chicago, Illinois | Inactive | (Note: Chapter formed by absorbing the Theta chapter of Delta Omicron Alpha as part of a national merger of the two fraternities. In 1918, the chapter absorbed the Alpha Pi chapter and the Alpha Rho chapter of Phi Delta as part of another national merger. Delta Psi split into two groups in 1925; it became the Beta Rho chapter of Theta Kappa Psi.) |
| **Beta Rho** | April 19, 1926 | University of Mississippi | Oxford, Mississippi | Active | |
| Beta Sigma first | 1917–1919 | Fort Worth University School of Medicine | Fort Worth, Texas | Consolidated | (Note: Beta Sigma chapter formed by absorbing the Eta chapter of Delta Omicron Alpha as part of a national merger of the two fraternities. When Fort Worth University merged and moved in 1911, the chapter consolidated with the Psi chapter.) |
| **Beta Sigma** | April 25, 1924 | North Dakota State University | Fargo, North Dakota | Active | |
| Beta Tau | 1917–1920 | Marquette University School of Pharmacy | Milwaukee, Wisconsin | Inactive | (Note: Marquette's School of Pharmacy closed in 1920.) |
| Beta Upsilon first | January 26, 1918 – January 15, 1925 | Long Island College Hospital Medical School | Long Island, New York | Inactive | (Note: Chapter formed by absorbing the Alpha Alpha chapter of Phi Delta during a national merger of the two fraternities. When the fraternity split into two groups in 1925, it became Phi Delta chapter of Theta Kappa Psi.) |
| **Beta Upsilon** | February 27, 1930 | Butler University | Indianapolis, Indiana | Active | |
| Beta Phi first | 1918 – January 15, 1925 | University of Texas | Austin, Texas | Inactive | (Note: When Delta Psi split into two groups in 1925, this became the Beta Phi chapter of Theta Kappa Psi.) |
| **Beta Phi** | February 12, 1927 | University of Cincinnati | Cincinnati, Ohio | Active | |
| Beta Chi first | 1919 – January 15, 1925 | University of Cincinnati | Cincinnati, Ohio | Inactive | (Note: When Delta Psi split into two groups in 1925, this became the Beta Chi chapter of Theta Kappa Psi.) |
| **Beta Chi** | May 3, 1930 | Drake University | Des Moines, Iowa | Active | |
| **Beta Psi** | December 6, 1919 | University of Wisconsin–Madison | Madison, Wisconsin | Active | |
| Beta Omega first | 1920 – January 15, 1925 | Johns Hopkins University | Baltimore, Maryland | Inactive | (Note: When Delta Psi split into two groups in 1925, this became the Beta Omega chapter of Theta Kappa Psi.) |
| **Beta Omega** | May 22, 1930 | Temple University | Philadelphia, Pennsylvania | Active | |
| Gamma Gamma first | 1920 – January 15, 1925 | Columbia University College of Physicians & Surgeons | New York City, New York | Inactive | (Note: When Delta Psi split into two groups in 1925, this became the Gamma Gamma chapter of Theta Kappa Psi.) |
| Gamma Gamma | 19xx ?–xxxx ? | University of Texas at Austin | Austin, Texas | Inactive | |
| **Gamma Delta** | March 20, 1920 | Ohio Northern University | Ada, Ohio | Active | |
| **Gamma Epsilon** | March 20, 1920 | University of Nebraska Medical Center | Omaha, Nebraska | Active | |
| Gamma Zeta first | 1920 – January 15, 1925 | University of Toronto | Toronto, Ontario, Canada | Inactive | (Note: When Kappa Psi split into two groups in 1925, this became the Gamma Zeta chapter of Theta Kappa Psi.) |
| **Mu Omicron Pi** | May 14, 1927 | Wayne State University | Detroit, Michigan | Active | |
| **Gamma Zeta** | March 20, 1935 | Samford University | Homewood, Alabama | Active | |
| **Gamma Eta** | June 4, 1920 | University of Montana | Missoula, Montana | Active | |
| Gamma Theta first | 1920 – January 15, 1925 | Tufts University School of Medicine | Boston Massachusetts | Inactive | (Note: When Delta Psi split into two groups in 1925, this became the Gamma Theta chapter of Theta Kappa Psi.) |
| **Gamma Theta** | May 17, 1957 | University of Missouri–Kansas City | Kansas City, Missouri. | Active | |
| Gamma Iota | 1920–xxxx ? | State University of New York at Buffalo | Buffalo, New York | Inactive | |
| Gamma Kappa first | 1920 – January 15, 1925 | University of Georgia | Athens, Georgia | Inactive | (Note: When Delta Psi split into two groups in 1925, this became the Gamma Kappa chapter of Theta Kappa Psi.) |
| **Gamma Kappa** | October 17, 1958 | South Dakota State University | Brookings, South Dakota | Active | |
| Gamma Lamba first | 1920 – January 15, 1925 | University of Pennsylvania | Philadelphia, Pennsylvania | Inactive | (Note: When Delta Psi split into two groups in 1925, this became the Gamma Lambda chapter of Theta Kappa Psi.) |
| **Gamma Lambda** | October 25, 1958 | Northeastern University | Boston, Massachusetts | Active | |
| Gamma Mu first | 1921 – January 15, 1925 | University of Oregon | Eugene, Oregon | Inactive | (Note: When Delta Psi split into two groups in 1925, this became the Gamma Mu chapter of Theta Kappa Psi.) |
| Gamma Mu | 19xx ?–xxxx ? | University of Louisiana at Monroe | Monroe, Louisiana | Inactive | |
| Gamma Nu first | 1921 – January 15, 1925 | Harvard University | Cambridge, Massachusetts | Inactive | (Note: When Delta Psi split into two groups in 1925, this became the Gamma Nu chapter of Theta Kappa Psi.) |
| **Gamma Nu** | September 17, 1960 | University of the Pacific | Stockton, California | Active | |
| Gamma Xi first | 1922 – January 15, 1925 | Saint Louis University | St. Louis, Missouri | Inactive | (Note: When Delta Psi split into two groups in 1925, this became the Gamma Xi chapter of Theta Kappa Psi.) |
| **Gamma Xi** | May 13, 1961 | University of South Carolina | Columbia, South Carolina | Active | |
| **Gamma Omicron** | February 3, 1923 | University of Oklahoma | Norman, Oklahoma | Active | |
| Gamma Pi first | 1923 – January 15, 1925 | Wake Forest University | Winston-Salem, North Carolina | Inactive | (Note: When Delta Psi split into two groups in 1925, this became the Gamma Pi chapter of Theta Kappa Psi.) |
| **Gamma Pi** | March 19, 1946 | University of Health Sciences and Pharmacy in St. Louis | St. Louis, Missouri | Active | |
| Gamma Rho first | 1923 – January 15, 1925 | University of Arkansas | Fayetteville, Arkansas | Inactive | (Note: When Delta Psi split into two groups in 1925, this became the Gamma Rho chapter of Theta Kappa Psi.) |
| **Gamma Rho** | February 16, 1948 | University of New Mexico | Albuquerque, New Mexico | Active | |
| Gamma Sigma first | 1923 – January 15, 1925 | New York University and Bellevue Hospital Medical College | New York City, New York | Inactive | (Note: When Delta Psi split into two groups in 1925, this became the Gamma Sigma chapter of Theta Kappa Psi.) |
| **Gamma Sigma** | April 28, 1949 | University of Florida | Gainesville, Florida | Active | |
| Gamma Tau first | 1923 – January 15, 1925 | University of Manitoba | Winnipeg, Manitoba, Canada | Inactive | (Note: When Delta Psi split into two groups in 1925, this became the Gamma Tau chapter of Theta Kappa Psi.) |
| Gamma Tau | 19xx ?–1969 | George Washington University | Washington, D.C. | Inactive | |
| Gamma Upsilon first | 1924 – January 15, 1925 | Indiana University Bloomington | Bloomington, Indiana | Inactive | (Note: When Delta Psi split into two groups in 1925, this became the Gamma Upsilon chapter of Theta Kappa Psi.) |
| **Gamma Upsilon** | March 20, 1950 | University of Arizona | Tucson, Arizona | Active | |
| **Gamma Phi** | May 23, 1951 | University of Georgia | Athens, Georgia | Active | |
| **Gamma Chi** | May 6, 1953 | Ferris State University | Big Rapids, Michigan | Active | |
| **Gamma Psi** | March 6, 1953 | Mercer University | Macon, Georgia | Active | |
| **Gamma Omega** | May 28, 1955 | University of Arkansas for Medical Sciences | Little Rock, Arkansas | Active | |
| Delta Beta | March 13, 1963–January 7, 2025 | Southwestern Oklahoma State University | Weatherford, Oklahoma | Inactive | |
| **Delta Gamma** | February 24, 1963 | Auburn University | Auburn, Alabama | Active | |
| **Delta Delta** | March 28, 1963 | University of Houston | Houston, Texas | Active | |
| **Delta Epsilon** | February 24, 1967 | Duquesne University | Pittsburgh, Pennsylvania | Active | |
| **Delta Zeta** | December 12, 1968 | University of Iowa | Iowa City, Iowa | Active | |
| **Delta Eta** | March 17, 1972 | Xavier University of Louisiana | New Orleans, Louisiana | Active | |
| **Delta Theta** | March 25, 1973 | Texas Southern University | Houston, Texas | Active | |
| Delta Iota | June 6, 1975–October 2024 | Florida A&M University | Tallahassee, Florida | Inactive | |
| Delta Kappa | April 19, 1986- 111-25-2025 | Howard University | Washington, D.C. | Inactive | |
| **Delta Lambda** | April 23, 1988 | Campbell University | Buies Creek, North Carolina | Active | |
| **Delta Mu** | April 30, 1988 | University of British Columbia | British Columbia, Canada | Active | |
| **Delta Nu** | March 12, 1995 | Midwestern University | Downers Grove, Illinois | Active | |
| **Delta Xi** | September 13, 1997 | Shenandoah University | Winchester, Virginia | Active | |
| **Delta Omicron** | November 7, 1997 | Wilkes University | Wilkes-Barre, Pennsylvania | Active | |
| Delta Pi | November 14, 1997- July 16, 2025 | Texas Tech University | Lubbock, Texas | Inactive | |
| **Delta Rho** | November 14, 1998 | Nova Southeastern University | Davie, Florida | Active | |
| **Delta Sigma** | September 9, 2000 | Midwestern University-Glendale | Glendale, Arizona | Active | |
| **Delta Tau** | January 10, 2003 | Roseman University of Health Sciences | Henderson, Nevada | Active | |
| **Delta Upsilon** | May 3, 2003 | Palm Beach Atlantic University | West Palm Beach, Florida | Active | |
| **Delta Phi** | August 9, 2003 | University of California, San Diego | San Diego, California | Active | |
| **Delta Chi** | November 19, 2011 | University of New England College of Pharmacy | Biddeford, Maine | Active | |
| **Delta Psi** | July 10, 2005 | University of Minnesota Duluth | Duluth, Minnesota | Active | |
| **Delta Omega** | December 10, 2005 | South University | Savannah, Georgia | Active | |
| **Epsilon Beta** | April 12, 2008 | University of the Incarnate Word Feik School of Pharmacy | San Antonio, Texas | Active | |
| **Epsilon Gamma** | July 28, 2007 | Western University of Health Sciences | Pomona, California | Active | |
| **Epsilon Delta** | April 12, 2008 | Appalachian College of Pharmacy | Oakwood, Virginia | Active | |
| **Epsilon Epsilon** | August 23, 2008 | Irma Lerma Rangel College of Pharmacy | College Station, Texas | Active | |
| **Epsilon Zeta** | March 21, 2009 | East Tennessee State University | Johnson City, Tennessee | Active | |
| **Epsilon Eta** | March 28, 2009 | Lake Erie College of Osteopathic Medicine Bradenton School of Pharmacy | Bradenton, Florida | Active | |
| **Epsilon Theta** | October 24, 2009 | Sullivan University College of Pharmacy | Louisville, Kentucky | Active | |
| Epsilon Iota | June 27, 2009- December 11, 2025 | California Northstate University College of Pharmacy | Elk Grove, California | Inactive | |
| **Epsilon Kappa** | February 21, 2010 | Belmont University College of Pharmacy | Nashville, Tennessee | Active | |
| **Epsilon Lambda** | August 13, 2010 | Lipscomb University College of Pharmacy | Nashville, Tennessee | Active | |
| **Epsilon Mu** | November 12, 2010 | University of Florida College of Pharmacy | Orlando, Florida | Active | |
| **Epsilon Nu** | January 27, 2011 | University of Maryland Eastern Shore | Princess Anne, Maryland | Active | |
| **Epsilon Xi** | February 5, 2011 | Pacific University | Forest Grove, Oregon | Active | |
| Epsilon Omicron | May 7, 2011- January 21, 2026 | D'Youville University | Buffalo, New York | Inactive | |
| Epsilon Pi | November 12, 2011- May 12, 2025 | Idaho State University College of Pharmacy | Pocatello, Idaho | Inactive | |
| **Epsilon Rho** | January 28, 2012 | UIC College of Pharmacy at Rockford | Rockford, Illinois | Active | |
| Epsilon Sigma | 201x ?–20xx ? | University of Florida College of Pharmacy | St. Petersburg, Florida | Inactive | |
| Epsilon Tau | March 3, 2012 | Texas Tech University Health Sciences Center | Abilene, Texas | Inactive | |
| **Epsilon Upsilon** | March 31, 2012 | Roosevelt University | Chicago, Illinois | Active | |
| Epsilon Phi | 201x ?–20xx ? | South University | Columbia, South Carolina | Inactive | |
| **Epsilon Chi** | October 6, 2012 | University of Utah College of Pharmacy | Salt Lake City, Utah | Active | |
| **Epsilon Psi** | January 12, 2013 | University of Hawaii at Hilo | Hilo, Hawaii | Active | |
| **Epsilon Omega** | November 23, 2013 | Rosalind Franklin University of Medicine and Science | North Chicago, Illinois | Active | |
| Zeta Beta | February 1, 2014- May 9, 2025 | Husson University | Bangor, Maine | Inactive | |
| **Zeta Gamma** | February 8, 2014 | University of Florida College of Medicine-Jacksonville | Jacksonville, Florida | Active | |
| **Zeta Delta** | March 15, 2014 | University of South Florida | Tampa, Florida | Active | |
| **Zeta Epsilon** | May 3, 2014 | Northeast Ohio Medical University | Rootstown, Ohio | Active | |
| **Zeta Zeta** | May 25, 2014 | Touro College of Pharmacy | Manhattan, New York | Active | |
| **Zeta Eta** | September 6, 2014 | Regis University School of Pharmacy | Denver, Colorado | Active | |
| **Zeta Theta** | January 31, 2015 | Concordia University Wisconsin School of Pharmacy | Milwaukee, Wisconsin | Active | |
| Zeta Iota | March 7, 2015- February 2025 | University of St. Joseph School of Pharmacy | West Hartford, Connecticut | Inactive | |
| **Zeta Kappa** | May 2, 2015 | Marshall University School of Pharmacy | Huntington, West Virginia | Active | |
| **Zeta Lambda** | May 9, 2015 | University of North Texas Health Science Center College of Pharmacy | Fort Worth, Texas | Active | |
| **Zeta Mu** | June 13, 2015 | University of Missouri–Kansas City School of Pharmacy | Springfield, Missouri | Active | |
| Zeta Nu | June 27, 2015 – 202x ? | Arnold and Marie Schwartz College of Pharmacy | Brooklyn, New York | Inactive | |
| **Zeta Xi** | August 29, 2015 | South College School of Pharmacy | Nashville, Tennessee | Active | |
| **Zeta Omicron** | January 16, 2016 | Roseman University of Health Sciences | Henderson, Nevada | Active | |
| **Zeta Pi** | May 14, 2016 | St. John's University | New York City, New York | Active | |
| **Zeta Rho** | June 4, 2016 | Philadelphia College of Osteopathic Medicine School of Pharmacy | Suwanee, Georgia | Active | |
| Zeta Sigma | | California Health Sciences University | Clovis, California | Inactive | |
| **Zeta Tau** | January 6, 2017 | Chapman University School of Pharmacy | Orange, California | Active | |
| **Zeta Upsilon** | August 19, 2017 | Union University School of Pharmacy | Jackson, Tennessee | Active | |
| **Zeta Phi** | April 7, 2018 | Larkin University College of Pharmacy | Miami Gardens, Florida | Active | |
| Zeta Chi | May 12, 2018-March 25, 2025 | Phoenix Biomedical Campus | Phoenix, Arizona | Inactive | |
| Zeta Psi | 201x ?–20xx ? | Hampton University | Hampton, Virginia | Inactive | |
| Zeta Omega | February 23, 2019 | Cedarville University School of Pharmacy | Cedarville, Ohio | Inactive | |
| **Eta Beta** | June 4, 2022 | Texas Tech University Health Sciences Center at Dallas | Dallas, Texas | Active | |

== Graduate chapters ==
Graduate chapters were originally given Greek names, but that system was abandoned in favor of city names. In the following list of graduate chapters, active chapters are indicated in bold and inactive chapters are in italics.

| Chapter | Former chapter name | Charter date and range | Location | Status | Ref. |
|---|---|---|---|---|---|
| Philadelphia Graduate | Graduate Beta | 1907–xxxx ? | Philadelphia, Pennsylvania | Inactive | |
| **New York Graduate** | Graduate Gamma | February 2, 1908 | New York City, New York | Active | |
| Baltimore Graduate | Graduate Delta | 190x ?–xxxx ? | Baltimore, Maryland | Inactive | |
| **Birmingham Graduate** | Graduate Epsilon | 19xx ?–xxxx ?; November 7, 2012 | Birmingham, Alabama | Active | |
| Chicago Graduate | Graduate Zeta | 19xx ?–xxxx ? | Chicago, Illinois | Inactive | |
| **Boston Graduate** | Graduate Eta | May 17, 1912 | Boston, Massachusetts | Active | |
| **Albany Graduate** | Graduate Theta | March 10, 1913 | Albany, New York | Active | |
| **Providence Graduate** | Graduate Iota | June 25, 1913 | Providence, Rhode Island | Active | |
| **San Francisco Graduate** | Graduate Kappa | January 30, 1914 | San Francisco, California | Active | |
| **Cleveland Graduate** | Graduate Lambda | December 1, 1914 | Cleveland, Ohio | Active | |
| **Atlanta Graduate** | Graduate Mu | 191x ?–19xx ?; June 10, 1954 | Atlanta, Georgia | Active | |
| New Orleans Graduate | Graduate Nu | February 16, 1917 – xxxx ? | New Orleans, Louisiana | Inactive | |
| Mobile Graduate | Graduate Xi | 1917–xxxx ? | Mobile, Alabama | Inactive | |
| **Dallas Fort Worth Graduate** | Graduate Omicron | May 20, 1917 – xxxx ?; November 6, 2015 | Dallas-Fort Worth, Texas | Active | (Note: Chapter was originally formed as the Dallas Graduate chapter.) |
| **North Carolina Graduate** | Graduate Pi | 1917–19xx ?; October 7, 1978 | Durham, North Carolina | Active | |
| Washington Graduate | Graduate Rho | May 3, 1917 – xxxx ? | Washington, D.C. | Inactive | |
| Nashville Graduate | Graduate Sigma | May 16, 1917–xxxx ? | Nashville, Tennessee | Inactive | |
| Memphis Graduate | Graduate Tau | November 15, 1917 – xxxx ? | Memphis, Tennessee | Inactive | |
| Richmond Graduate | Graduate Upsilon | 1917–xxxx ? | Richmond, Virginia | Inactive | |
| **South Carolina Graduate** | Graduate Phi | 1917 | Columbia, South Carolina | Active | |
| Brooklyn Graduate | Graduate Chi | January 26, 1918 – xxxx ? | Brooklyn, New York City, New York | Inactive | (Note: Formed from the Brooklyn graduate chapter of Phi Delta, following the national merger of the two fraternities.) |
| **Portland Graduate** | Graduate Psi | April 27, 1918 | Portland, Oregon | Active | |
| Florida Graduate | Graduate Omega | 191x ?–xxxx ? | Jacksonville, Florida | Inactive | |
| **Kentucky Graduate** | Graduate Beta Beta | November 17, 1919 | Louisville, Kentucky | Active | |
| **West Virginia Graduate** | Graduate Beta Gamma | 191x ?–xxxx ? | Charleston, West Virginia | Active | |
| Illinois Graduate | Graduate Beta Delta | 191x ?–xxxx ? | Illinois | Inactive | |
| Mississippi Graduate | Graduate Beta Epsilon | 191x ?–xxxx ? | Mississippi | Inactive | |
| Huntington Graduate | Graduate Beta Zeta | 19xx ?–xxxx ? | Huntington, West Virginia | Inactive | |
| **Nebraska Graduate** | Graduate Beta Eta | December 19, 1920 | Omaha, Nebraska | Active | |
| Milwaukee Graduate | | 192x ?–xxxx ? | Milwaukee, Wisconsin | Inactive | |
| New Jersey Graduate | | 192x ?–xxxx ? | New Jersey | Inactive | |
| **Seattle Graduate** | | March 1, 1925 | Seattle, Washington | Active | |
| **Los Angeles Graduate** | | March 1, 1927 | Los Angeles, California | Active | |
| **Buffalo Graduate** | | April 14, 1930 | Buffalo, New York | Active | |
| **North Dakota Graduate** | | 193x ?–19xx ?; May 19, 1956 | Fargo, North Dakota | Active | |
| **Harrisburg Graduate** | | December 1, 1930 | Harrisburg, Pennsylvania | Active | |
| **Cincinnati Graduate** | | December 9, 1930 | Cincinnati, Ohio | Active | |
| **Connecticut Graduate** | | January 26, 1931 | New Haven, Connecticut | Active | |
| **Toledo Graduate** | | May 13, 1932 | Toledo, Ohio | Active | |
| **Pittsburgh Graduate** | | June 19, 1935 | Pittsburgh, Pennsylvania | Active | |
| **Detroit Graduate** | | May 13, 1937 | Detroit, Michigan | Active | |
| **Columbus Graduate** | | January 2, 1939 | Columbus, Ohio | Active | |
| **Saint Louis Graduate** | | March 24, 1949 | St. Louis, Missouri | Active | |
| **Wisconsin Graduate** | | June 17, 1949 | Madison, Wisconsin | Active | |
| **Arizona Graduate** | | March 20, 1953 | Tucson, Arizona | Active | |
| **Minnesota Graduate** | | April 13, 1953 | Minneapolis Minnesota | Active | |
| **District of Columbia Graduate** | | May 23, 1953 | Washington, D.C. | Active | |
| **Texas Graduate** | | April 3, 1955 | Austin, Texas | Active | |
| **Kansas City Graduate** | | September 26, 1963 | Kansas City, Missouri | Active | |
| **Pacific Graduate** | | December 15, 1965 | Stockton, California | Active | |
| **Louisiana Graduate** | | May 7, 1967 | Monroe, Louisiana | Active | |
| **Iowa Graduate** | | April 27, 1968 | Des Moines, Iowa | Active | |
| **Southwestern Graduate** | | October 18, 1969 | Weatherford, Oklahoma | Active | |
| **Maryland Graduate** | | October 2, 1971 | Baltimore, Maryland | Active | |
| **Illinois Graduate** | | January 19, 1974 | Chicago Illinois | Active | |
| **Ada Graduate** | | October 23, 1976 | Ada, Ohio | Active | |
| **Pocono Graduate** | | November 20, 1977 | Mountain Top, Pennsylvania | Active | |
| **Indiana Graduate** | | April 9, 1978 | West Lafayette, Indiana | Active | |
| **Virginia Graduate** | | February 28, 1982 | Richmond, Virginia | Active | |
| **Tennessee Graduate** | | April 23, 1983 | Memphis, Tennessee | Active | |
| **Central Michigan Graduate** | | October 24, 1992 | Big Rapids, Michigan | Active | |
| **Auburn Graduate** | | February 27, 1993 | Auburn, Alabama | Active | |
| **Montana Graduate** | | October 26, 1996 | Missoula, Montana | Active | |
| **Buies Creek Graduate** | | January 27, 1997 | Buies Creek, North Carolina | Active | |
| **Georgia Graduate** | | April 16, 2000 | Augusta, Georgia | Active | |
| **Tampa Graduate** | | November 18, 2006 | Tampa, Florida | Active | |
| **Southeast Florida-Bahamas Graduate** | | August 7, 2007 | Fort Lauderdale, Florida | Active | |
| **South Dakota Graduate** | | April 19, 2008 | Brookings, South Dakota | Active | |
| **Charleston Graduate** | | October 27, 2009 | Charleston, South Carolina | Active | |
| **Laurel Highlands Graduate** | | October 31, 2009 | Altoona, Pennsylvania | Active | |
| **Houston Graduate** | | February 27, 2010 | Houston, Texas | Active | |
| **Pomona Graduate** | | June 19, 2010 | Pomona, California | Active | |
| **Savannah Graduate** | | June 18, 2011 | Savannah, Georgia | Active | |
| **San Diego Graduate** | | June 25, 2011 | San Diego, California | Active | |
| **Athens Graduate** | | July 9, 2011 | Athens, Georgia | Active | |
| **Maine Graduate** | | July 15, 2011 | Portland, Maine | Active | |
| **Orlando Graduate** | | January 7, 2012 | Orlando, Florida | Active | |
| **New Mexico Graduate** | | February 8, 2014 | Albuquerque, New Mexico | Active | |
| **San Antonio Graduate** | | May 17, 2014 | San Antonio, Texas | Active | |
| **Idaho Graduate** | | July 19, 2014 | Boise, Idaho | Active | |
| **Maryland Eastern Shore Graduate** | | August 23, 2014 | Salisbury, Maryland | Inactive | |
| **South Carolina Upstate Graduate** | | April 25, 2015 | Greenville, South Carolina | Active | |
| **Gainesville Graduate** | | August 29, 2015 | Gainesville, Florida | Active | |
| **Jacksonville Graduate** | | February 6, 2016 | Jacksonville, Florida | Active | |
| **Palouse Graduate** | | April 16, 2016 | Palouse, Washington | Active | |
| **Nevada Graduate** | | October 22, 2016 | Las Vegas, Nevada | Active | |
| **Utah Graduate** | | December 17, 2016 | Salt Lake City, Utah | Active | |
| Hawaii Graduate | | March 3, 2017- March 19, 2025 | Honolulu Hawaii | Inactive | |
| **Charlotte Graduate** | | November 17, 2018 | Charlotte, North Carolina | Active | |
| **Vancouver Graduate** | | November 17, 2018 | Vancouver, British Columbia, Canada | Active | |
| **Northern Virginia Graduate** | | February 23, 2019 | Arlington, Virginia | Active | |
| **Denver Graduate** | | February 23, 2019 | Denver, Colorado | Active | |
| **Anaheim Graduate** | | September 17, 2022 | Anaheim, California | Active | |

== See also ==
- Delta Omicron Alpha
- Phi Delta (Medical)
- Professional fraternities and sororities
- Theta Kappa Psi
