= Phi Delta (medical) =

North American medical fraternity (1901–1918)

- ΦΔ
- The badge of Phi Delta, versioned for Alpha Pi chapter at Loyola of Chicago
- Founded: 1901; 125 years ago Long Island Hospital Medical College
- Type: Professional
- Affiliation: Independent
- Status: Merged
- Merge date: January 26, 1918
- Successor: Kappa Psi
- Emphasis: Medical
- Scope: North America
- Colors: Black and Gold
- Publication: Black and Gold
- Chapters: 16
- Members: 1,371 lifetime
- Headquarters: Long Island, New York; United States

Phi Delta Medical Fraternity (ΦΔ) was a North American professional fraternity from 1901 to 1918. This medical fraternity was established at Long Island Hospital Medical College and merged with Kappa Psi in 1918.

== History ==
Phi Delta Medical Fraternity was established in 1901 at the Long Island Hospital Medical College in Long Island, New York. This was called the Alpha Alpha chapter. The fraternity created a constitution and by-laws. It was overseen by a Grand Chapter.

In 1902, the Alpha Beta chapter opened at Ohio State University and the Alpha Gamma chapter at Albany College of Pharmacy at Union University in New York. Phi Delta became international in 1904 with the addition of Alpha Iota chapter at the University of Toronto in Canada. In total, sixteen chapters of Phi Delta formed between 1901 and 1912. Each chapter rented a chapter house.

Phi Delta held triennial conventions in Chicago or New York City. Its publication was called Black and Gold.

Phi Delta merged with the medical and pharmaceutical fraternity Kappa Psi on January 26, 1918. Before the merger, the fraternity had initiated 1,371 members.

== Symbols ==
The fraternity's badge was a monogram featuring the Greek letter "Φ" over the letter "Δ", with the chapter letters in the ring of the letter "Φ". Its colors were black and gold.

The Phi Delta flag was a black pennant with a red Geneva cross in the center; the fraternity's letters are on either side of the cross in gold.

== Chapters ==
Following is a list of the chapters of Phi Delta, with inactive chapters and institutions indicated in italics.

Chapter	Charter date and range	Institution	Location	Status	Ref.
Alpha Alpha	1901 – January 26, 1918	Long Island College Hospital Medical School	Long Island, New York	Merged	(Note: Alpha Alpha chapter merged with the Beta Upsilon chapter of Kappa Psi after the national merger of the two fraternities. When the fraternity split into two groups in 1924, it became Phi Delta chapter of Theta Kappa Psi.) (Note: Baird's 20th notes this school as a name change to what is now LIU, with the chapter listed as the predating establishment of the school by several decades. This appears to have been an error in Baird's (p. II-98). On another page (p. VIII-42) in the text describing Phi Delta the school is listed as Long Island Hospital Medical College, a small school that was linked on another WP page to a hospital that closed in 2012. The school, however, had a long history by then and became a unit of SUNY.)
Alpha Beta	1902–1913	Ohio State University	Columbus, Ohio	Withdrew (ΦΡΣ)	(Note: Chapter became the Omega chapter of Phi Rho Sigma fraternity.)
Alpha Gamma	1902 – January 26, 1918	Albany College of Pharmacy, Union University	Albany, New York	Merged	
Alpha Delta	1903 – January 26, 1918	Wisconsin College of Physicians & Surgeons	Milwaukee, Wisconsin	Merged	(Note: Wisconsin College of Physicians & Surgeons was purchased by Marquette University in 1913. The chapter became inactive when the college ceased operations.)
Alpha Epsilon	1903–1910	University Medical College	Kansas City, Kansas	Inactive	(Note: Chapter went defunct when University Medical School closed in 1910.)
Alpha Zeta	1903 – January 26, 1918	Washington University in St. Louis	St. Louis, Missouri	Merged	(Note: Although dormant, this chapter appears to have become the Beta Zeta chapter of Theta Kappa Psi, purhaps for the purposes of alumni affiliation.)
Alpha Eta	1903–1907	Michigan College of Medicine & Surgery	Detroit, Michigan	Inactive	(Note: The chapter went defunct when the school closed in 1907.)
Alpha Theta	1904–1909	Sioux City Medical College	Sioux City, Iowa	Inactive	(Note: Chapter went defunct when the Sioux City School of Medicine closed in 1909. It was absorbed by Kappa Psi during a national chapter merger but became the Beta Pi chapter of Theta Kappa Psi when that fraternity split into two groups in 1925.)
Alpha Iota	1904–1910	Toronto Medical College	Toronto, Ontario, Canada	Inactive	(Note: There are several similarly named medical schools in Canada. This seems the likely successor school.)
Alpha Kappa	1904–1911	Columbia University	New York City, New York	Inactive	
Alpha Lambda	1904–1908	Dearborn Medical College	Dearborn, Michigan	Inactive	(Note: This chapter went defunct when Dearborn Medical College closed.)
Alpha Mu	1904 – January 26, 1918	University of Minnesota	Minneapolis, Minnesota	Merged	
Alpha Nu	1905–1917	Chicago College of Medicine and Surgery	Chicago, Illinois	Consolidated	(Note: Alpha Nu chapter merged with Alpha Pi chapter when the Chicago College of Medicine and Surgery was purchased by Loyola University in 1917. Alpha Nu chapter reformed as the Beta Rho (first) chapter of Kappa Psi following a national merger of the two fraternities.)
Alpha Xi	1905 – January 26, 1918	Saint Louis University	St. Louis, Missouri	Merged	
Alpha Omicron	1906 – January 26, 1918	University of Illinois		Merged	
Alpha Pi	1912 – January 26, 1918	Loyola University Chicago	Chicago, Illinois	Merged	(Note: Alpha Pi chapter merged into the Beta Rho (first) chapter of Kappa Psi following a national merger of the two fraternities.)

== See also ==
- List of Kappa Psi chapters
- Phi Rho Sigma
- Professional fraternities and sororities
- Theta Kappa Psi
