= Omega Upsilon Phi =

International medical fraternity (1894–1934)

- ΩΥΦ
- Founded: November 15, 1894; 131 years ago University at Buffalo
- Type: Professional
- Former affiliation: PIC
- Status: Merged
- Merge date: 1934
- Successor: Phi Beta Pi
- Emphasis: Medicine
- Scope: North America
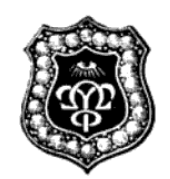
- Member badge
- Colors: Crimson and Gold
- Flower: Red carnation
- Publication: Omega Upsilon Phi Quarterly
- Chapters: 26
- Headquarters: United States

Omega Upsilon Phi (ΩΥΦ) was a professional medical fraternity founded at the University at Buffalo in 1894. It merged with Phi Beta Pi in 1934.

== History ==
Omega Upsilon Phi was founded at the University at Buffalo in Buffalo, New York on November 15, 1894 as a professional fraternity for medical students. Its founders were:

- Amos T. Baker
- John M. Garratt
- Frank O. Garrison
- Lawrence Hendee
- Henry Joslyn
- Elbert W. LaWall
- Ross G. Loop
- George H. Minard
- George S. Staniland
- Edward A. Southall
- Townsend Walker

Its publication was Omega Upsilon Phi Quarterly; it was first published in 1901. The fraternity was a member of the Professional Fraternity Association.

Omega Upsilon Phi went defunct in 1934 after merging with Phi Beta Pi medical fraternity.

== Symbols ==
Omega Upsilon Phi's badge was a shield with a monogram of the Greek letters ΩΥΦ below an eye. Its colors were crimson and gold. The fraternity's flower was the red carnation.

== Membership ==
Omega Upsilon Phi had four degrees in its ritualistic work; three secret undergraduate degrees and one open honorary degree known as the Hippocratic Degree. The latter was conferred by the grand chapter.

== Governance ==
Omega Upsilon Phi was governed through an annual conference called the Grand Chapter. The grand chapter consisted of three representatives from each chapter and the officers and past officers of the grand chapter.

== Chapters ==
Omega Upsilon Phi chartered 26 chapters. Inactive chapters and institutions are indicated in italics.

Chapter	Charter date and range	Institution	Location	Status	Ref.
Alpha	1894–1934	State University of New York School of Medicine & Biological Medical Science, Buffalo	Buffalo, New York	Withdrew, Merged (ΦΧ)	(Note: Became Omega Upsilon Phi chapter of Phi Chi rather than joining Phi Beta Pi as part of the national merger of the two fraternities.)
Beta First	1896–1899	Niagara University	Lewiston, New York	Consolidated	(Note: Merged into Alpha chapter when the medical department of Niagara University was absorbed by the University of Buffalo.)
Gamma	1897–1897; 1903–19xx ?	Union University	Albany, New York	Inactive	
Delta	1898	University of Colorado Denver	Denver, Colorado		
Epsilon	1899–19xx ?	University and Bellevue Hospital Medical College	New York City, New York	Inactive	
Zeta	1899–1903	University of Toronto	Toronto, Ontario, Canada	Inactive	
Eta	1900–1918	University of Colorado Boulder	Boulder, Colorado	Inactive	
Beta Second	1900–19xx ?	University of Cincinnati	Cincinnati, Ohio	Inactive	(Note: Chapter formed from Theta Nu Epsilon, a local fraternity.)
Theta	1901–19xx ?	Cornell University	New York City, New York	Inactive	
Iota	1901–19xx ?	Stanford University	Stanford, California	Inactive	(Note: Chapter formed from Phi Gamm Epsilon, a local fraternity.)
Theta Deuteron	1902–1910	Cornell University Medical School	Ithaca, New York	Inactive	(Note: Chapter went inactive when the Cornell Medical School closed.)
Kappa	1902–1913	Columbia University	New York City, New York	Inactive	
Lambda First	1903–1906	Miami Medical College	Cincinnati, Ohio	Inactive	(Note: Chapter closed when its school merged with the University of Cincinnati.)
Mu	1904–1912	Northwestern University	Evanston, Illinois	Inactive	
Nu	1905–1934	Medical College of Virginia	Richmond, Virginia	Merged (ΦΒΠ)	(Note: Merged with the Psi chapter of Phi Beta Pi with the national merger of the two fraternities.)
Xi	1905–19xx ?	University College of Medicine	Richmond, Virginia	Consolidated	(Note: Consolidated with the Nu chapter.)
Omicron	1907–1913	University of North Carolina at Chapel Hill	Chapel Hill, North Carolina	Inactive	
Pi	1908–1934	University of Pennsylvania	Philadelphia, Pennsylvania	Merged (ΦΒΠ)	(Note: Chapter formed from Kappa Phi fraternity.) (Note: Merged with the Alpha Sigma chapter of Phi Beta Pi with the national merger of the two fraternities.)
Rho	1908–1918	Jefferson Medical College	Philadelphia, Pennsylvania	Consolidated	(Note: Chapter consolidated with the Pi chapter.)
Sigma	1908–1912	University of Minnesota	Minneapolis, Minnesota	Inactive	(Note: Chapter formed from Kappa Delta Phi, a local fraternity at Hamline University when that institution merged with the medical school at the University of Minnesota.)
Tau	1908	North Carolina Medical College		Consolidated	(Note: Chapter consolidated with the Nu chapter.)
Upsilon First	1909–1918	Medico-Chirurgical College of Philadelphia	Philadelphia, Pennsylvania	Consolidated	(Note: Merged with Pi chapter when it school merged with the University of Pennsylvania.)
Phi	1911–1916	Vanderbilt University	Nashville, Tennessee	Inactive	(Note: Chapter formed form Delta Mu, a local fraternity.)
Chi	1912–1917	Fordham University	New York City, New York	Inactive	(Note: Chapter went defunct when the Medical School Closed.)
Psi	1913–19xx ?	University of Maryland	College Park, Maryland	Inactive	
Omega	1914–1934	University of California	Berkeley, California	Merged (ΦΒΠ)	(Note: Merged with the Alpha Tau chapter of Phi Beta Pi with the national merger of the two fraternities.)
Upsilon Second	1918–1934	Temple University School of Medicine	Philadelphia, Pennsylvania	Merged (ΦΒΠ)	(Note: Became the Beta Eta chapter of Phi Beta Pi with the national merger of the two fraternities.)
Lambda Second	1921–1934	Georgetown University	Washington, D.C.	Merged (ΦΒΠ)	(Note: Merged with the Chi chapter of Phi Beta Pi with the national merger of the two fraternities.)
Alpha Alpha	1922–1934	Saint Louis University	St. Louis, Missouri	Merged (ΦΒΠ)	(Note: Merged with the Lambda chapter of Phi Beta Pi with the national merger of the two fraternities.)
	19xx– >1928 ?	Ohio State University	Columbus, Ohio	Inactive	

== See also ==
- Professional fraternities and sororities
