= List of Phi Beta Pi chapters =

Phi Beta Pi is an American professional fraternity for medical students. It was established at the West Pennsylvania Medical College. in 1891. Currently, the fraternity operates as a local organization with one active chapter at the University of Texas Medical Branch at Galveston. In the following list, active chapters are indicated in bold and inactive chapters and institutions are italics.

Chapter	Charter date and range	Institution	Location	Status	Ref.
Alpha	March 10, 1891 – 19xx ?	West Pennsylvania Medical College (now University of Pittsburgh)	Pittsburgh, Pennsylvania	Inactive	
Beta	1898–1945	University of Michigan	Ann Arbor, Michigan	Inactive	
Gamma	1900–1905	Starling-Ohio Medical College	Columbus, Ohio	Inactive	
Delta	1901–19xx ?	University of Chicago	Chicago, Illinois	Inactive	(Note: Chapter was established at Rush Medical College, now the University of Chicago.)
Epsilon	1901–1908	McGill University	Montreal, Quebec, Canada	Inactive	
Zeta	1901–19xx ?	Baltimore College of Physicians and Surgeons	Baltimore, Maryland	Inactive	
Eta	1902–19xx ?	Jefferson Medical College	Philadelphia, Pennsylvania	Inactive	
Theta	1902–19xx ?	Northwestern University	Chicago, Illinois	Inactive	
Iota	1902–19xx ?	University of Illinois Chicago	Chicago, Illinois	Inactive	
Kappa	1903–19xx ?	Detroit College of Medicine	Detroit, Michigan	Inactive	
Lambda	1903–19xx ?	Saint Louis University	St. Louis, Missouri	Inactive	
Mu	1903–19xx ?	Washington University in St. Louis	St. Louis County, Missouri	Inactive	
Nu	1904–1913	Kansas City University	Kansas City, Kansas	Inactive	
Xi	1904–19xx ?	University of Minnesota	Minneapolis, Minnesota	Inactive	
Omicron	1905–1925	Indiana University	Indianapolis, Indiana	Consolidated	(Note: Omicron and Alpha Zeta merged to form Omicron Alpha Zeta chapter.)
Pi	1905–19xx ?	University of Iowa	Iowa City, Iowa	Inactive	
Rho	1906–1944	Vanderbilt University	Nashville, Tennessee	Inactive	
Sigma	1906–1920 ?	Medical College of Alabama	Mobile, Alabama	Inactive	(Note: College relocated to Tuscaloosa, Alabama in 1920.)
Tau	1906–19xx ?	University of Missouri	Columbia, Missouri	Inactive	
Upsilon	1906–1911	Western Reserve University	Cleveland, Ohio	Inactive	
Phi	1906–1913	University College of Medicine	Richmond, Virginia	Consolidated	(Note: Phi consolidated with Psi to form the Phi Psi chapter when the University College of Medicine merged into the Medical College of Virginia in 1915. Now part of Virginia Commonwealth University)
Chi	1906–1934	Georgetown University	Washington, D.C.	Inactive	
Psi	1906–1913	Medical College of Virginia	Richmond, Virginia	Consolidated	
Omega	1906–1912	Cooper Medical College	Stanford, California	Inactive	
Alpha Alpha	1907–19xx ?	Creighton Medical College	Omaha, Nebraska	Inactive	
Alpha Beta	1907–1929	Tulane University	New Orleans, Louisiana	Inactive	
Alpha Gamma	1907–1918	Syracuse University	Syracuse, New York	Inactive	
Alpha Delta	1907–1918	Medico-Chirurgical College	Philadelphia, Pennsylvania	Inactive	
Alpha Epsilon	1907–1942	Marquette University	Milwaukee, Wisconsin	Inactive	
Alpha Zeta	1908–1925	Indiana University Bloomington	Bloomington, Indiana	Consolidated	
Alpha Eta	1909–19xx ?	University of Virginia	Charlottesville, Virginia	Inactive	
Alpha Theta	1909–1913	University of Pennsylvania	Philadelphia, Pennsylvania	Inactive	
Alpha Iota	1910–1962	University of Kansas	Lawrence, Kansas	Inactive	(Note: Alpha Iota merged with Alpha Upsilon to create Alpha Iota Upsilon.)
**Alpha Kappa**	1910	University of Texas Medical Branch	Galveston, Texas	Active	(Note: This chapter continues under the name Phi Beta Pi, as the Beta Phi chapter, which it took at the national merger.)
Alpha Lambda	1912–19xx ?	University of Oklahoma College of Medicine	Oklahoma City, Oklahoma	Inactive	
Alpha Mu	1913–19xx ?	University of Louisville School of Medicine	Louisville, Kentucky	Inactive	
Alpha Nu	1913–19xx ?	University of Utah	Salt Lake City, Utah	Inactive	
Alpha Xi	1913–19xx ?	Harvard University	Cambridge, Massachusetts	Inactive	
Alpha Omicron	1913–19xx ?	Johns Hopkins University	Baltimore, Maryland	Inactive	
Phi Psi	1913-	Medical College of Virginia	Richmond, Virginia	Inactive	
Alpha Pi	1915–1953, 1960–1962	University of Wisconsin	Madison, Wisconsin	Inactive	
Alpha Rho	1916–1918	Oakland Medical College	Oakland, California	Inactive	
Alpha Sigma	1919–19xx ?	University of Pennsylvania	Philadelphia, Pennsylvania	Inactive	
Alpha Tau	1919–1936	University of California, Berkeley	Berkeley, California	Inactive	
Alpha Upsilon	March 20, 1920 –1962	University of Kansas School of Medicine	Rosedale, Kansas	Inactive	
Alpha Phi	April 5, 1920 – 19xx ?	Baylor University	Waco, Texas	Inactive	
Alpha Chi	April 19, 1920–19xx ?	University of Colorado		Inactive	
Alpha Psi	May 28, 1920 – 1939	University of Nebraska	Omaha, Nebraska	Inactive	
Alpha Omega	May 7, 1921 – 19xx ?	Loyola University	Chicago, Illinois	Inactive	
Beta Alpha	1922–19xx ?	West Virginia University	Morgantown, West Virginia	Inactive	
Beta Beta	1923–1934	Emory University	Atlanta, Georgia	Inactive	
Omicron Alpha Zeta	1925–19xx ?	Indiana University School of Medicine	Indianapolis, Indiana	Inactive	
Beta Gamma	1928–19xx ?	University of Tennessee	Knoxville, Tennessee	Inactive	
Beta Delta	1930–1938	University of Southern California	Los Angeles, California	Inactive	
Beta Epsilon	1931–1938	Duke University	Durham, North Carolina	Inactive	
Beta Zeta	1933–19xx ?	Louisiana State University	Baton Rouge, Louisiana	Inactive	
Beta Eta	1934–19xx ?	Temple University	Philadelphia, Pennsylvania	Inactive	
Beta Theta	1938–19xx ?	University of Arkansas	Fayetteville, Arkansas	Inactive	
Beta Iota	1947–1953	University of Washington	Seattle, Washington	Inactive	
Beta Kappa	1947–19xx ?	Hahnemann Medical College	Philadelphia, Pennsylvania	Inactive	
Beta Lambda	1948–19xx ?	University of North Dakota	Grand Forks, North Dakota	Inactive	
Beta Mu	1950–1954	Chicago Medical School	North Chicago, Illinois	Inactive	
Beta Nu	1955–19xx ?	University of Oregon	Eugene, Oregon	Inactive	
Beta Xi	1955–19xx ?	University of Miami	Coral Gables, Florida	Inactive	
