= Theta Kappa Psi =

American professional medicine fraternity

- ΘΚΨ
- Badge of Theta Kappa Psi
- Founded: May 30, 1879; 147 years ago Russell Military Academy
- Type: Professional
- Affiliation: Independent
- Former affiliation: PFA; PIC
- Status: Active
- Emphasis: Medical
- Scope: Local (formerly International)
- Colors: Green and Gold
- Flower: Red rose
- Publication: The Messenger
- Chapters: 1
- Headquarters: 515 Post Office St; Galveston, Texas 77550-5501; United States
- Website: Theta Kappa Psi homepage

Theta Kappa Psi Medical Fraternity, Incorporated (ΘΚΨ) is a North American professional medical fraternity. As of 2025, it operates as an independent local fraternity with one active chapter.

== History ==
=== Kappa Psi ===
The Society of Kappa Psi was founded on May 30, 1879, at the Russell Military Academy, a prep school in New Haven, Connecticut. The founder was F. Harvey Smith. The second chapter was established at the Cheshire Military Academy in Cheshire, Connecticut on November 30, 1879. A third chapter was established at Hillhouse High School in New Haven, Connecticut on October 7, 1894. All three prep school chapters had dissolved by the mid-1890s.

The Society Kappa Psi was reorganized into Kappa Psi Fraternity on November 18, 1898, at the School of Medicine at the University of Maryland by former members of the Society of Kappa Psi. Leaders of this reorganization effort, now with a collegiate focus, were:

- William C. Bennett
- Perry L. Boyer
- William F. Clark
- James E. Cathill
- Edwin J. Frosher
- Thompson D. Gilbert
- J. Dawson Reeder
- Press W. Ethridge
- F. Harvey Smith

Kappa Psi started as a medical and pharmaceutical fraternity with chapters chartered in both medical and pharmacy schools and colleges. The fraternity absorbed the Delta Omicron Alpha medical fraternity on November 17, 1917. (Note: Theta Kappa Psi would name this as its Pi chapter, dating to 1908.) On January 26, 1918, the fraternity absorbed the small national Phi Delta medical fraternity, adding eleven active chapters.

=== Theta Kappa Psi ===
At the 1924 Grand Council convention of Kappa Psi, the decision was made to separate the fraternity into two separate entities: one fraternity for medicine and one fraternity for pharmacy. The split was effective on January 15, 1925. The pharmacy fraternity retained the Greek name Kappa Psi, and the medical fraternity became Theta Kappa Psi. The fraternities both used May 30, 1879, as their date of founding.

The new fraternity assumed the name of Theta Kappa Psi Medical Fraternity, believing that the addition of the Greek letter Theta greatly enhanced its ritualistic significance. It adopted a constitution, ritual, coat of arms, insignia, badge, and pledge button. Its new constitution gave the national president the title of Grand Prytan, the national vice-president the title of Grand Vice-Prytan, and the Grand Secretary and Treasurer the titles of Grand Recorder and Bursar. The fraternity's quarterly journal was The Messenger.

Theta Kappa Psi Medical Fraternity began with 32 chapters. Four of these 32 chapters included both medical and pharmacy students. Nine of its 32 chapters were inactive. Within a short time, the revised ritual and constitution, along with the necessary forms, records, and updated charters were issued to the chapters.

Initially, the fraternity found progress very difficult since there were at least five strong national medical fraternities as competition. Also, many of the strong leaders of Kappa Psi were associated with pharmacy schools and had remained with the original fraternity.

The first officers of Theta Kappa Psi Medical Fraternity were:

- Ralph C. Williams, Grand Prytan
- Jabex H. Elliott, Grand Vice-Prytan
- A. Richard Bliss, Jr., Grand Recorder and Bursar
- Victor J. Anderson, Grand Registrar, and Editor
- Thomas Benton Sellers, Grand Counselor

Incorporation papers were filed for Theta Kappa Psi by Dr. M.I. Samuels, Delta chapter, Wilmington, Delaware; Dr. C. J. Harbordt, Epsilon chapter, Dover, Delaware; and W.O. Klienstuber, Beta Eta chapter, Wilmington, Delaware, on May 6, 1926. The incorporation was completed on May 7, 1926.

Following the reorganization, the Delta chapter struggled. The chapter depended upon transfers from other schools instead of working for themselves. The chapter also lacked leadership. It was necessary to withdraw the charter in 1930. Delta had furnished more Grand Officers than any other chapter and had always been the leader among chapters.

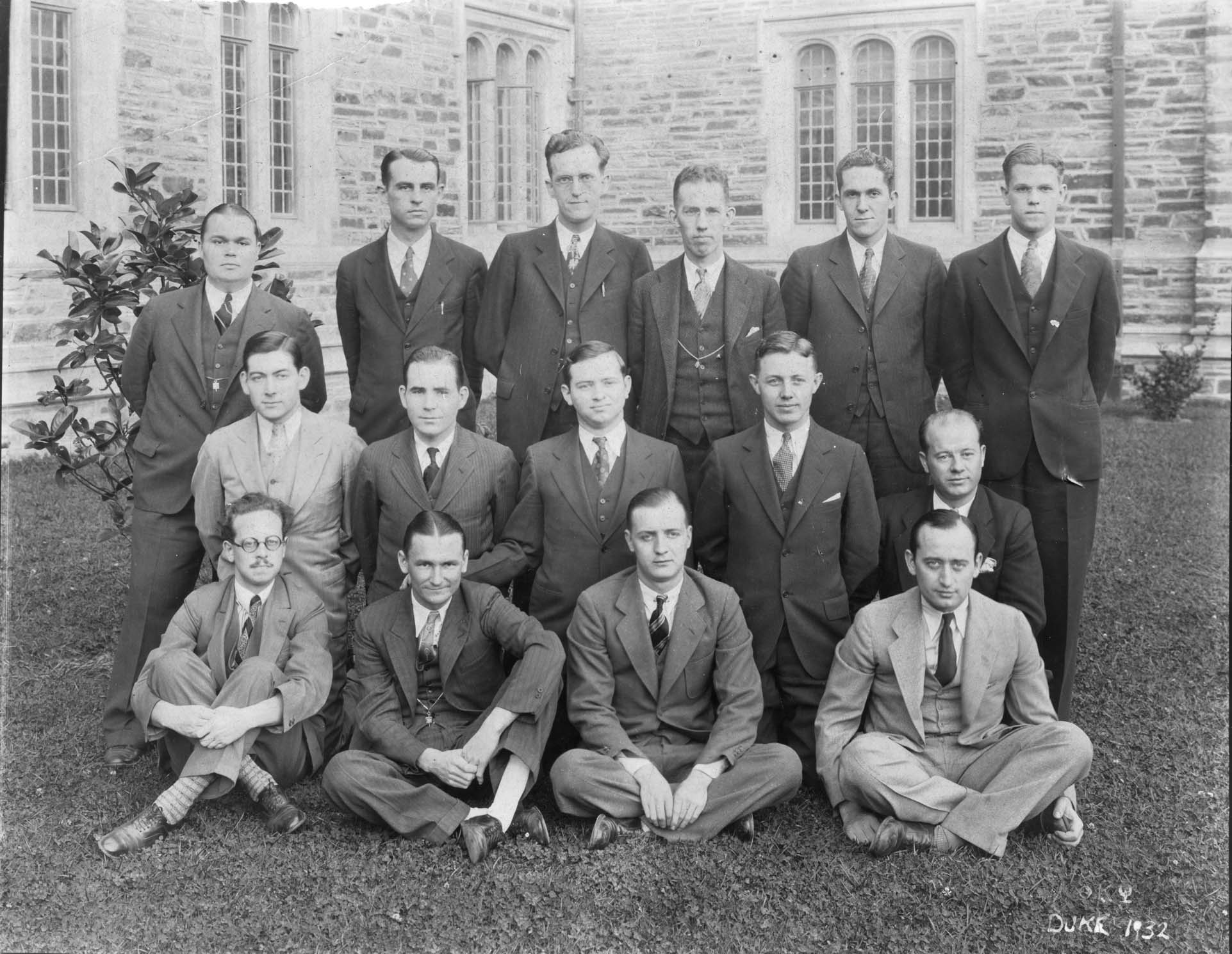
Beta Kappa chapter at Duke University, 1932.

The zenith of Theta Kappa Psi Medical Fraternity was in 1933. The national officers were Grand Prytan R.C. Williams; Grand Vice-Prytan J.H. Elliott; and Grand Recorder and Bursar A.G. Engelbach. With their leadership, the fraternity was weathering the Great Depression and had 35 collegiate and 25 graduate chapters. The year ended with an international convention in Atlantic City, New Jersey on December 27 through December 29, 1933.

Between 1935 and 1940, Theta Kappa Psi lost eleven chapters. By 1940, the fraternity had dropped to sixth place among national medical fraternities in the number of undergraduate chapters. The problems confronting Theta Kappa Psi were not unique, for two other national medical fraternities, Phi Alpha Sigma, and Alpha Mu Pi Omega also disappeared during the period. When World War II ended in 1945, Theta Kappa Psi comprised only twelve collegiate chapters.

In 1955, R.C. Williams chartered Mu Upsilon chapter in Miami, the first new collegiate chapter granted since 1944. Beta Epsilon chapter at Ohio State University was reactivated. The apparent rebirth of Theta Kappa Psi, however, was short-lived. By the fall of 1959, Theta Kappa Psi's chapter roll had dropped to six. Several frustrated national officers began negotiations with representatives of Phi Beta Pi Medical Fraternity for a merger.

=== Merger with Phi Beta Pi ===
The last national convention of Theta Kappa Psi convened on March 11, 1961, at the McAllister Hotel in Miami, Florida. During the meeting, a motion was made to merge with Phi Beta Pi Medical Fraternity and the motion passed. Theta Kappa Psi Fraternity, as a distinct national entity, passed into history.

Theta Kappa Psi was officially invited to merge with Phi Beta Pi upon the condition that Theta Kappa Psi would surrender its name, rolls, and treasury to the national Phi Beta Pi office in Pittsburgh, Pennsylvania. Chapters would be allowed to add the prefix Theta to their chapter designation. These conditions were accepted. Both fraternities were allowed to maintain certain of their original identification features.

The two Texas chapters of Theta Kappa Psi—Beta Phi chapter in Galveston and Psi chapter in Dallas—did not accept the merger. The thought of sacrificing the fraternity's name, history, and tradition was considered untenable to them. In the wake of this disgruntlement, the two Texas chapters and the Gamma Tau chapter at the University of Manitoba wrote a new constitution and named the seceding organization Theta Kappa Psi International Medical Fraternity. Legal action threatened by Phi Beta Pi concerning the use of the name, caused no meetings [in support of the possible schism] to be held after 1962.

The surviving chapters of Theta Kappa Psi followed diverse courses. Beta Epsilon chapter at Ohio State University continued as an independent local fraternity until 1964 when poor finances caused it to fold. Psi chapter at the University of Texas Southwestern Medical Center pledged members until 1968 as a local independent fraternity. Gamma Tau chapter at the University of Manitoba continued as an independent local fraternity until it became inactive in 1968. Beta Eta chapter at Jefferson Medical College in Philadelphia was an active chapter in Phi Beta Pi until 1966. At that time, the chapter lost all formal structure when it allowed non-members to live in its fraternity house.

In the 1960s, the Beta Phi chapter at the University of Texas Medical Branch emerged as the largest medical fraternity chapter in the nation with 130 members; it was operating as a local independent fraternity. The ritual, revised from the previous national initiation ceremony, was strictly followed. Gamma Kappa chapter at the Medical College of Georgia affiliated with Phi Beta Pi after the merger. In the 1960s, this chapter was extremely successful and built a new fraternity house in 1966. Although listed as a chapter of Phi Beta Pi, the group considered itself a member of Theta Kappa Psi.

In the spring of 1992, the merger of Phi Beta Pi and Theta Kappa Psi was dissolved. At the time of closing, there were nine active chapters in existence. Of the 59 chapters installed by Theta Kappa Psi, the Gamma Kappa chapter at the Medical College of Georgia was the last to remain active.

== Symbols ==
Theta Kappa Psi adopted a new coat of arms, insignia, badge, and pledge button. The badge and coat of arms were designed by Richard Bliss. The badge is a black enamel shield with a raised gold caduceus at its center. Above the caduceus are the Greek letters ΘΚΨ. At each of the three corners of the shield, there is a small emerald; the border of the badge may be jeweled. The insignia and pledge button were designed by R.C. Williams.

The fraternity's colors are gold and green. Its flower is the red rose.

== Chapters ==
The fraternity had both collegiate and graduate chapters. Following is a list of Theta Kappa Psi collegiate chapters. Active chapters are indicated in bold. Inactive chapters are in italic.

| Number | Chapter | Charter date and range | Institution | Location | Status | Ref. |
|---|---|---|---|---|---|---|
| 1. | Alpha | 1879–xxxx ? | Grand Chapter | | Inactive | (Note: After Kappa Psi's first reorganization, its Alpha chapter would remain akin to a Grand Chapter of alumni leaders and not be associated with a specific school.) |
| 2. | Mu Sigma Alpha | 1900–1940 | University of Michigan | Ann Arbor, Michigan | Inactive | |
| 3. | Delta | 1898–1931 | University of Maryland, College Park | College Park, Maryland | Inactive | |
| 4. | Beta | 1900–1913 | Medical College of Virginia | Richmond, Virginia | Inactive | |
| 5. | Chi | 1901–1916 | University of Illinois | Urbana, Illinois | Inactive | |
| 6. | Epsilon | 1901–1914 | Maryland Medical College | Baltimore, Maryland | Inactive | (Note: Maryland Medical College ceased operations in 1914.) |
| 7. | Phi Delta | 1901–1950 | Long Island College of Medicine, now SUNY | Brooklyn, New York | Inactive | |
| 8. | Zeta | 1902–1942 | Georgetown University | Washington, D.C. | Inactive | |
| 9. | Beta Epsilon | 1903–1943, 1960–1964 | Ohio State University | Columbus, Ohio | Inactive | |
| 10. | Beta Pi | 1905–1904 | Sioux City Medical | Sioux City, Iowa | inactive | (Note: Sioux City Medical ceased operations in 1909.) |
| 11. | Beta Xi | 1905–1910 | University Medical Cornell ? | Ithaca, New York | Inactive | |
| 12. | Beta Zeta | 1905–1912 | Washington University in St. Louis | St. Louis, Missouri | Inactive | |
| 13. | Gamma | 1905–19xx ? | Albany Medical College | Albany, New York | Inactive | |
| 14. | Gamma Eta | 1905–1907 | Michigan M & S | Detroit, Michigan | Inactive | (Note: Michigan M & S merged into Saginaw Valley State University in 1907.) |
| 15. | Iota | 1905–1920 | University of Alabama School of Medicine | Tuscaloosa, Alabama | Inactive | (Note: School moved from Mobile to Tuscaloosa in 1920.) |
| 16. | Kappa | 1906–1913 | Birmingham Medical College | Birmingham, Alabama | Inactive | (Note: Birmingham Medical College ceased operations in 1913.) |
| 17. | Lambda | 1907–1919 | Vanderbilt University | Nashville, Tennessee | Inactive | |
| 18. | Nu | 1907–1914 | Medical University of South Carolina | Charleston, South Carolina | Inactive | |
| 19. | Kappa Phi | 1908–19xx ? | University of Minnesota | Minneapolis, Minnesota | Inactive | |
| 20. | Omicron | 1908–1911 | University of Nashville | Nashville, Tennessee | Inactive | (Note: The University of Nashville closed in 1911.) |
| 21. | Pi | 1908–19xx ? | Tulane University | New Orleans, Louisiana | Inactive | |
| 22. | Xi | 1908–1914 | West Virginia University | Morgantown, West Virginia | Inactive | |
| 23. | Rho | 1909–1953 | Emory University | Atlanta, Georgia | Inactive | |
| 24. | Sigma | 1909–1915 | Baltimore P & S | Baltimore, Maryland | Inactive | (Note: Baltimore P & S merged with the University of Maryland in 1915.) |
| 25. | Tau | 1909–1942 | University of Southern California | Los Angeles, California | Inactive | (Note: Baird's 20th says "USC". Assuming this is the school in California and not the University of South Carolina.) |
| 26. | Omega | 1910–1915 | Southern Methodist University | University Park, Texas | Inactive | (Note: Southern Methodist University closed in 1915.) |
| 27. | Psi | 1910–19xx ? | Southwestern Medical | Dallas, Texas | Inactive | (Note: Baird's lists this as "Southwestern Medical". This may have been the school that merged into Southern Methodist in 1911, but that school is noted as closing its medical school in 1915.) |
| 28. | Beta Eta | 1912–1966 | Jefferson | Philadelphia, Pennsylvania | Inactive | |
| 29. | Beta Lambda | 1913–19xx ? | George Washington University | Washington, D.C. | Inactive | |
| 30. | Beta Mu | 1913–19xx ? | University of Louisville | Louisville, Kentucky | Inactive | |
| 31. | Beta Theta | 1913–1943 | University of Tennessee | Knoxville, Tennessee | Inactive | |
| 32. | Upsilon | 1915–1939 | University of North Carolina at Chapel Hill | Chapel Hill, North Carolina | Inactive | |
| 33. | Beta Rho | 1917–19xx ? | Loyola University Chicago | Chicago, Illinois | Inactive | |
| 34. | Beta Sigma | 1917–1918 | Ft. Worth Medical | Fort Worth, Texas | Inactive | (Note: Fort Worth Medical closed in 1918.) |
| 35. | Beta Tau | 1917–1924 | Marquette University | Milwaukee, Wisconsin | Inactive | |
| 36. | **Beta Phi** | 1917–Present | University of Texas Medical Branch | Galveston, Texas | Active | (Note: This chapter continues under the name Phi Beta Pi.) |
| 37. | Beta Chi | 1919–1928 | University of Cincinnati | Cincinnati, Ohio | Inactive | |
| 38. | Gamma Delta | 1919–1924 | University of Wisconsin–Madison | Madison, Wisconsin | Inactive | |
| 39. | Beta Omega | 1920–1926 | Johns Hopkins University | Baltimore, Maryland | Inactive | |
| 40. | Gamma Gamma | 1920–19xx ? | Columbia University | New York City, New York | Inactive | |
| 41. | Gamma Kappa | 1920–19xx ? | University of Georgia | Chicago, Illinois | Inactive | |
| 42. | Gamma Theta | 1920–1928 | Tufts University | Medford, Massachusetts | Inactive | |
| 43. | Gamma Zeta | 1920–1940 | University of Toronto | Toronto, Ontario, Canada | Inactive | |
| 44. | Gamma Lambda | 1921–1929 | University of Pennsylvania | Philadelphia, Pennsylvania | Inactive | |
| 45. | Gamma Mu | 1921–1949 | University of Oregon | Eugene, Oregon | Inactive | |
| 46. | Gamma Nu | 1921–19xx ? | Harvard University | Cambridge, Massachusetts | Inactive | |
| 47. | Gamma Xi | 1922–1929 | St. Louis | St. Louis, Missouri | Inactive | |
| 48. | Gamma Pi | 1923–19xx ? | Wake Forest University | Winston-Salem, North Carolina | Inactive | |
| 49. | Gamma Rho | 1923–1949 | University of Arkansas | Fayetteville, Arkansas | Inactive | |
| 50. | Gamma Sigma | 1923–19xx ? | NYU and Bellevue Hospital Medical College | New York City, New York | Inactive | |
| 51. | Gamma Tau | 1923–1968 | University of Manitoba | Winnipeg, Manitoba, Canada | Inactive | |
| 52. | Gamma Upsilon | 1924–1944 | Indiana University Bloomington | Bloomington, Indiana | Inactive | |
| 53. | Beta Gamma | 1926–19xx ? | University of Mississippi | Oxford, Mississippi | Inactive | |
| 54. | Eta | 1928–1930 | Rush Medical College | Chicago, Illinois | Inactive | |
| 55. | Beta Nu | 1929–1944 | McGill University | Montreal, Quebec, Canada | Inactive | |
| 56. | Beta Kappa | 1930–19xx ? | Duke University | Durham, North Carolina | Inactive | |
| 57. | Beta Iota | 1931–1943 | Louisiana State University | Baton Rouge, Louisiana | Inactive | |
| 58. | Phi | 1931–19xx ? | Northwestern University | Evanston, Illinois | Inactive | |
| 59. | Gamma Phi | 1942–1950 | Baylor University | Waco, Texas | Inactive | |

== See also ==
- Professional fraternities and sororities
- List of Kappa Psi chapters
