= Toyin Tofade =

Nigerian-American academic

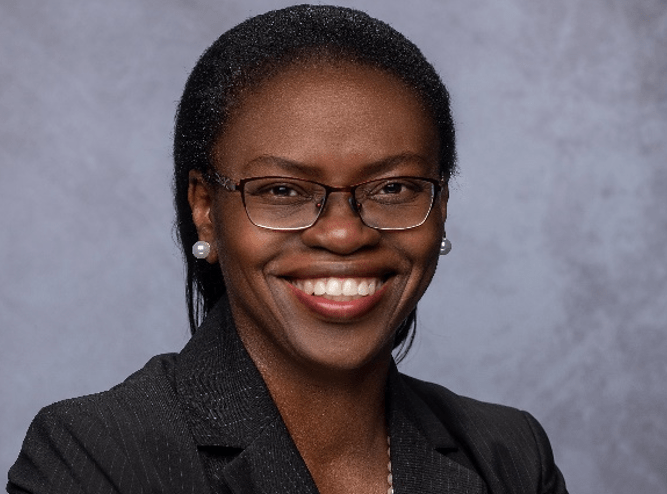
- Picture of Toyin Tofade

10th President of Albany College of Pharmacy and Health Sciences
- In office July 1, 2022 – July 1, 2026

Personal details
- Education: Obafemi Awolowo University | University of North Carolina
- Awards: Wake Area Health Education Center Mentor of the Year

Toyin Tofade is an academic administrator who was the 10th president of Albany College of Pharmacy and Health Sciences from 2022 to 2026 and was the first Black woman to hold that position.

== Education ==
She obtained a bachelor's degree in pharmacy from Obafemi Awolowo University in Ile-Ife, Nigeria, a master's degree in pharmacy practice in 1994 and a Doctor of Pharmacy (PharmD) in 1997 from UNC Eshelman School of Pharmacy at the University of North Carolina at Chapel Hill.

== Academic career ==
From 2016 to 2022, Tofade served as Dean and professor at the Howard University College of Pharmacy in Washington, D.C.

From 2022 to 2026, Tofade was the 10th and final president of Albany College of Pharmacy and Health Sciences as an independent institution which is mergering with Russell Sage College. She currently holds the title of President Emeritus.

== Recognition ==
In 2020, she was appointed president-elect of the International Pharmaceutical Federation (FIP) academic pharmacy section, making her the first female black woman to be named an FIP fellow. She was also named chair-elect of the council of deans for the American Association of Colleges of Pharmacy that year.

In 2022, Tofade was awarded the Donald Francke Medal by the American Society of Hospital Pharmacists for "significant international contributions to advance pharmacy practice."
