= Kappa Psi =

North American pharmaceutical fraternity

- ΚΨ
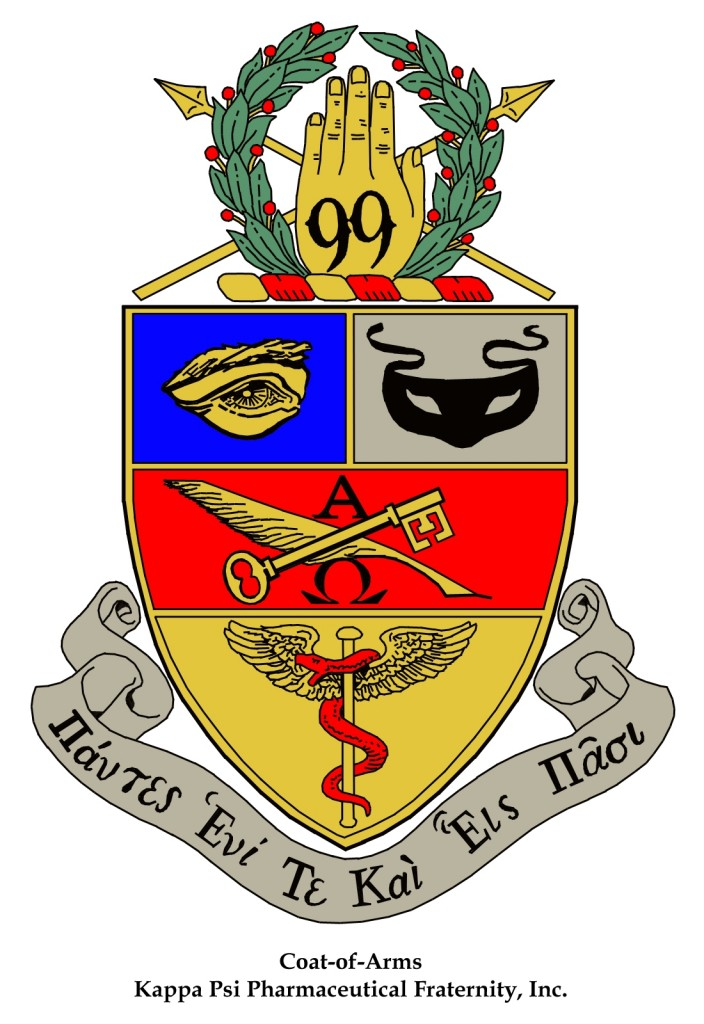
- Founded: May 30, 1879; 147 years ago Russell Military Academy
- Type: Professional
- Affiliation: PFA
- Former affiliation: PIC
- Status: Active
- Emphasis: Pharmacy
- Scope: North America
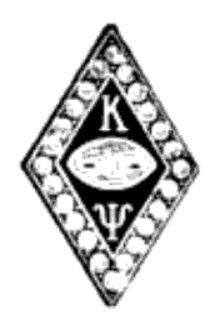
- Member badge
- Colors: Scarlet and Cadet gray
- Flower: Red carnation
- Publication: The Mask
- Chapters: 97 collegiate, 72 graduate
- Headquarters: 8100 Penn Ave S, Suite 189; Bloomington, Minnesota 55431; United States
- Website: kappapsi.org

Kappa Psi Pharmaceutical Fraternity, Incorporated (ΚΨ) is the largest professional pharmaceutical fraternity in the world with more than 6,000 student members and more than 87,000 alumni members. It was founded in 1879 at Russell Military Academy in New Haven, Connecticut as the Society of Kappa Psi.

== History ==
The Society of Kappa Psi was founded on May 30, 1879, at the Russell Military Academy in New Haven, Connecticut as an academic society for college preparatory schools. The society's founder was Franklin Harvey Smith. An additional chapter was formed at the Cheshire Military Academy in Cheshire, Connecticut in 1879. While these two early units failed, another chapter formed at Hillhouse Academy of New Haven, Connecticut in 1894. Hillhouse too, died as a chapter on 30 June 1895.

However, the founders of these chapters, many having graduated and entered college, sought a collegiate level re-establishment of the order. Representatives, now alumni without an active chapter from these three early prep school chapters formed a grand chapter called Alpha chapter on December 10, 1895, deeming it an essential step for rebuilding the fraternity and for expansion nationally. These men, reforming the organization as Kappa Psi Fraternity chartered its first collegiate chapter, Delta, at the University of Maryland in the fall of 1898 when former members of the Hillhouse chapter entered that school in the study of medicine. Others, who had opted for the study of pharmacy, formed a Gamma chapter at the College of Pharmacy at Columbia University in that same year. A third group of advancing students formed the Beta chapter at the University College of Medicine in Richmond, Virginia, in 1900. Its first national convention was held in New York City in 1900.

By 1902 the young organization had formed six chapters and already held four conventions. In 1903 the Society incorporated as a national fraternity, operating jointly as both a medical and pharmaceutical fraternity. On November 17, 1917, the fraternity merged with Delta Omicron Alpha fraternity. It merged with Phi Delta on January 26, 1918.

By mutual agreement, in 1924, the fraternity split into Kappa Psi, which retained its pharmacy component, and Theta Kappa Psi, which became strictly a medical fraternity. Theta Kappa Psi later struggled; it would go on to merge with Phi Beta Pi in 1961, but this union was again dissolved in 1992. A single chapter carries on the Theta Kappa Psi name today.

Kappa Psi Fraternity would later be incorporated under the name of Kappa Psi Pharmaceutical Fraternity. In 1977, Kappa Psi first welcomed women into the fraternity.

Today there are 97 active collegiate chapters and 72 graduate chapters across the United States, Canada, and the Bahamas, and over 80,000 people have been initiated into the fraternity since its inception. The Central Office of Kappa Psi is located in Richardson, Texas.

== Symbols ==
Kappa Psi's colors are scarlet and cadet gray. Its flower is the red carnation. Its publication is The Mask.

== Activities ==
Kappa Psi holds its international convention biennially.

Provinces updated as of August 1, 2012

1. . Atlantic Province: Northern Georgia, North Carolina, Northeast South Carolina, Eastern Tennessee, and Southern Virginia
2. . Great Lakes Province: Kentucky, Michigan, Ohio, and the Toronto peninsula of Ontario, Canada
3. . Gulf Coast Province: Alabama, Arkansas, Louisiana, Mississippi, and Middle/Western Tennessee
4. . Mid-America Province: Illinois, Indiana, Kansas, and Missouri
5. . Mountain East Province: Delaware, the District of Columbia, Maryland, Western New York, Western Pennsylvania, Northern Virginia, and West Virginia
6. . Northeast Province: Connecticut, Maine, Massachusetts, New Hampshire, New Jersey, Eastern New York, Eastern Pennsylvania, Rhode Island, and Vermont
7. . Northern Plains Province: Iowa, Minnesota, Nebraska, North Dakota, South Dakota, Wisconsin, and Wyoming
8. . Northwest Province: Alaska, Idaho, Montana, Oregon, Utah, Washington, and the Province of British Columbia, Canada
9. . Pacific West Province: Arizona, California, Hawaii, and Nevada
10. . Southeast Province: Florida, Southern Georgia, Southeast South Carolina, and the commonwealths of the Bahamas and Puerto Rico
11. . Southwest Province: Colorado, New Mexico, Oklahoma, and Texas

== Chapters ==
As of January 2026, Kappa Psi consists of 97 collegiate and 72 graduate chapters organized into eleven regional provinces.

== Notable members ==
- Leasure K. Darbaker, bacteriologist and professor of pharmacognosy and bacteriology at the Pittsburgh College of Pharmacy
- John Shostak, Connecticut House of Representatives and Mayor of Norwalk, Connecticut
- R. C. Williams, assistant surgeon general with the U.S. Public Health Service, with rank of rear admiral

== See also ==
- Professional fraternities and sororities
- Rho Chi, pharmacy honor society
