= Wilmer Ingalls Gordon =

American physician

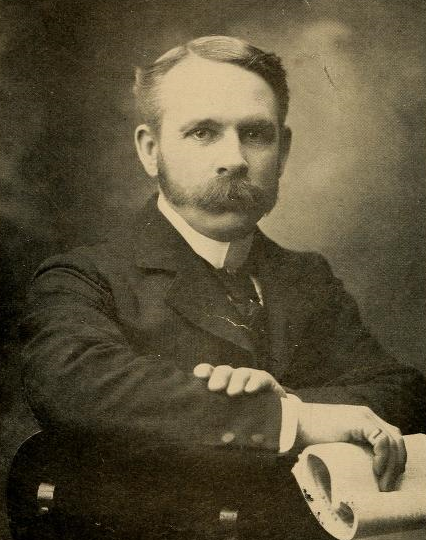
- Born: February 14, 1860; Mullica Hill, New Jersey, U.S.
- Died: March 7, 1943 (aged 83); Cleveland, Ohio, U.S.
- Occupations: Osteopathic physician, writer

Wilmer Ingalls Gordon (14 February 1860 – 7 March 1943) was an American osteopathic physician and vegetarianism activist.

== Biography ==
Gordon was born on February 14, 1860, in Mullica Hill, New Jersey. He was educated at the medical department of Union University in Albany, New York and the College of Physicians and Surgeons of Maryland. Gordon obtained his M.D. from the Union University in Albany in 1887. He studied at the Chicago School of Osteopathy and practiced medicine in New York City. He became a member of the New York State Medical Society in 1900 and was Vice-President of the Columbia County, New York, Medical Society.

He moved to Cleveland in 1900 and became President of the Progressive Osteopathic and Suggestive Therapeutic Society in Ohio. He also practiced as a physician and surgeon at Copake Iron Works. When he was forty, Gordon suffered a nervous breakdown, travelled widely and lost faith in medicine. Gordon founded the National School of Manual, Physical and Suggestive Therapeutics, which practiced naturopathy. He was President of the School for more than thirty-two years and taught thousands of students. He founded the Electine Food Remedy Company in Ontario. Gordon advocated natural health practices without medication. He authored books on New Thought and vegetarianism.

At the age of seventy-two, Gordon suffered severe internal injuries from a street car accident. Doctors gave him only thirty days to live but he survived another eleven years, whilst his wife cared for him. He authored the book How to Live 100 Years, and was convinced he would make this age until his injuries from the accident.

Gordon was an anti-vaccinationist. He was President of the Cleveland Physical Culture Society, which attempted to force the Cleveland Health Board to abandon vaccination. His book Suggestion and Osteopathy (1901), was negatively reviewed by medical experts. His views on osteopathic treatment for certain diseases were described in a review as non-scientific and "do not commend themselves to us as rational or well proven".

=== Vegetarianism ===
Gordon was a vegetarian and believed that "alcohol, tobacco, and flesh food was the trinity of all existing evil for mankind". He founded the vegetarian organization, Food Reform Society of America. The Encyclopedia of American Biography noted that Gordon is "one of the pioneer vegetarian advocates of the United States".

== Death ==
Gordon died on 7 March 1943, in Cleveland, Ohio. He was survived by his wife Eleanore and son Wilmer Jr.

== Publications ==
- I Suggest: Suggestion and Osteopathy (1901)
- How to Live 100 Years: Or, the New Science of Living (1903)
- The New Force (1903)

== See also ==
- List of vegetarians
