= R. C. Williams =

American physician (1888–1984)

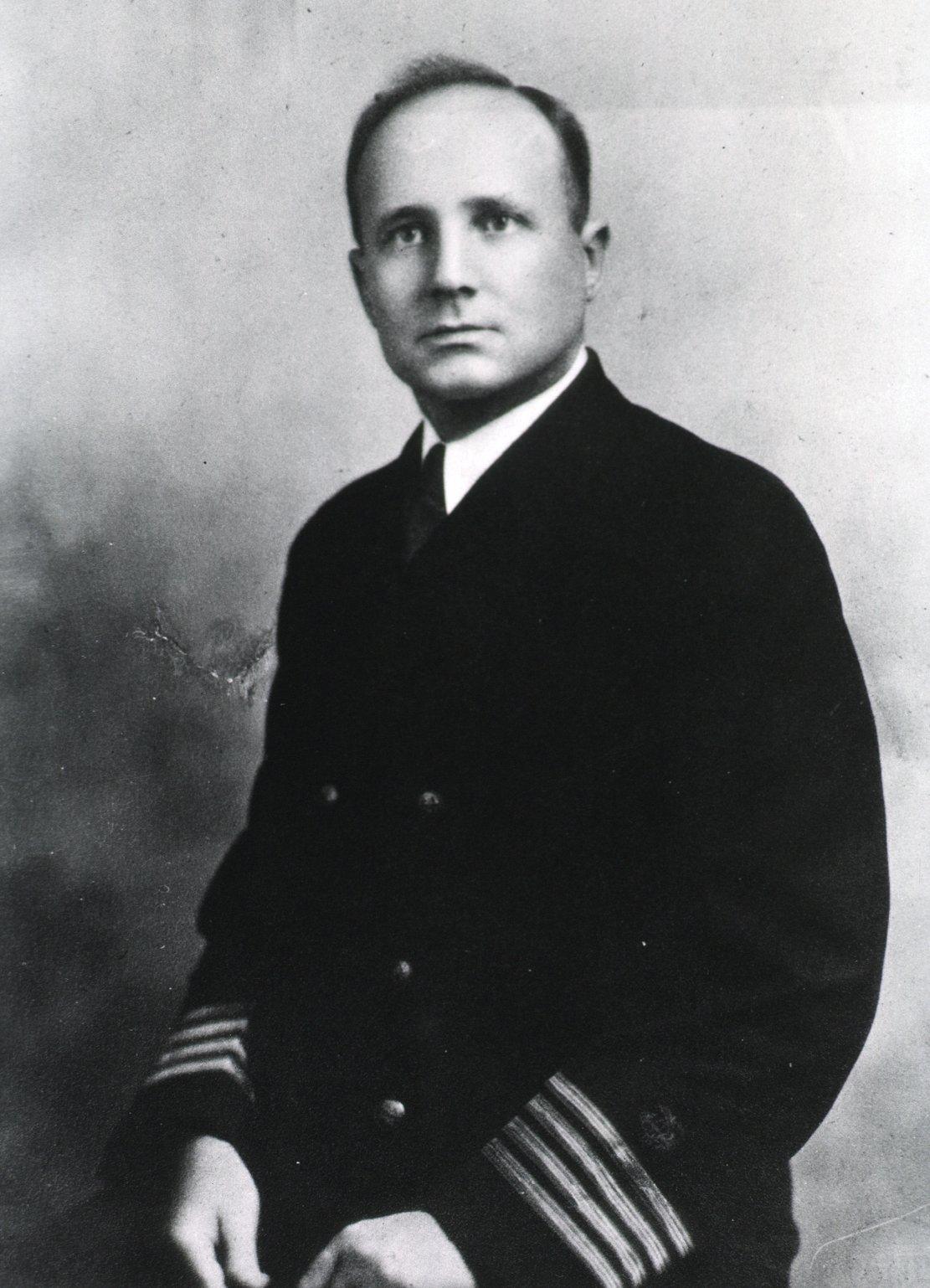
- R. C. Williams, Assistant Surgeon General in the U.S. Public Health Service
- Born: July 24, 1888; Russell County, Alabama
- Died: December 29, 1984 (aged 96); Albuquerque, New Mexico
- Military career
- Allegiance: United States of America
- Branch: U.S. Public Health Service
- Service years: 1917–1951
- Rank: Rear Admiral
- Commands: Assistant Surgeon General, U.S. Public Health Service

Ralph Chester Williams (July 24, 1888 – December 29, 1984) was an Assistant Surgeon General with the U.S. Public Health Service, with rank of rear admiral. He also served as the national president of Tau Kappa Epsilon and Theta Kappa Psi fraternities.

== Early life and education ==
Williams was born in Russell County, Alabama, on July 24, 1888, to parents Arthur R. Williams and Susan (Tatum) Williams. He graduated from Alabama Polytechnic Institute in Auburn in 1907 with a bachelor of science degree in chemistry and metallurgy. He earned his M.D. degree in 1910 from the Medical College of Alabama in Mobile. During his medical studies, he was initiated into Iota chapter of Theta Kappa Psi medical and pharmaceutical fraternity on November 7, 1907. Williams married Annie Worrill Perry on February 26, 1913.

== Career ==
Williams began his career in private family practice. From July 1910 to 1914, Williams was engaged in private practice in Madison and Russell counties in Alabama. In early 1914, he joined Alabama State health Department as an epidemiologist. He served in that role for almost three years, resigning in October 1916 to prepare for examination for entrance into the U.S. Public Health Service.

On March 26, 1917, Williams was commissioned as an assistant surgeon in the regular commissioned corps of the U.S. Public Health Service. From 1936 to 1942 he was assigned as chief medical officer of the Farm Security Administration. In December, 1943, he was appointed Assistant Surgeon General of the U.S. Public Health Service, with rank of rear admiral, in charge of the Bureau of Medical Services. In that position, he was in charge of all Public Health Service hospitals.

Williams authored The United States Public Health Service, 1798–1950, which was published in 1951, the year he retired from the Public Health Service.

After retiring from the Public Health Service, Williams served for eight years as director of the Division of Hospital Services for the state of Georgia. He also taught hospital administration at the University of Georgia campus in Atlanta.

== Fraternity leadership ==
In 1924, R.C. Williams played a key role in the separation of Kappa Psi Medical and Pharmaceutical Fraternity into two separate fraternities: Theta Kappa Psi medical fraternity and Kappa Psi pharmaceutical fraternity. After the organization made plans to separate, Williams designed the pledge pin and insignia of the new Theta Kappa Psi. Williams was also elected national president of the new Theta Kappa Psi fraternity in 1924. He also served as editor of the fraternity's magazine, and he was recognized as a leader in expansion efforts for Theta Kappa Psi.

Williams was initiated into Tau Kappa Epsilon by the Alpha-Pi chapter at George Washington University in November 1938. Charles Rudolph Walgreen Jr. was serving as the national vice-president (Grand Epiprytanis) of TKE at the time Walgreen Jr. assumed the role of president of Walgreens upon his father's death in 1939. As a result of the increased business pressures, Walgreen resigned in 1943 from his office in TKE, and Williams was elevated to the position vacated by Walgreen. National president (Grand Prytanis) Charles E. Nieman was also forced to resign in 1944 due to pressures from other business activities. As a result, Williams was appointed to the Grand Prytanis position on March 23, 1944. Under the leadership of Williams, by 1949 TKE was able to reactive all but four chapters that were inactive during the war, as well add 28 new chapters and expand its footprint into the Southern United States.

== Personal life ==
Williams died on December 29, 1984, in Albuquerque, New Mexico. He had moved there six years prior.
