= Phi Rho Sigma =

American medical fraternity

- ΦΡΣ
- Founded: Oct 31, 1890; 136 years ago Northwestern University
- Type: Professional
- Affiliation: Independent
- Former affiliation: PFA
- Status: Active
- Emphasis: Medical
- Scope: National (formerly International)
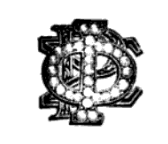
- Member badge
- Colors: Scarlet and Old Gold
- Publication: The Journal of Phi Rho Sigma
- Chapters: 10 active, 47 chartered
- Headquarters: Phi Rho Sigma Medical Society, P.O. Box 162; Westerville, Ohio 43086-0162; United States
- Website: www.phirhosigma.org

Phi Rho Sigma Society (ΦΡΣ) is a co-educational medical fraternity founded by medical students at Northwestern University in 1890.

== History ==
Phi Rho Sigma Medical Fraternity was founded at the Chicago Medical College (now Northwestern University Feinberg School of Medicine) on October 31, 1890. Its founder was Milbank Johnson, along with, H. H. Forline, J. A. Poling, and T. J. Robeson. Johnson became the fraternity's first president and designed its badge.

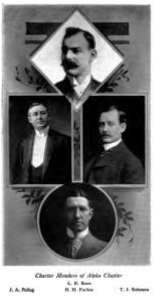
Charter members of Phi Rho Sigma

The fraternity expanded to include Beta chapter at the University of Illinois in the fall of 1894 and Gamma chapter at the University of Chicago in the fall of 1895. Alpha chapter offer saw the general affairs of the fraternity until 1896 when a grand chapter was formed. The grand chapter consisted of three members from each chapter who were elected annually. The grand chapter could issue charters and enact laws.

In response to the addition of new chapters, the fraternity adopted a revised constitution on March 20, 1899, which specified that the grand chapter would meet biennially and would consist of two delegates from each chapter. Its first general convention was held in Chicago on July 3, 1899 through July 5, 1899. Conventions have been held as of 1920 biennially. Between conventions, the executive power of the fraternity is vested in a grand council composed of seven members who all reside in the same vicinity.

The fraternity's periodical, Phi Rho Sigma Journal, began in January 1900. Its first editor was Dr. T. B. Swartz of the Alpha chapter; he served in this capacity for four years. The Iota chapter also published a magazine called The Iota for many years.

At the grand chapter meeting in July 1901, the constitution was amended to allow alumni chapters. The Chicago Alumni chapter was chartered on November 5, 1901. Its founders were Dr. E. W. Andrews, Dr. Charles M. Gleason, Dr. Frank Jay, Dr. Mortimer Frank, and Dr. D. E. W. Wenstrand.

At the grand council meeting of February 20, 1908, the various chapters were divided into districts that were overseen by district managers. The five districts included Eastern (Lambda), Erie (Kappa, Nu, Phi, Rho, Sigma, Skull and Septre, Upsilon, and Zeta), Chicago (Alpha, Beta, Gamma, Omicron, and Pi), Mississippi (Eta, Theta, Iota, Mu, and Tau), and Pacific (Delta).

On April 17, 1911, Phi Rho Sigma absorbed Alpha Omega Delta, a former national fraternity that had a remaining chapter at the University of Buffalo. The new chapter was allowed to keep the name Alpha Omega Delta because of its history.

On April 6, 1929, the authorities of Chi Zeta Chi fraternity signed an agreement in Cincinnati to merge into Phi Rho Sigma. By 1936, the fraternity had 27 active collegiate chapters and eighteen alumni chapters. At the time, its membership had grown to 19,050 members.

In 1960, the grand chapter established national awards in the form of gold medals that are given at the biennial meeting.

- The Irving S. Cutter Medal is awarded to members for extraordinary service to the field of medicine.
- The Jesse Ansley Griffin Medal is presented to members for outstanding service to society. The medal was named for the founder of Chi Zeta Chi.
- The Paul McLain Student Research Award is given to student members for significant research while in medical school. McLain was a physician and scientist dedicated his life to teaching medical students. This award comes with a medal and a cash award. Recipients also present their research at the grand chapter.
- Certificates of Meritorious Service are also awarded by the grand chapter.

In 1973, the fraternity changed its name to Phi Rho Sigma Medical Society and started accepting women as members.

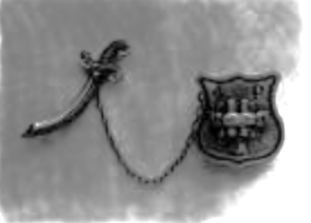
Phi Rho Sigma oringal badge

== Symbols ==
Phi Rho Sigma's colors are gold and scarlet. Its badge was originally a gold shield with the letters Φ, Ρ and Σ in black enamel, surrounding a raised pair of clasped hands in gold over an open book in gold. The Φ was in the upper left-hand corner, the Ρ in the upper right-hand corner, and the Σ below at the apex of the shield.

At the grand chapter meeting on December 2, 1896, the badge was updated to a monogram design submitted by Gamma chapter. The modified badge consists of the letters Φ, Ρ, and Σ as a gold monogram outline, with Φ on a separate plane above the other two letters, set in pearls.

== Chapters ==
=== Collegiate chapters ===
The chapter roll for Phi Rho Sigma is as follows. Some names reflect the chapter's origin as a previous local fraternity. The Chi series of chapters resulted from the merger with Chi Zeta Chi. These chapters originated as part of Chi Zeta Chi, were the only active chapter of the two fraternities at the time of the merger, or were a Chi Zeta Chi chapter that was older than the Phi Rho Sigma chapter at the same institution. Chapters that are active are indicated in bold; inactive chapters and institutions are indicated in italic.

Chapter	Chartered/Range	Institution	Location	Status	References
**Alpha**	October 31, 1890	Northwestern University	Evanston, Illinois	Active	
Beta	November 24, 1894 – 1969	University of Illinois Urbana-Champaign	Champaign and Urbana, Illinois	Inactive	(Note: Merged with Gamma chapter in 1936.)
Gamma	October 16, 1895 – 1969	University of Chicago	Chicago, Illinois	Inactive	(Note: Gamma chapter formed by absorbing a local group named The Ancient Order of Ananias, established in 1993 at Rush Medical College (later the University of Chicago). The chapter merged with the Beta chapter in 1936.)
Delta	1896–1919, 19xx–1969	University of Southern California	Los Angeles, California	Inactive	
Epsilon	February 20, 1897 – 1965	Wayne State University School of Medicine	Detroit, Michigan	Inactive	(Note: Chapter was formed by absorbing Mu Kappa Phi, established in 1890, at the Detroit College of Medicine and Surgery which became Wayne University in 1934 and Wayne State University in 1956.)
**Zeta**	May 29, 1897	University of Michigan Medical Department	Detroit, Michigan	Active	
**Eta**	March 3, 1900 – 1973; 19xx ?	Creighton University Medical College	Omaha, Nebraska	Active	(Note: Chapter formed by absorbing a local group named Gamma Sigma, established in 1898)
**Eta Tau**		Creighton University	Phoenix, Arizona	Active	
Theta (see **Theta Tau**)	April 28, 1900 – 1907	Hamline University Medical School	Saint Paul, Minnesota	Consolidated	(Note: This chapter formed by absorbing the local group The Hamline Medical Fraternity, established in 1898. When Hamline's Medical School merged with the medical department of the University of Minnesota in 1907, Theta and Tau chapters were consolidated to form Theta Tau chapter.)
Iota first (see Iota Alpha, Iota Beta and **Iota**)	March 2, 1901 – 1902	Omaha Medical College	Omaha, Nebraska	Inactive	(Note: Chapter formed by absorbing the local group Lambda Pi.) (Note: In 1902, the Omaha Medical College became a medical department of the University of Nebraska Lincoln, with the first two years of study being at Lincoln and the last two years at Omaha. As a result, the Iota chapter divided into the Iota Alpha chapter at Lincoln and the Iota Beta chapter at Omaha. These two chapters were later re-consolidated as Iota chapter at the University of Nebraska Lincoln.)
Kappa	April 2, 1901 – xxxx ?	Case Western Reserve University	Cleveland, Ohio	Inactie	
Lambda (see Lambda Phi)	May 3, 1901 – 1916	Medico-Chirurgical College of Philadelphia	Philadelphia, Pennsylvania	Consolidated	(Note: Chapter formed by absorbing a local group named A n T (Alpha Pi Upsilon). Later, it merged with Chi chapter to form Lambda Chi chapter.)
**Mu**	February 12, 1902	University of Iowa Medical Department	Iowa City, Iowa	Active	(Note: Chapter formed by absorbing a local group named Delta Sigma.)
Nu	April 30, 1902 – 1923	Harvard Medical School	Cambridge, Massachusetts	Inactive	(Note: Chapter was formed by absorbing the local group, Society of the Interest of Medical Research, established on April 7, 1902.)
Iota Alpha (see Iota first and **Iota**)	1902–1968	University of Nebraska–Lincoln	Lincoln, Nebraska	Consolidated	
Iota Beta (see Iota first and **Iota**)	1902–1968	University of Nebraska Omaha	Omaha, Nebraska	Consolidated	
Xi	1903–1904	Johns Hopkins University	Baltimore, Maryland	Inactive	(Note: The chapter's charter was withdrawn.)
Omicron	March 21, 1903 – 1918	Marquette University	Milwaukee, Wisconsin	Inactive	(Note: Chapter formed at the Wisconsin College of Physicians and Surgeons, by absorbing a local group named Phi Alpha Phi, established in 1902. The Wisconsin College later merged into Marquette.)
Pi	October 31, 1903 – xxxx ?	Indiana University Bloomington	Bloomington, Indiana	Inactive	(Note: Pi chapter was formed by absorbing a local fraternity at the Medical College of Indiana. In 1905, all medical schools in Indiana were consolidated at the Medical College. At this time, a local fraternity at the Central College of Physicians and Surgeons was absorbed into Pi chapter.)
Chi Alpha	October 4, 1903 – xxxx ?	University of Georgia	Athens, Georgia	Inactive	(Note: This chapter was formed by absorbing the Alpha chapter of the Chi Zeta Chi medical fraternity following the national merger of the two fraternities. Its founding date goes back to the origins of Alpha chapter.)
Chi Beta	October 24, 1904 – 1959	Emory University	Atlanta, Georgia	Inactive	(Note: This chapter was formed by absorbing the Alpha Alpha chapter of the Chi Zeta Chi medical fraternity following the national merger of the two fraternities. Its founding date is from the Epsilon chapter of Chi Zeta Chi, a chapter that merged into Alpha Alpha.)
Chi Gamma	October 14, 1904 – 1936	University of Maryland	College Park, Maryland	Inactive	(Note: This chapter was formed by absorbing the Delta chapter of the Chi Zeta Chi medical fraternity following the national merger of the two fraternities. Its founding date is from the chartering of Delta.)
Rho	February 27, 1904 – 1965	Thomas Jefferson University	Philadelphia, Pennsylvania	Inactive	(Note: Chapter formed by absorbing a local group named Tau Beta Alpha. In 1929, it merged with the Tau chapter of Chi Zeta Chi after the national merger of the two fraternities.)
Sigma	May 6, 1904 – 1929	University of Virginia Medical Department	Charlottesville, Virginia	Inactive	
Tau (see **Theta Tau**)	April 15, 1905 – 1907	University of Minnesota	Minneapolis, Minnesota	Consolidated	(Note: Chapter formed by absorbing a local fraternity.)
Chi Delta	1906–xxxx ?	University of South Carolina	Columbia, South Carolina	Inactive	(Note: This chapter was formed by reforming the Iota chapter of the Chi Zeta Chi medical fraternity following the national merger of the two fraternities. Its founding date comes from "Iota".)
Chi Epsilon	October 14, 1906 – xxxx ?	University of Tennessee	Knoxville, Tennessee	Inactive	(Note: This chapter was formed by absorbing the Lambda chapter of the Chi Zeta Chi medical fraternity following the national merger of the two fraternities. Its founding date is from the chartering of Lambda.)
Chi Eta	November 26, 1906 – xxxx ?	Saint Louis University School of Medicine	St. Louis, Missouri	Inactive	(Note: This chapter was formed by absorbing the Xi chapter of the Chi Zeta Chi medical fraternity following the national merger of the two fraternities. Its founding date is from the chartering of Xi.)
Chi Zeta	November 15, 1906 – 1939	University of Arkansas	Fayetteville, Arkansas	Inactive	(Note: This chapter was formed by absorbing the Nu chapter of the Chi Zeta Chi medical fraternity following the national merger of the two fraternities. Its founding date is from the chartering of Nu.)
Upsilon	April 28, 1906 – xxxx ?	Medical College of Virginia	Richmond, Virginia	Inactive	(Note: Chapter was originally located at the University College of Medicine, which later merged into the Medical College of Virginia. In 1929, it merged with the Psi chapter of the Chi Zeta Chi following the national merger of the two fraternities.)
Phi (see Lambda Phi)	October 6, 1906 – 1916	University of Pennsylvania	Philadelphia, Pennsylvania	Consolidated	(Note: Merged with Lambda chapter to form Lambda Phi chapter.)
Skull & Sceptre	March 2, 1907 – 1919	Yale University	New Haven, Connecticut	Inactive	(Note: Chapter formed by absorbing a local group named Skull and Sceptre Society, which was established on April 26, 1894. It was allowed to retain its name as a chapter designation although its name is not in harmony with the fraternity's system of chapter nomenclature.)
**Theta Tau**	1907	University of Minnesota	Minneapolis, Minnesota	Active	
Chi	March 12, 1908 – 1970	University of Pittsburgh	Pittsburgh, Pennsylvania	Inactive	(Note: Chapter formed by absorbing a local group named Alpha Kappa Psi, established in 1894, at the University of Western Pennsylvania. Western Pennsylvania later became the University of Pittsburgh.)
Psi	January 22, 1909 – 1972	University of Colorado Boulder	Boulder, Colorado	Inactive	(Note: Chapter was formed by absorbing a local fraternity.)
Alpha Omega Delta	April 17, 1911 – 1931	University at Buffalo	Buffalo, New York	Inactive	(Note: Chapter formed by absorbing the Alpha chapter of Alpha Omega Delta, the last surviving chapter of that medical society which was established on October 24, 1874.)
Omega	1913–1943	Ohio State University	Columbus, Ohio	Inactive	(Note: Chapter formed by absorbing the Alpha Beta chapter of Phi Delta.)
Alpha Beta	1913–1932	Columbia University	New York City, New York	Inactive	
Alpha Gamma	1913–1938	McGill University	Montreal, Quebec, Canada	Inactive	
Lambda Phi	1916–1973	University of Pennsylvania School of Medicine	Philadelphia, Pennsylvania	Inactive	(Note: Chapter formed by the merger of Lambda and Phi chapters.)
Delta Omicron Alpha	1918–1950	Tulane University	New Orleans, Louisiana	Inactive	(Note: In 1929, this chapter merged with the Mu chapter of the Chi Zeta Chi medical fraternity following the national merger of the two fraternities.)
Alpha Delta	1921–1944	University of Washington	Seattle, Washington	Inactive	
Alpha Epsilon	1922–1942	University of Toronto	Toronto, Ontario, Canada	Inactive	
Alpha Zeta	1923–1959	Stanford University	Stanford, California	Inactive	
Chi Theta	1924–1965	Wake Forest University	Winston-Salem, North Carolina	Inactive	(Note: Although this chapter's name indicates that it originated with the national merger of Chi Zeta Chi medical fraternity, documentation is needed on a Wake Forest chapter.)
Alpha Eta	1924–xxxx ?	Dalhousie University	Nova Scotia, Canada	Inactive	
Alpha Theta	1927–1935	University of Cincinnati	Cincinnati, Ohio	Inactive	
Alpha Iota	1929–1944	University of Manitoba	Winnipeg, Manitoba, Canada	Inactive	
Alpha Kappa	1932–1938	University of Rochester	Rochester, New York	Inactive	
Alpha Lambda	1933–xxxx ?	Temple University	Philadelphia, Pennsylvania	Inactive	
Alpha Mu	1935–1941	Louisiana State University	Baton Rouge, Louisiana	Inactive	
**Alpha Nu**	1939	University of Texas Medical Branch	Galveston, Texas	Active	
**Alpha Omicron**	1939–1944, 1956	University of Texas Southwestern Medical Center	Dallas, Texas	Inactive	
Alpha Pi	1948–1965	University of Utah	Salt Lake City, Utah	Inactive	
Alpha Rho	1958–1969	Seton Hall University	South Orange, New Jersey	Inactive	
Iota Gamma	1964–1974	University of California, Irvine School of Medicine	Irvine, California	Inactive	
**Iota** (see Iota Alpha and Iota Beta)	1968	University of Nebraska–Lincoln	Lincoln, Nebraska	Active	
**Alpha Upsilon**	2012	Wright State University	Dayton, Ohio	Active	

=== Alumni chapters ===
Chapter	Chartered	Location	Status	References
Chicago Alumni	November 12, 1901	Chicago, Illinois		
Milwaukee Alumni	February 1905 – 1905	Milwaukee, Wisconsin		

== See also ==
- Chi Zeta Chi
- Professional fraternities and sororities
