= Chi Zeta Chi =

American medical fraternity (1903–1929)

- ΧΖΧ
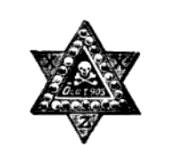
- Chi Zeta Chi badge, 1927
- Founded: October 4, 1903; 123 years ago University of Georgia Medical Department
- Type: Professional
- Affiliation: Independent
- Status: Merged
- Merge date: April 6, 1929
- Successor: Phi Rho Sigma
- Emphasis: Medicine
- Scope: National
- Motto: Chrisanthenes Zono Chrismon "Seeking Knowledge Our Highest Pursuit"
- Colors: Gold and Purple
- Flower: White carnation
- Chapters: 27
- Headquarters: United States

Chi Zeta Chi (ΧΖΧ) was an American medical fraternity that was established at the University of Georgia (now Medical College of Georgia) in 1903. It merged with Phi Rho Sigma Medical Fraternity in 1929.

== History ==
Chi Zeta Chi was established by Dr. Jesse Ainsley Griffin at the Medical Department of the University of Georgia on October 4, 1903. Griffin was a medical doctor in Augusta, Georgia who believed the southern medical schools needed a "high class fraternity". Membership was limited to white males who had completed the first year of medical school. The founding members were N. Whatley W. Battey Jr., Guy Talmadge Bernard, John B. Carter Jr., William Hampton Galloway, Jesse Ansley Griffin John Moore Sigman, John W. Simmons Jr., Rembert Hugo Thigpen, Hugh Rutledge Tison, and William Preston Turner Jr.

With the assistance of Battey, Griffin expanded the fraternity to the College of Physicians and Surgeons of Columbia University and the New York Polyclinic Medical College. The fraternity held its first conference in Atlanta in April 1905 with delegates from the first six chapters. Later that year, Phi Beta Phi medical fraternity offered to absorb Chi Zeta Chi; the latter declined the offer.

Originally, Chi Zeta Chi named its chapters after a distinguished physician related to the chapter's host institution. However, the fraternity adopted a new naming system based on the Greek alphabet at its third annual convention on January 8, 1909.

The fraternity was overseen by a Supreme Council and its designated Grand Council. It also had a regent for each state, which it called a province.

By 1927, the fraternity had installed 27 collegiate chapters; however, eight were defunct because their host institution closed, and seven were inactive. On April 6, 1929, in Cincinnati, Chi Zeta Chi signed an agreement to merge into Phi Rho Sigma Medical Fraternity.

== Symbols ==
The Greek letters ΧΖΧ in the fraternity's name stood for Chrisanthenes Zono Chrismon or "Seeking Knowledge Our Highest Pursuit", also the fraternity's motto.

The fraternity's colors were gold and purple. Its flower was the white carnation. The fraternity's badge consisted of two triangles superimposed on each other to create a six-pointed star. The lower triangle was base up and gold, with the Greek letter Χ in the upper two corners and Ζ in the lower corner, in black enamel. The upper triangle was base down and had a black enamel background that had an inlaid gold skull and crossbones above the Greek word iatros, meaning physician. The top triangle has a border of pearls and amethyst or ruby in each corner.

Chi Zeta Chi also had a grand chapter badge, which was a solid gold key engraved with the fraternity's coat of arms on a square flare. Its pledge pin was a round purple plaque made of celluloid that featured two hollow triangles, like those of the badge, outlined in gold. The fraternity also had an identification badge that was a replica of the coat of arms in bronze.

== Chapters ==
=== Collegiate chapters ===
Following are the chapters of Chi Zeta Chi. Inactive chapters at the time of the merger, and inactive institutions are indicated in italics.

Chapter	Original name	Charter date and range	Institution	Location	Status	Ref.
Alpha	Milton Antony	October 4, 1903 – April 6, 1929	University of Georgia Medical Department	Augusta, Georgia	Merged (ΦΡΣ)	(Note: This chapter was organized in 1902, becoming the first fraternity of the medical school. In 1929, it became the Chi Alpha chapter of Phi Rho Sigma with the national merger of the two fraternities.)
Beta	Francis Delafield	May 1904–1919	Columbia University College of Physicians and Surgeons	New York City, New York	Inactive	(Note: Chapter went defunct during World War I.)
Gamma	J. Marion Sims, Prime	June 1904–1905	New York Polyclinic Medical College	New York City, New York	Inactive	
Delta	Louis McLane Tiffany	October 14, 1904 – April 6, 1929	University of Maryland Medical Department	Baltimore Maryland	Merged (ΦΡΣ)	(Note: Delta chapter consolidated with Zeta in 1913 and Rho in 1915. In 1929, it became the Chi Gamma chapter of Phi Rho Sigma with the national merger of the two fraternities.)
Epsilon	W. F. Westmoreland Sr.	October 25, 1904 – October 1913	Atlanta College of Physicians and Surgeons	Atlanta, Georgia	Consolidated	(Note: Kappa and Epsilon combined in 1915 as the new Alpha Alpha chapter when the Atlanta School of Medicine merged with the Atlanta College of P & S to form the Medical Department at Emory University.) (Note: This chapter was originally called the W. F. Westmoreland Sr. chapter, but was changed to the Robert Battey chapter. Later, it became the Epsilon chapter.)
Zeta	Edmund Rhett Walker	October 14, 1905 – 1913	Baltimore Medical College	Baltimore, Maryland	Consolidated	(Note: Chapter consolidated with Delta chapter when the Baltimore Medical College merged with the University of Maryland.)
Eta	William Osler	1905–1906	Johns Hopkins University Medical Department	Baltimore, Maryland	Inactive	
Theta	Richard Douglas	May 1906–1919	Vanderbilt University Medical Department	Nashville, Tennessee	Inactive	
Iota	J. Marion Sims, Bis.	1906–1907	South Carolina Medical College	Charleston, South Carolina	Inactive	(Note: Chapter officially ended when South Carolina passed an anti-fraternity law. It did operate sub rosa for a time but was not recognized by the fraternity's Supreme Council. Later, it became the Chi Delta chapter of Phi Rho Sigma with the national merger of the two fraternities.)
Kappa	Crawford W. Long	November 1, 1906 – October 1913	Atlanta School of Medicine	Atlanta, Georgia	Consolidated	
Lambda	Heber Jones	October 14, 1906 – April 6, 1929	University of Tennessee Medical Department	Memphis, Tennessee	Merged (ΦΡΣ)	(Note: Phi chapter consolidated with the Lambda chapter when Lincoln Memorial University merged with the University of Tennessee in 1914.) (Note: The chapter originated at the College of Physicians and Surgeons which was absorbed by the University of Tennessee College of Medicine in Memphis in 1911. In 1929, it became the Chi Epsilon chapter of Phi Rho Sigma with the national merger of the two fraternities.)
Mu	Stanford Emerson Chaillé	November 1906 – April 6, 1929	Tulane University Medical Department	New Orleans, Louisiana	Merged (ΦΡΣ)	(Note: In 1929, this chapter merged with the Delta Omicron Alpha chapter of Phi Rho Sigma with the national merger of the two fraternities.)
Nu	James Anthony Dibrell	November 15, 1906 – April 6, 1929	University of Arkansas Medical Department	Little Rock, Arkansas	Merged (ΦΡΣ)	(Note: In 1929, it became the Chi Zeta chapter of Phi Rho Sigma with the national merger of the two fraternities.)
Xi	William Beaumont	November 26, 1906 – April 6, 1929	St. Louis University Medical Department	St. Louis, Missouri	Merged (ΦΡΣ)	(Note: Chapter was formed at the Marion Sims-Beaumont Medical College, which became the Medical Department at St. Louis University. In 1929, it became the Chi Eta chapter of Phi Rho Sigma with the national merger of the two fraternities.)
Omicron	John D. Hodges	January 6, 1906 – April 6, 1929	Washington University in St. Louis Medical Department	St. Louis, Missouri	Merged (ΦΡΣ)	(Note: In 1929, this chapter merged with the Alpha Delta chapter of Phi Rho Sigma with the national merger of the two fraternities.)
Pi	James M. G. Carter	December 6, 1907 – 1909	University of Illinois College of Physicians and Surgeons	Chicago, Illinois	Inactive	
Rho	John S. Lynch	February 1, 1908 – 1915	Baltimore College of Physicians and Surgeons	Baltimore, Maryland	Consolidated	
Digamma colony	Norman Bridge	October 1908–1909	University of Southern California	Los Angeles, California	Inactive	(Note: This chapter was organized but went defunct before it was chartered when the University of Southern California Medical School merged with the University of California Medical School. As a result, it was given an intercalary name instead of the planned Rho prime or Beta Rho.)
Sigma	Willam W. Johnston	February 25, 1908 – 1914	George Washington University Medical Department	Washington, D.C.	Inactive	
Tau	J. Marion Sims, Ter.	March 14, 1908 – 1910; 1922 –April 6, 1929	Jefferson Medical College	Philadelphia, Pennsylvania	Merged (ΦΡΣ)	(Note: In 1929, this chapter merged with the Rho chapter of Phi Rho Sigma with the national merger of the two fraternities.)
Upsilon	James. J. Walsh	May 20, 1908 – 1921	Fordham University Medical Department	New York City, New York	Inactive	(Note: Chapter went dormant when Fordham closed its medical department.)
Phi	Daniel Drake	November 8, 1908 – 1915	Lincoln Memorial University Medical Department	Knoxville, Tennessee	Inactive	
Chi	John Cowell MacEvitt	February 16, 1909 – 1914	Long Island Hospital Medical College	Brooklyn, New York	Inactive	
Psi	Arthur Holmes	February 26, 1910 – April 6, 1929	Medical College of Virginia	Richmond, Virginia	Merged (ΦΡΣ)	(Note: In 1929, this chapter merged with the Upsilon chapter of Phi Rho Sigma with the national merger of the two fraternities.)
Omega		January 2, 1911 – 1913	Birmingham Medical College (later University of Alabama)	Birmingham, Alabama	Inactive	
Alpha Alpha		October 1913 – April 6, 1929	Emory University School of Medicine	Atlanta, Georgia	Merged (ΦΡΣ)	(Note: In 1929, Alpha Alpha chapter became the Chi Beta chapter of Phi Rho Sigma with the national merger of the two fraternities.)
Beta Beta		May 28, 1921 – April 6, 1929	University of Oklahoma College of Medicine	Norman, Oklahoma	Merged (ΦΡΣ)	
Upsilon Upsilon		November 12, 1921 – April 6, 1929	Baylor University Medical Department	Dallas, Texas	Merged (ΦΡΣ)	
		1924 – April 6, 1929	Wake Forest University	Winston-Salem, North Carolina	Merged (ΦΡΣ)	(Note: After the merger of Chi Zeta Chi with Phi Rho Sigma in 1929, the latter had a Chi Theta chapter at Wake Forest University, indicating that this chapter existed. However, its name and documentation still need to be verified.)

=== Alumni chapters ===
Following is a list of Chi Zeta Chi alumni chapters:

Chapter	Charter date and range	Location	Status	Ref.
Atlanta Alumni	October 14, 1909	Atlanta, Georgia	Inactive	(Note: Chapter was rechartered in 1922 to modernize its original charter.)
Memphis Alumni	December 1911	Memphis, Tennessee	Inactive	
Augusta Alumni	December 1912	Augusta, Georgia	Inactive	
Knoxville Alumni	December 26, 1912	Knoxville, Tennessee	Inactive	
New York Alumni	February 4, 1913	New York City, New York	Inactive	
St. Louis Alumni	1920	St. Louis, Missouri	Inactive	(Note: The St. Louis Alumni chapter applied for its chapter in the fall of 1915. It was approved in December 1915 but was not issued until 1920.)
Baltimore Alumni	January 3, 1920	Baltimore, Maryland	Inactive	
Florida State Alumni	1921	Florida	Inactive	
Missouri State Alumni	1922	Missouri	Inactive	
Hot Springs–Little Rock Alumni	Before 1923	Hot Springs and Little Rock, Arkansas	Inactive	
New Orleans Alumni	Before 1923	New Orleans, Louisiana	Inactive	

== Notable members ==
- Bradbury Robinson, football player and physician

== See also ==
- Professional fraternities and sororities
