= Delta Omicron Alpha =

American medical fraternity (1907–1917)

- ΔΟΑ
- Delta Omicron Alpha badge
- Founded: 1907; 119 years ago Tulane University
- Type: Professional
- Affiliation: Independent
- Status: Merged
- Merge date: November 17, 1917
- Successor: Kappa Psi
- Emphasis: Medical
- Scope: National
- Colors: Gold and White
- Flower: White rose
- Publication: Delta Alpha Omicron Quarterly
- Chapters: 8
- Members: 1,063 lifetime
- Headquarters: New Orleans, Louisiana; United States

Delta Omicron Alpha (ΔΟΑ) was an American medical fraternity that operated from 1907 to 1917. This national professional fraternity was established at Tulane University and merged with Kappa Psi in 1917.

== History ==
Delta Omicron Alpha was established in 1907 at the College of Medicine of Tulane University in New Orleans, Louisiana. Its founders created by-laws and a constitution, along with a ritual. The fraternity was managed through a Grand Chapter and held annual conventions.

Delta Omicron Alpha became a national fraternity with the creation of Beta chapter at Columbia University in 1908. In 1910, the Gamma and Delta chapters were established at the University of Tennessee and Southwestern University, respectively. Four additional chapters were added between 1911 and 1914. However, several medical schools closed or merged around 1915 because of a reduced number of students, resulting in two chapters closing and others struggling.

Delta Omicron Alpha merged with the medical and pharmaceutical fraternity Kappa Psi on November 17, 1917. Before the merger, the fraternity had initiated 1,063 members.

== Symbols and traditions ==
Delta Omicron Alpha's badge was a black enameled triangle, edged with jewels. It was decorated with gold Greek letters ΔΟΑ in the center. A gold star was above the letters, with a gold serpent below the letters.

The fraternity's colors were gold and white. Its flower was a white rose. Its publication was the Delta Omicron Alpha Quarterly.

== Chapters ==
Following is a list of the chapters of Delta Omicron Alpha, with inactive chapters and institutions indicated in italics.

Chapter	Charter date and range	Institution	Location	Status	Ref.
Alpha	1907 – December 1, 1917	Tulane University School of Medicine	New Orleans, Louisiana	Merged (ΚΨ)	(Note: Chapter merged into the Pi (first) chapter of Kappa Psi as part of the national merger of the two fraternities.)
Beta	1908 – November 17, 1917	Columbia University College of Physicians and Surgeons	New York City, New York	Merged (ΚΨ)	(Note: Chapter merged into the Gamma chapter of Kappa Psi as part of the national merger of the two fraternities.)
Gamma	1910 – 191x ?	University of Tennessee	Knoxville, Tennessee	Inactive	(Note: Chapter closed before the national merger due to reduced medical students at the university.)
Delta	1910–1915	Southwestern University College of Medicine	Georgetown, Texas	Inactive	(Note: Chaper went defunct when Southwestern closed its College of Medicine.)
Epsilon	1910 – November 29, 1917	University of Alabama	Tuscaloosa, Alabama	Merged (ΚΨ)	(Note: Chapter merged with Iota chapter of Kappa Psi as part of the national merger of the two fraternities.)
Zeta	1912–1915	Birmingham Medical College	Birmingham, Alabama	Inactive	(Note: Birmingham Medical College (BMC) closed in 1912. In October 1913, the Graduate Medical School of Alabama began operating in the former BMC facilities, allowing the remaining BMC students to graduate. This chapter went defunct when the last BMC students graduated in June 1915.)
Eta	1912 – December 15, 1917	Fort Worth School of Medicine	Fort Worth, Texas	Merged (ΚΨ)	(Note: Chapter became the Beta Sigma (first) chapter of Kappa Phi as part of the national merger of the two fraternities. Fort Worth School of Medicine closed in 1919.)
Theta	1914 – November 17, 1917	Chicago College of Medicine and Surgery	Valparaiso, Indiana	Merged (ΚΨ)	(Note: Chicago College of Medicine and Surgery was part of Valparaiso University. It was purchased by Loyola University in 1917, the same year the fraternity merged with Kappa Psi. The chapter became the Beta Rho (first) chapter of Kappa Psi with the national merger.)

== See also ==
- List of Kappa Psi chapters
- Professional fraternities and sororities
