= Phi Beta Pi =

American medical fraternity

- ΦΒΠ
- Founded: March 10, 1891; 135 years ago West Pennsylvania Medical College
- Type: Professional
- Affiliation: Independent
- Former affiliation: PFA
- Status: Active
- Emphasis: Medicine
- Scope: Local
- Member badge
- Colors: Emerald green white
- Flower: White chrysanthemum
- Publication: The Talisman
- Chapters: 1 active, 62 chartered
- Headquarters: 1202 Church Street; Formerly: 401 Mechanic Street; Galveston, Texas 77550; United States
- Website: phibetapi.com

Phi Beta Pi (ΦΒΠ) is an American professional fraternity for medical students that was founded in 1891 at the West Pennsylvania Medical College. Currently, it operates as a local fraternity at the University of Texas Medical Branch.

== History ==
Phi Beta Pi medical fraternity is a professional fraternity founded on March 10, 1891, at the West Pennsylvania Medical College, a school that is now a department of the University of Pittsburgh). It was, at its beginning, an anti-fraternity society, reactionary to the more secret groups of the day. At formation it was known briefly as Pi Beta Phi professional fraternity, but changed its name because a woman's fraternity also known as Pi Beta Phi had prior claim to that name.

Its Beta chapter was established at the University of Michigan on April 1, 1898, with its first national general assembly in Ann Arbor on January 6, 1900.

Baird's Manual (20th ed.) reports that Phi Beta Pi absorbed an early, secret medical fraternity named Kappa Lambda, which may have been the first professional fraternity of any account. It had been founded in 1803 at Transylvania University, in Lexington, Kentucky, extending chapters to the College of Physicians and Surgeons of New York, to Rutgers University Medical School (NJ), the Jefferson Medical College in Philadelphia, and elsewhere. It continued to be active in New York until the eve of the Civil War, to 1858 or later, "but having no useful purpose faded into oblivion." Baird's reports that what remained of Kappa Lambda consolidated with Phi Beta Pi under that name, even though Phi Beta Pi dates to 1891.

Over three decades, the fraternity chartered 53 chapters. Growth slowed, adding ten more by 1955. Growth was difficult, with probably the biggest factor cited was the consolidation and discontinuance of medical schools. In 1906, there were 162 medical schools in the United States and Canada, but by 1954 there were 79. Additionally, medical societies competed among themselves. Phi Beta Pi gained from others' loss: Omega Upsilon Phi fraternity merged into Phi Beta Pi in 1934. All active chapters became chapters of Phi Beta Pi except Alpha which joined Phi Chi Medical Fraternity.

In what was considered a merger of equals, Phi Beta Pi consolidated operations with Theta Kappa Psi, both contributing their remaining chapters in 1961 and retaining the names of both national fraternities. Some chapters, notably those in Texas and Manitoba, fought against this merger that, at first, would have required Theta Kappa Psi to give up its name. These groups began to organize a schismatic and similarly named international group, but this effort failed to launch.

Thirty years later, in the spring of 1992, Phi Beta Pi–Theta Kappa Psi was dissolved. At the time of dissolution, there were only nine active chapters. The only remaining chapter is at The University of Texas Medical Branch in Galveston, Texas.

== Symbols ==
The Phi Beta Pi badge is a diamond of gold with emerald points and pearl edges. It has a black enamel center with gold skull and pelvis and the Greek letters ΦΒΠ. Its colors are emerald green and white. Its flower is the white chrysanthemum.

== Chapters ==
Phi Beta Pi chartered 62 chapters. Currently, it operates as a local organization at the University of Texas Medical Branch.

== Notable members ==
- Robert Perry, student, St. Louis University Medical School, https://time.com/archive/6599525/education-boys-will-be-boys/
- Otis Bowen, 44th Governor of Indiana and United States Secretary of Health and Human Services
- W. Dennis Kendig, Virginia Senate
- Bradbury Robinson, pioneering American football player

== See also ==
- Professional fraternities and sororities
