= Albany College of Pharmacy and Health Sciences =

Private college in Albany, New York, US

Coordinates: 42.653204°N 73.776279°W

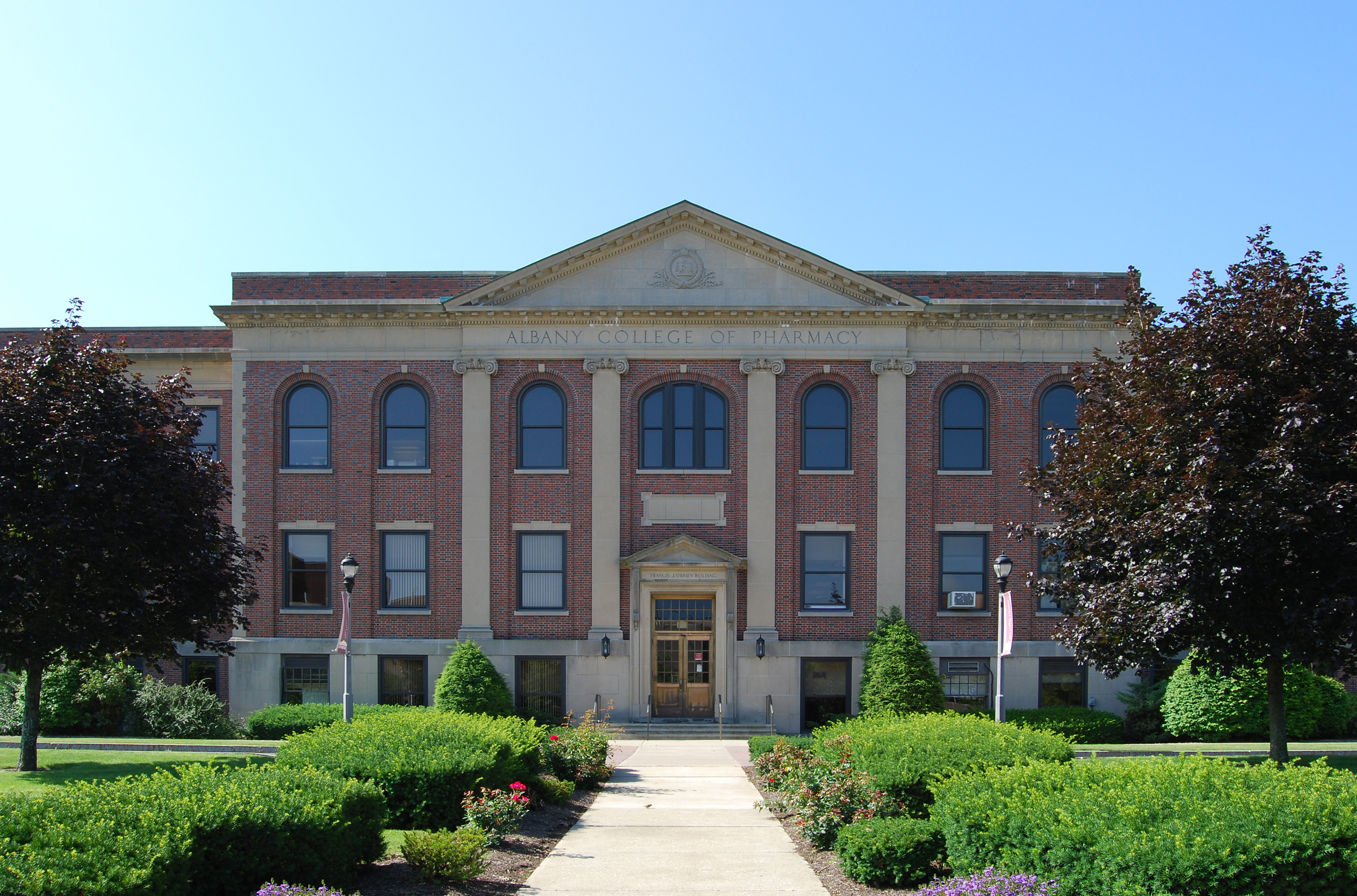
- Type: Private
- Established: 1881
- President: Matthew Shaftel (interim)
- Faculty: 69 full-time, 45 part-time (FA 2024)
- Students: 908 (FA 2024)
- Location: Albany, New York, United States
- Mascot: Panther
- Website: http://www.acphs.edu/

Albany College of Pharmacy and Health Sciences (formerly Albany College of Pharmacy) is a private, independent college with a campus in Albany, New York. It is currently in the process of merging with Russell Sage College in a gradual process that is planned to be completed by Fall 2027.

== History ==
On June 12, 1881, Albany College of Pharmacy was founded as the nation's 14th pharmacy program. Dr. E.N. Potter, then President of Union College as well as Union University approved the formation of the College at Union University's annual board meeting.

In April 2025, it was announced that Albany College of Pharmacy and Health Sciences would merge with Russell Sage College in a gradual process that is planned to be completed by Fall 2027.

In 2026, the 10th and final president of Albany College of Pharmacy of Health Sciences, Toyin Tofade, was named president emeritus as part of the merger with Russell Sage. The president of Russell Sage, Matthew Shaftel, currently serves as interim president of Albany College of Pharmacy and Health Sciences.

== Academics ==
ACPHS is home to approximately 900 students, 69 full-time faculty and 45 part-time faculty.

== Campus ==
The ACPHS Campus is located at 106 New Scotland Avenue in the University Heights section of Albany, a higher education and health care cluster that includes Albany Law School, Albany Medical College, and Russell Sage College's Albany campus, as well as Albany Medical Center, St. Peter's Hospital, and the Albany Stratton VA Medical Center.

The Albany campus is composed of eight buildings:

- Francis J. O’Brien Building – Opened in 1927, this building is home to lecture halls, research and teaching labs, faculty and administrative offices, and the Throop Pharmacy Museum.
- Gozzo Student Center – Opened in 2006, the Student Center features a dining hall, bookstore, and two large lecture halls.
- Albert M. White Gymnasium – The home court for the men's and women's basketball teams and a variety of intramural and recreational activities.
- Library Building – The bottom two floors are dedicated to the library while the top floor contains a range of student support services.
- Biosciences Research Building – This former Bender Hygienic Laboratories building is home to the Department of Pharmaceutical Sciences and houses a number of research laboratories.
- Holland Building – This multi-purpose building includes classrooms, teaching laboratories, faculty and staff offices, and residence suites.
- South Hall – A residence hall primarily for first year students.

=== Former location ===
ACPHS had a campus in Colchester, Vermont located at 261 Mountain View Drive from 2009 to 2021 that shut down due to declining enrollment. The Vermont Campus offered a 4-year PharmD degree as well as a two-year master's degree in Pharmaceutical Sciences. At the time, it was the only pharmacy program in Vermont.

== Athletics ==
The ACPHS athletic teams are called the Panthers. The college is a member of the United States Collegiate Athletic Association (USCAA), primarily competing in the Yankee Small College Conference (YSCC) since the 2020–21 academic year. The Panthers previously competed as a founding member of the Hudson Valley Intercollegiate Athletic Conference (HVIAC) from 2004–05 to 2018–19; as well as an USCAA Independent during the 2019–20 school year. ACPHS competes in eight intercollegiate varsity sports (all on the Albany Campus): Sports include basketball, cross country, soccer, track & field, while club sports include golf, hockey, lacrosse and tennis.

The women's basketball team won the school's only national championship in 2013 when it defeated Berkeley College 60–54 to win the USCAA Division II National Championship. The ACPHS track and field was renovated in 2012 at a cost of $2.5 million.

== Notable alumni ==
- Fred Isabella (1917–2007), dentist and member of the New York State Senate
