= Union University (New York) =

Federation of universities in New York State

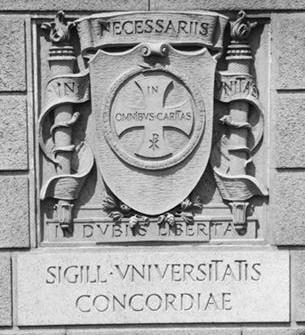
The Seal of Union University on the Exterior Wall of the University Club of New York in Manhattan

Union University is a loose federation of Union College and a number of graduate schools, including Albany Medical College, Albany Law School, Albany College of Pharmacy, and Dudley Observatory, founded in 1873 and located in the New York Capital District.

The motto on its seal is In necessariis unitas, in dubiis libertas, in omnibus caritas. Translated into English it means, "Unity in necessary matters, freedom in doubtful matters, charity toward all."

== History ==
Union University was incorporated by an act of the New York State Legislature on April 10, 1873, and anchored by Union College in nearby Schenectady, founded in 1795 and the second oldest college in the state.

Union University founded Albany College of Pharmacy and Health Sciences in 1881.

As of 2021, according to the Albany Law School, one of the constituent institutions, the university exists "in name only" and "each member institution has its own governing board and operates its own institutions independently." There were also discussions about "the continued viability of the Union University relationship."

== Member institutions ==
- Albany College of Pharmacy and Health Sciences
- Albany Law School
- Albany Medical College
- Dudley Observatory
- Union College

=== Former ===
- Union Graduate College (2003–2016); merged into Clarkson University in 2016

== See also ==
- Wilmer Ingalls Gordon
