= List of schools in the Wake County Public School System =

Wake County Public School System

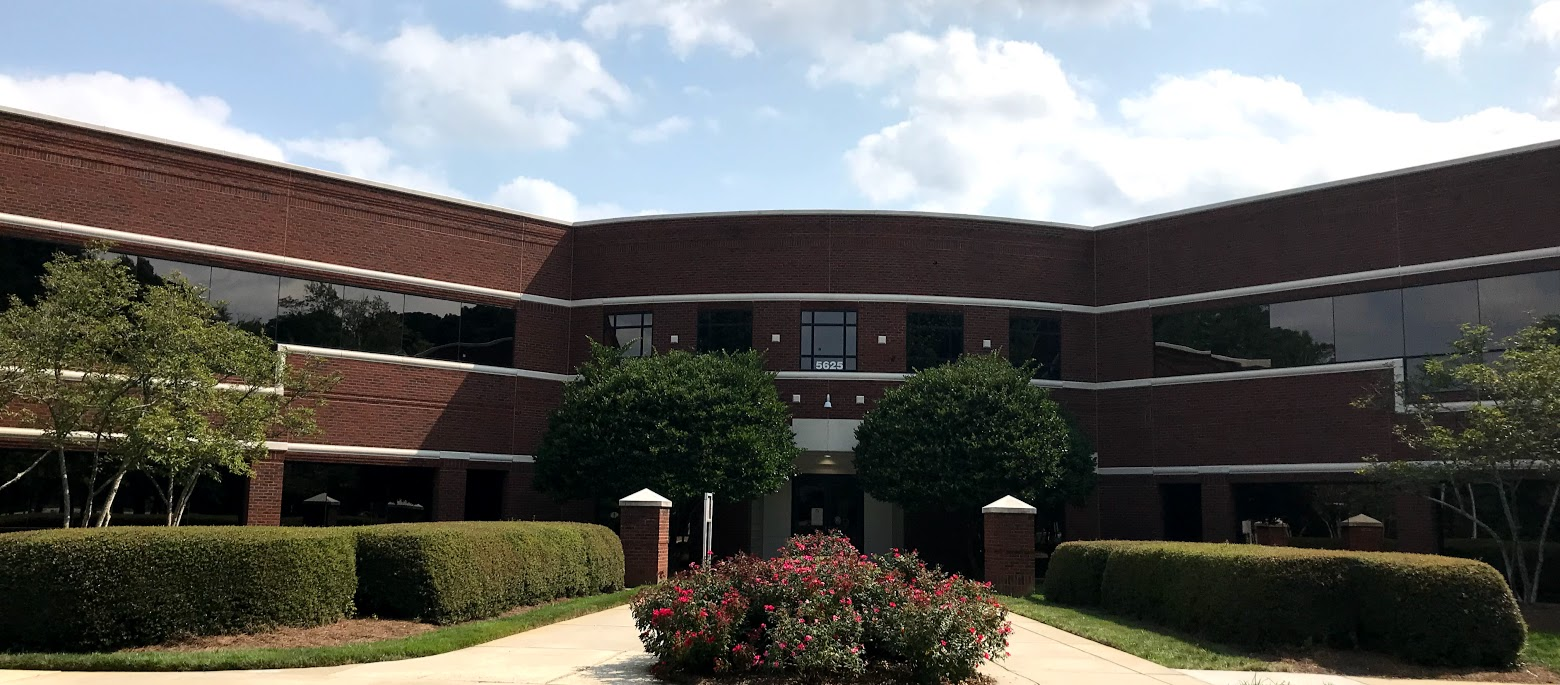
- The main office of Wake County Public School System

Address
- 5625 Dillard Drive Cary, North Carolina, 27518; United States
- Coordinates: 35°45′14.51″N 78°44′13.67″W

District information
- Established: 1976; 50 years ago
- Superintendent: Dr. Robert P. Taylor
- Budget: $2.23 billion (2024–25) (Note: As of the newest statistics from the WCPSS website in August 2025)
- NCES District ID: 3704720

Students and staff
- Enrollment: 161,115 (2025–26)
- Staff: 10,840 (2024)

Other information
- Website: www.wcpss.net

This is a list of schools operated by the Wake County Public School System (WCPSS) in Wake County, North Carolina. As of the 2025–26 school year, WCPSS is responsible for more than 161,115 students across 203 schools, making them the largest school system in the state as of 2025, and the 14th-largest in the United States as of the newest statistics from 2021. Across these schools, WCPSS maintains a staff of 20,060 including 10,840 teachers: of whom 41.56% have advanced degrees and 1,384 are National Board-certified teachers. Additionally, 56,227 of the students within WCPSS are part of a Free or Reduced-price Lunch (FRL) program, 20,829 are part of a Limited English Proficiency (LEP) program, and 20,511 are part of a Special education program. Finally, the budget for WCPSS exceeds $2.23 billon, totaling to about $13,460 per student.

The Wake County Public School System was founded on July 1, 1976, after the merger of the two segregated school systems operating in the county named Wake County Schools and Raleigh City Schools. The effort to desegregate the county was aided by the opening of the county's first magnet school the following year in Raleigh, in an initial attempt to encourage white students to learn in the majority-black Raleigh area. WCPSS has since become notable for its integration efforts, being used as a metaphor for hope by Professor Gerald Grant of Syracuse University in his 2009 book Hope and Despair in the American City: Why There Are No Bad Schools in Raleigh. Today, WCPSS is adapting to a rapidly-growing population in the county, opening one new high school and three new elementary schools for the 2025–26 school year. WCPSS also faces challenges in the form of major cuts in federal funding, being one of the worst impacted school systems in the country after decisions from President Trump, and their approach to the use of artificial intelligence in education, for which the system supports at least partially.

The school directory below is current as of the newest statistics from the 2024–25 school year, and is collected through a number of sources including primary and secondary lists. The tables are divided between sections for high school, middle school, elementary school, and other public schools still under WCPSS. Within each table is the name of school, the city they're located in, their school type (which can be either traditional, magnet, or early college), grade levels, calendar (which can either be traditional, (Note: The attached reference leads to the 2025–26 traditional calendar for WCPSS.) year-round, (Note: The attached reference leads to the 2025–26 year-round calendar for WCPSS.) or modified calendar (Note: The attached reference leads to the 2025–26 modified calendar for WCPSS.)), total students (Note: Measured by Average Daily Membership (ADM): the number of days a student attends school divided by the number of days in a school year.), percent of students on Free or Reduced-price Lunch (FRL), percent of students with Limited English Proficiency (LEP), and their Title I status. Among other reasons, these metrics were chosen as they are the ones outlined by WCPSS in their yearly report and likewise are the most important to the county.

== High schools ==
Below is the current list of public high schools administered by WCPSS as of the 2024–2025 school year. The table values for "City" are sourced from U.S. News & World Report, "School type" from the WCPSS Magnet and Early Colleges Directory, and the remaining information from the WCPSS 2024–2025 Districts Facts Report. Any additional references used are listed on the right end of the table.

List of high schools in the Wake County Public School System
School	City	School type	Grade levels	Calendar	Total students	Year Opened	FRL %	LEP %	Title I	Ref.
Apex Friendship High School	Apex	Traditional	9–12	Traditional	2,741	2015	11.2%	2.0%	No	
Apex High School	Apex	Traditional	9–12	Traditional	2,449	1920, 2019	21.7%	7.8%	No	
Athens Drive High School	Raleigh	Magnet: Center for Medical Sciences and Global Health Initiatives	9–12	Traditional	2,116	1978	43.2%	15.5%	No	
Broughton High School	Raleigh	Magnet: Global Studies and Language Immersion/International Baccalaureate Diploma Programme	9–12	Traditional	2,140	1929	27.3%	8.0%	No	
Cary High School	Cary	Traditional	9–12	Traditional	2,040	1896, 1960	37.9%	15.2%	No	
Crossroads FLEX High School	Cary	Magnet-related: Flexible Learning EXperience for personal pursuits (i.e. competitive arts, sports)	9–12	Traditional	139	2016	5.8%	0.0%	No	
East Wake High School	Wendell	Magnet: iTech and Design	9–12	Traditional	1,772	1977	62.10%	13%	Yes	
Enloe High School	Raleigh	Magnet: Gifted and Talented/International Baccalaureate DP Programme	9–12	Traditional	2,604	1962	27.30%	6.8%	No	
Felton Grove High School	Apex	Traditional	9–12	Traditional	800	2025	N/A	N/A	N/A	
Fuquay-Varina High School	Fuquay-Varina	Traditional	9–12	Traditional	1,839	1925, 2021	25.1%	5.3%	No	
Garner High School	Garner	Magnet: International Baccalaureate - Middle Years and Diploma Programme	9–12	Traditional	1,663	1968, 2018	52.60%	16.9%	No	
Green Hope High School	Cary	Traditional	9–12	Traditional	2,306	1999	11.8%	6.6%	No	
Green Level High School	Cary	Traditional	9–12	Traditional	2,282	2019	6.3%	3.2%	No	
Heritage High School	Wake Forest	Traditional	9–12	Traditional	1,773	2010	27.2%	11.8%	No	
Holly Springs High School	Holly Springs	Traditional	9–12	Traditional	2,016	2006	13.6%	2.5%	No	
Knightdale High School	Knightdale	Traditional	9–12	Early College	1,693	2004	64.6%	19.1%	Yes	
Leesville Road High School	Raleigh	Traditional	9–12	Traditional	2,401	1993	23.9%	7.3%	No	
Middle Creek High School	Apex	Traditional	9–12	Traditional	1,583	2002	28.70%	9.9%	No	
Millbrook High School	Raleigh	Magnet: International Baccalaureate - Middle Years & Diploma Programme	9–12	Traditional	2,481	1922	32.8%	12.2%	No	
North Wake College and Career Academy	Wake Forest	Early College	9–13	Early College	346	2016	35.8%	2.9%	No	
Panther Creek High School	Cary	Traditional	9–12	Traditional	2,598	2006	14.8%	6.6%	No	
Phillips High School	Raleigh	Traditional	9–12	Traditional	119	1975	66.4%	9.2%	Yes	
Rolesville High School	Rolesville	Traditional	9–12	Traditional	2,319	2013	49.7%	14.7%	No	
Sanderson High School	Raleigh	Traditional	9–12	Traditional	1,640	1968	42.3%	15.9%	No	
SCORE Academy	Cary	Traditional	9–12	Traditional	617	2017	54.2%	10.0%	Yes	
South Garner High School	Garner	Traditional	9–12	Traditional	1,827	2018	60.1%	17.2%	Yes	
Southeast Raleigh High School	Raleigh	Magnet: University Connections: School of Design, Art and Engineering	9–12	Modified	1,442	1997	62.1%	19.6%	Yes	
Vernon Malone College and Career Academy	Raleigh	Early College	9–13	Early College	348	2014	44.7%	3.2%	No	
Wake Early College of Health and Sciences	Raleigh	Early College	9–13	Early College	318	2006	34.0%	1.3%	No	
Wake Early College of Information and Biotechnologies	Morrisville	Early College	9–13	Early College	260	2022	15.8%	1.5%	No	
Wake Forest High School	Wake Forest	Traditional	9–12	Traditional	2,022	1941	29.6%	8.2%	No	
Wake STEM Early College High School	Cary	Early College	9–13	Early College	292	2011	35.3%	1.0%	No	
Wakefield High School	Raleigh	Traditional	9–12	Traditional	2,046	2000	35.0%	8.5%	No	
Willow Spring High School	Fuquay-Varina	Traditional	9–12	Traditional	2,215	2021	28.5%	7.4%	No	

== Middle schools ==
Below is the current list of public middle schools administered by WCPSS as of the 2024–2025 school year. The table values for "City" are sourced from U.S. News & World Report, "School type" from the WCPSS Magnet and Early Colleges Directory, and the remaining information from the WCPSS 2024–2025 Districts Facts Report. Any additional references used are listed on the right end of the table.

List of middle schools in the Wake County Public School System
School	City	School type	Grade levels	Calendar	Total students	FRL %	LEP %	Title I	Ref.
Alston Ridge Middle School	Cary	Traditional	6–8	Year-Round	1,520	20.0%	10.7%	No	
Apex Friendship Middle School	Apex	Traditional	6–8	Traditional	1,409	7.9%	3.1%	No	
Apex Middle School	Apex	Traditional	6–8	Traditional	869	23.9%	9.0%	No	
Carnage Middle School	Raleigh	Magnet: Gifted and Talented/AIG Basics	6–8	Traditional	918	31.1%	6.3%	No	
Carroll Middle School	Raleigh	Magnet: Leadership in Technology	6–8	Traditional	886	60.8%	21.0%	Yes	
Centennial Campus Middle School	Raleigh	Magnet: Center for Innovation	6–8	Modified	476	62.7%	22.5%	Yes	
Connections Academy	Cary	Traditional	6–8	Traditional	12	46.2%	15.4%	Yes	
Davis Drive Middle School	Cary	Traditional	6–8	Traditional	995	12.9%	13.5%	No	
Dillard Drive Middle School	Raleigh	Magnet: Center for World Languages & Spanish Immersion	6–8	Traditional	968	49.9%	19.9%	Yes	
Durant Road Middle School	Raleigh	Traditional	6–8	Year-Round	652	64.4%	22.6%	Yes	
East Cary Middle School	Cary	Magnet: Center for World Languages and Global Studies	6–8	Traditional	592	35.1%	10.2%	No	
East Garner Middle School	Garner	Magnet: International Baccalaureate Middle Years Programme/Creative Arts	6–8	Traditional	1,109	62.6%	18.1%	Yes	
East Millbrook Middle School	Raleigh	Magnet: Academy of Arts and Design	6–8	Traditional	733	63.6%	25.3%	Yes	
Fuquay-Varina Middle School	Fuquay-Varina	Traditional	6–8	Traditional	1,004	28.1%	5.4%	No	
Herbert Akins Road Middle School	Fuquay-Varina	Traditional	6–8	Year-Round	1,260	31.6%	10.9%	No	
Heritage Middle School	Wake Forest	Traditional	6–8	Year-Round	950	16.1%	3.6%	No	
Holly Grove Middle School	Holly Springs	Traditional	6–8	Year-Round	991	17.1%	4.0%	No	
Holly Ridge Middle School	Holly Springs	Traditional	6–8	Traditional	958	25.4%	7.1%	No	
Leesville Road Middle School	Raleigh	Traditional	6–8	Traditional	792	30.9%	9.5%	No	
Ligon Middle School	Raleigh	Magnet: Gifted and Talented/AIG Basics	6–8	Traditional	956	33.8%	5.0%	No	
Lufkin Road Middle School	Apex	Traditional	6–8	Year-Round	1,041	31.1%	16.4%	No	
Martin Middle School	Raleigh	Magnet: Gifted and Talented	6–8	Traditional	1,010	28.5%	9.2%	No	
Mills Park Middle School	Cary	Traditional	6–8	Traditional	1,629	7.6%	3.2%	No	
Moore Square Middle School	Raleigh	Magnet: Gifted and Talented/AIG Basics	6–8	Modified	592	27.7%	3.4%	No	
Neuse River Middle School	Raleigh	Traditional	6–8	Modified	891	61.9%	25.5%	Yes	
North Garner Middle School	Garner	Traditional	6–8	Year-Round	855	51.2%	16.7%	Yes	
Oberlin Middle School	Raleigh	Magnet: Global Studies and Language Immersion	6–8	Traditional	1,051	28.2%	8.8%	No	
Pine Hollow Middle School	Raleigh	Traditional	6–8	Traditional	785	31.2%	8.2%	No	
Reedy Creek Middle School	Cary	Magnet: Center for the Digital Sciences	6–8	Traditional	797	35.0%	11.0%	No	
River Bend Middle School	Raleigh	Traditional	6–8	Traditional	997	62.2%	24.6%	Yes	
River Oaks Middle School	Raleigh	Traditional	6–8	Traditional	12	83.3%	16.7%	Yes	
Rolesville Middle School	Rolesville	Traditional	6–8	Traditional	897	40.4%	8.9%	No	
Salem Middle School	Apex	Traditional	6–8	Year-Round	1,067	18.1%	11.2%	No	
Wake Forest Middle School	Wake Forest	Traditional	6–8	Traditional	882	54.8%	11.7%	Yes	
Wakefield Middle School	Raleigh	Traditional	6–8	Traditional	804	30.4%	7.3%	No	
Wendell Middle School	Wendell	Magnet: Academy of Design and Creative Arts	6–8	Traditional	759	59.0%	17.4%	Yes	
West Cary Middle School	Cary	Traditional	6–8	Traditional	821	29.0%	17.3%	No	
West Lake Middle School	Apex	Traditional	6–8	Year-Round	690	39.5%	12.1%	No	
West Millbrook Middle School	Raleigh	Magnet: International Baccalaureate Middle Years Programme	6–8	Traditional	1,165	31.4%	13.5%	No	
Zebulon Middle School	Zebulon	Magnet: Center for Advanced Studies & STEM	6–8	Traditional	772	59.5%	11.1%	Yes	

== Elementary schools ==
Below will be the current list of public elementary schools administered by WCPSS as of the 2024–2025 school year. The table values for "City" are sourced from U.S. News & World Report, "School type" from the WCPSS Magnet and Early Colleges Directory, and the remaining information from the WCPSS 2024–2025 Districts Facts Report. Any additional references used are listed on the right end of the table.

Traditional public elementary schools
Name	Grades	Calendar	Location	School code	Ref.
Abbotts Creek Elementary School	PK-5	Traditional	Raleigh	920303	
Adams Elementary School	PK-5	Year-Round	Cary	920304	
Alston Ridge Elementary School	PK-5	Year-Round	Cary	920307	
Apex Elementary School	PK-5	Traditional	Apex	920308	
Apex Friendship Elementary School	PK-5	Traditional	Apex	920314	
Aversboro Elementary School	PK-5	Traditional	Garner	920320	
Baileywick Road Elementary School	PK-5	Traditional	Raleigh	920326	
Ballentine Elementary School	PK-5	Year-Round	Fuquay-Varina	920327	
Banks Road Elementary School	PK-5	Year-Round (Track 4)	Raleigh	920325	
Barton Pond Elementary School	K-5	Traditional	Raleigh	920330	
Barwell Road Elementary School	PK-5	Year-Round (Track 4)	Raleigh	920329	
Baucom Elementary School	PK-5	Traditional	Apex	920328	
Beaverdam Elementary School	PK-5	Traditional	Raleigh	920332	
Bowling Road Elementary	K-5	Traditional	Fuquay-Varina	E-49	
Brassfield Elementary School	K-5	Year-Round	Raleigh	920334	
Briarcliff Elementary School	PK-5	Traditional	Cary	920340	
Brier Creek Elementary School	PK-5	Year-Round	Raleigh	920342	
Bryan Road Elementary School	PK-5	Traditional	Garner	920349	
Buckhorn Creek Elementary School	PK-5	Traditional	Holly Springs	920351	
Carpenter Elementary School	PK-5	Year-Round	Cary	920358	
Carver Elementary School	PK-5	Modified	Wendell	920362	
Cary Elementary School	PK-5	Traditional	Cary	920364	
Cedar Fork Elementary School	PK-5	Traditional	Morrisville	920369	
Creech Road Elementary School	PK-5	Traditional	Garner	920384	
Davis Drive Elementary School	K-5	Traditional	Cary	920390	
Dillard Drive Elementary School	PK-5	Traditional	Raleigh	920393	
Durant Road Elementary School	PK-5	Year-Round (Track 4)	Raleigh	920398	
East Garner Elementary School	PK-5	Modified	Garner	920403	
Forest Pines Drive Elementary School	PK-5	Traditional	Raleigh	920417	
Forestville Road Elementary School	PK-5	Traditional	Knightdale	920413	
Fuquay-Varina Elementary School	PK-5	Traditional	Fuquay-Varina	920420	
Green Hope Elementary School	PK-5	Traditional	Cary	920439	
Harris Creek Elementary School	PK-5	Year-Round	Raleigh	920451	
Herbert Akins Rd Elementary School	PK-5	Year-Round	Fuquay-Varina	920306	
Heritage Elementary School	PK-5	Year-Round	Wake Forest	920454	
Highcroft Elementary School	PK-5	Traditional	Cary	920443	
Hilltop Needmore Elementary School	PK-5	Year Round	Fuquy-Varina		
Holly Grove Elementary School	PK-5	Year-Round	Holly Springs	920457	
Holly Ridge Elementary School	PK-5	Traditional	Holly Springs	920449	
Holly Springs Elementary School	PK-5	Year-Round	Holly Springs	920447	
Hortons Creek Elementary School	PK-5	Traditional	Cary	920459	
Jones Dairy Elementary School	PK-5	Year-Round	Wake Forest	920453	
Knightdale Elementary School	PK-5	Traditional	Knightdale	920464	
Lacy Elementary School	PK-5	Traditional	Raleigh	920468	
Lake Myra Elementary School	PK-5	Year-Round (Track 4)	Wendell	920474	
Laurel Park Elementary School	Apex	Year-Round	Apex	920467	
Lead Mine Elementary School	K-5	Traditional	Raleigh	920470	
Leesville Road Elementary School	K-5	Traditional	Raleigh	920469	
Lockhart Elementary School	PK-5	Year-Round (Track 4)	Knightdale	920480	
Lynn Road Elementary School	PK-5	Traditional	Raleigh	920488	
Middle Creek Elementary School	PK-5	Year-Round (Track 4)	Apex	920494	
Mills Park Elementary School	PK-5	Traditional	Cary	920501	
Morrisville Elementary School	K-5	Year-Round	Morrisville	920504	
North Forest Pines Elementary School	PK-5	Year-Round	Raleigh	920514	
North Ridge Elementary School	PK-5	Traditional	Raleigh	920516	
Northwoods Elementary School	PK-5	Traditional	Cary	920520	
Oak Grove Elementary School	PK-5	Year-Round	Raleigh	920522	
Oakview Elementary School	PK-5	Traditional	Apex	920521	
Olds Elementary School	PK-5	Traditional	Raleigh	920524	
Olive Chapel Elementary School	PK-5	Year-Round	Apex	920523	
Parkside Elementary School	PK-5	Year-Round	Morrisville	920527	
Penny Road Elementary School	K-5	Traditional	Cary	920530	
Pleasant Grove Elementary School	PK-5	Traditional	Morrisville	920533	
Pleasant Plains Elementary School	PK-5	Multi Track Year Round	Apex	520	
Pleasant Union Elementary School	PK-5	Year-Round	Raleigh	920531	
Rand Road Elementary School	PK-5	Year-Round (Track 4)	Garner	920540	
Reedy Creek Elementary School	K-5	Traditional	Cary	920542	
Rex Road Elementary School	K-5	Multi Track Year Round	Holly Springs	417	
Richland Creek Elementary School	PK-5	Traditional	Wake Forest	920543	
River Bend Elementary School	PK-5	Traditional	Raleigh	920302	
Rogers Lane Elementary School	PK-5	Traditional	Raleigh	920547	
Rolesville Elementary School	PK-5	Traditional	Rolesville	920544	
Root Elementary School	PK-5	Traditional	Raleigh	920548	
Salem Elementary School	PK-5	Year-Round	Apex	920550	
Sanford Creek Elementary School	PK-5	Year-Round	Rolesville	920554	
Scotts Ridge Elementary School	PK-5	Traditional	Apex	920557	
South Lakes Elementary School	PK-5	Traditional	Fuquay-Varina	920559	
Swift Creek Elementary School	K-5	Traditional	Raleigh	920568	
Sycamore Creek Elementary School	PK-5	Year-Round	Raleigh	920569	
Timber Drive Elementary School	PK-5	Year-Round (Track 4)	Garner	920570	
Turner Creek Elementary School	PK-5	Year-Round	Cary	920571	
Vance Elementary School	PK-5	Year-Round (Track 4)	Raleigh	920576	
Vandora Springs Elementary School	PK-5	Traditional	Garner	920580	
Wake Forest Elementary School	PK-5	Traditional	Wake Forest	920584	
Wakefield Elementary School	PK-5	Traditional	Raleigh	920593	
Wakelon Elementary School	PK-5	Traditional	Zebulon	920597	
Walnut Creek Elementary School	PK-5	Year-Round (Track 4)	Raleigh	920599	
Weatherstone Elementary School	PK-5	Traditional	Cary	920598	
West Lake Elementary School	PK-5	Year-Round (Track 4)	Apex	920606	
White Oak Elementary School	PK-5	Traditional	Apex	920614	
Wilburn Elementary School	PK-5	Year-Round (Track 4)	Raleigh	920616	
Wildwood Forest Elementary School	PK-5	Traditional	Raleigh	920618	
Willow Springs Elementary School	K-5	Year-Round	Willow Springs	920624	
Yates Mill Elementary School	PK-5	Traditional	Raleigh	920626	
York Elementary School	PK-5	Traditional	Raleigh	920628	

=== Magnet Elementary schools ===
Magnet elementary schools
Name	Grades	Calendar	Location	School code	Ref.
Brentwood Elementary School	PK-5	Traditional	Raleigh	920336	
Brooks Elementary School	PK-5	Traditional	Raleigh	920344	
Bugg Elementary School	PK-5	Traditional	Raleigh	920352	
Combs Elementary School	PK-5	Traditional	Raleigh	920376	
Conn Elementary School	PK-5	Traditional	Raleigh	920380	
Douglas Elementary School	PK-5	Traditional	Raleigh	920396	
Farmington Woods Elementary School	PK-5	Traditional	Cary	920414	
Fox Road Elementary School	K-5	Traditional	Raleigh	920415	
Fuller Elementary School	K-5	Traditional	Garner	920416	
Green Elementary School	PK-5	Traditional	Raleigh	920440	
Hodge Road Elementary School	PK-5	Year-Round (Track 4)	Knightdale	920446	
Hunter Elementary School	PK-5	Traditional	Raleigh	920448	
Jeffreys Grove Elementary School	PK-5	Traditional	Raleigh	920452	
Joyner Elementary School	PK-5	Traditional	Raleigh	920456	
Kingswood Elementary School	PK-5	Traditional	Cary	920460	
Lincoln Heights Elementary School	PK-5	Traditional	Fuquay-Varina	920476	
Millbrook Elementary School	PK-5	Traditional	Raleigh	920496	
Partnership Elementary School	K-5	Modified	Raleigh	920525	
Poe Elementary School	PK-5	Traditional	Raleigh	920532	
Powell Elementary School	PK-5	Traditional	Raleigh	920536	
Smith Elementary School	PK-5	Traditional	Raleigh	920560	
Southeast Raleigh Elementary School	PK-5	Traditional	Raleigh	920563	
Stough Elementary School	PK-5	Traditional	Raleigh	920564	
Underwood Elementary School	K-5	Traditional	Raleigh	920572	
Washington Elementary School	K-5	Traditional	Raleigh	920596	
Wendell Elementary School	K-5	Traditional	Wendell	920600	
Wiley Elementary School	PK-5	Traditional	Raleigh	920620	
Zebulon Elementary School	PK-5	Traditional	Zebulon	920632	

== Other schools ==
Below is the current list of other public schools which do not fall in one of the above grade classifications, administered by WCPSS as of the 2024–25 school year. The table values for "City" are sourced from U.S. News & World Report, "School type" from the previous source and the WCPSS Magnet and Early Colleges Directory, and the remaining information from the WCPSS 2024–25 Districts Facts Report. Any additional references used are listed on the right end of the table.

List of other schools in the Wake County Public School System
School	City	School type	Grade levels	Calendar	Total students	FRL %	LEP %	Title I	Ref.
Hilburn Drive Academy	Raleigh	Traditional	PK-8	Traditional	569	34.40%	9.7%	No	
Longview School	Raleigh	Traditional	6–12	Traditional	16	88.9%	5.6%	Yes	
Mount Vernon School	Raleigh	Traditional	K-8	Traditional	74	73.0%	6.8%	Yes	
Wake Young Men's Leadership Academy	Raleigh	Early College	6–13	Early College	263	35.0%	2.3%	No	
Wake Young Women's Leadership Academy	Raleigh	Early College	6–13	Early College	337	34.4%	2.4%	No	
