= List of public schools in Raleigh, North Carolina =

Public education in Raleigh, North Carolina, United States, is served by the Wake County Public School System and more than a dozen independent public charter schools.

== Public high schools ==
- Athens Drive High School is a co-educational secondary Wake County publicly funded high school that serves grades 9–12. In 2004–2005 the school had approximately 1,747 enrolled students and approximately 130 hired educators.
- Needham B. Broughton High School was founded in 1929 and is a co-educational, International Baccalaureate secondary Wake County publicly funded high school that serves grades 9–12. In 2005–2006, the school had approximately 2,157 enrolled students and approximately 150 hired educators.
- William G. Enloe High School opened in 1962. When it opened, it was the first integrated school in Raleigh.
- Leesville Road High School is a co-educational secondary Wake County public high school. It was built in 1993.
- Millbrook High School is a co-educational secondary Wake County public high school
- Jesse O. Sanderson High School is a co-educational secondary Wake County public high school that serves grades 9–12. As of 2004–2005, the school has approximately 1,800 enrolled students and approximately 150 hired educators.
- Southeast Raleigh Magnet High School is a co-educational secondary Wake County public high school with a Leadership & Technology Magnet Program. The school opened in July 1997.
- Wakefield High School is a co-educational secondary Wake County public high school that opened in August 2000, making it Raleigh's newest public high school.
- Mary E. Phillips High School
- Raleigh Charter High School

== Public middle schools ==
- Carnage Middle School
- Carroll Middle School
- Centennial Campus Middle School
- Daniels Middle School
- Dillard Drive Middle School
- Durant Road Middle School
- East Millbrook Middle School
- East Wake Middle School
- The Exploris School is a charter school founded in 1997 and located in downtown Raleigh, currently serving grades K-8 between the middle and elementary schools.
- Holly Ridge Middle School
- Leesville Road Middle School
- John W. Ligon Middle School is a magnet middle school. Ligon is located in downtown Raleigh on Lenior Street.
- Magellan Charter School
- Martin Middle School
- Moore Square Museums Magnet Middle School
- West Millbrook Middle School
- Ligon GT Magnet Middle School

== Public elementary schools ==
- Bugg Elementary
- Brooks Elementary
- Casa Esperanza Montessori Charter School and Preschool is a public dual-language English / Spanish Montessori school for grades K-8 and a private dual-language preschool for children ages 3 and 4.
- Combs Elementary
- Emma Conn Elementary
- Durant Road Elementary
- Fuller GT Magnet Elementary
- Green Year Round Elementary
- Jeffreys Grove Elementary
- Lacy Elementary
- The Exploris School is a charter school which expanded to elementary starting the school year of 2014-2015. It currently serves K-8 between the elementary and middle schools.
- Leesville Road Elementary
- Lucille Hunter Elementary School
- Lynn Road Elementary
- Magellan Charter School
- Mary P. Douglas Elementary
- North Ridge Elementary
- Olds Elementary
- Partnership Elementary
- Pleasant Union Elementary
- Poe Elementary
- Reedy Creek Elementary
- Root Elementary
- Stough Elementary
- Swift Creek Elementary
- Underwood Elementary
- Vena Wilburn Elementary
- Washington Elementary
- Wiley International Magnet Elementary
- York Elementary
