= Chuck Davis (dancer) =

American dancer and choreographer

- Chuck Davis in 2010
- Born: Charles Rudolph Davis; January 1, 1937; Raleigh, North Carolina, U.S.
- Died: May 14, 2017 (aged 80); Durham, North Carolina, U.S.
- Education: John W. Ligon High School; Howard University
- Occupations: Dancer, choreographer, activist

Charles Rudolph Davis, also known as Baba Chuck Davis, (January 1, 1937 – May 14, 2017) was an American dancer and choreographer whose work focused on traditional African dance. He was the founder of DanceAfrica, the Chuck Davis Dance Company, and the African American Dance Ensemble.

== Early life ==
Charles Rudolph Davis was born on January 1, 1937, in Raleigh, North Carolina to Tony and Ethel Davis. He graduated from John W. Ligon High School in 1954 and went on to serve in the United States Navy for two years, also working as a hospital corpsman at Bethesda Naval Hospital in Maryland. He received nursing training at George Washington University Hospital. Davis became inspired by African dance while working at the Naval Hospital, dancing to live Afro-Cuban mambo and salsa music at the Dunbar Hotel while he was off-duty. The hotel's booking manager asked him to join the hotel's nightclub revue, leading to him joining an African dance troop. He went on to attend Howard University to study theatre and dance; training in ballet, jazz, and tap. He also studied Caribbean dance technique with Geoffrey Holder and Lorna Hodges-Mafata. In 1963, he took part in the March on Washington.

== Career ==
Davis founded the Chuck Davis Dance Company in New York City in 1968, DanceAfrica in 1977, and the African American Dance Ensemble in Durham, North Carolina in 1983. While living in New York, he was an instructor at the Brooklyn Academy of Music. In 1974, he joined the faculty of the American Dance Festival. He traveled to Africa over fifty times to study African dance techniques. He served as a panelist for the National Endowment of the Arts and was a recipient of the AARP Certificate of Excellence, the North Carolina Dance Alliance Award, the North Carolina Artist Award, the North Carolina Award in Fine Arts, and was inducted into the North Carolina Order of the Long Leaf Pine. He served on the board of the North Carolina Arts Council from 1991 until his death in 2017. Davis worked with the NC Arts Council to develop and launch the NC Black Folk Heritage Tour in the late 1980s and early 1990s. In 1996 he received a $100,000 grant from the National Dance Residency Program for the African American Dance Ensemble. In 1998 he was awarded an honorary doctorate from Medgar Evers College. He was an adjunct professor at North Carolina Central University in the Department of Theatre and Duke University. Davis was awarded two Bessie Awards including a Lifetime Achievement Award in 2014.

Along with the Durham dance scene, Davis was an instrumental leader in the African-American community. He led the Hayti Heritage Center's annual celebration of Kwanzaa and served as the grand marshal of one of Durham's first Mardi Gras parades.

Davis also performed as a featured dancer for the Eleo Pomare Dance Company.

== Death and legacy ==
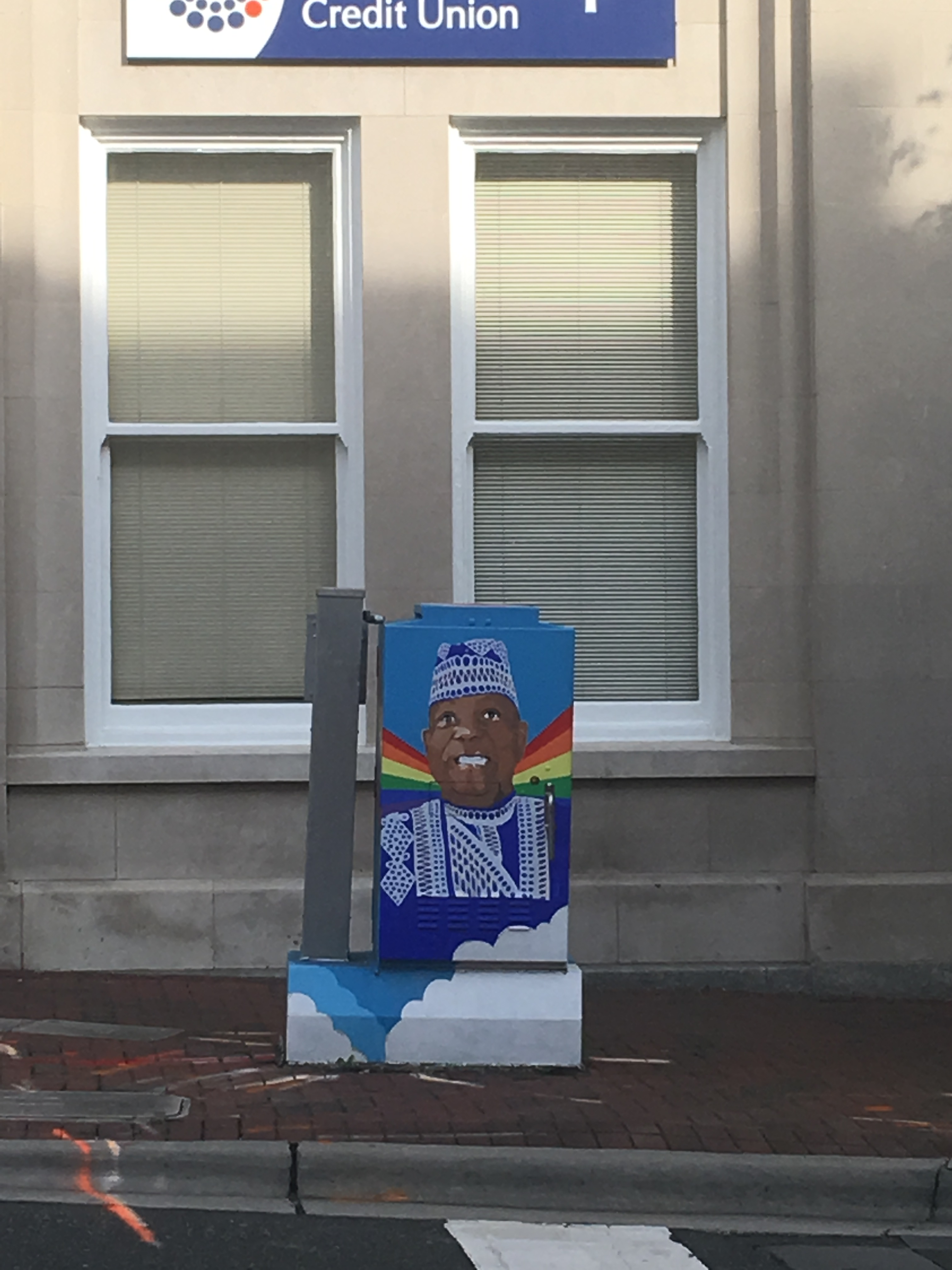
Painting of Davis in downtown Durham.

Davis died of cancer on May 14, 2017. A visitation was held on June 2, 2017, at Fisher Memorial United Holy Church in Durham. A community celebration of his life was held the same day at the Hayti Heritage Center. The funeral was held on June 3, 2017, at Union Baptist Church in Durham.

The legacy of Davis was honored at the 48th annual Bimbé Festival and at the 82nd season of the American Dance Festival in 2017.

In July 2019 Davis was posthumously inducted into the Wake County Public School System's Hall of Fame.

Davis was recognized as a Main Honoree by the Sesquicentennial Honors Commission at the Durham 150 Closing Ceremony in Durham on November 2, 2019. The posthumous recognition was bestowed upon 29 individuals "whose dedication, accomplishments and passion have helped shape Durham in important ways."
