= Lucille Hunter Elementary School =

Historic elementary school in North Carolina

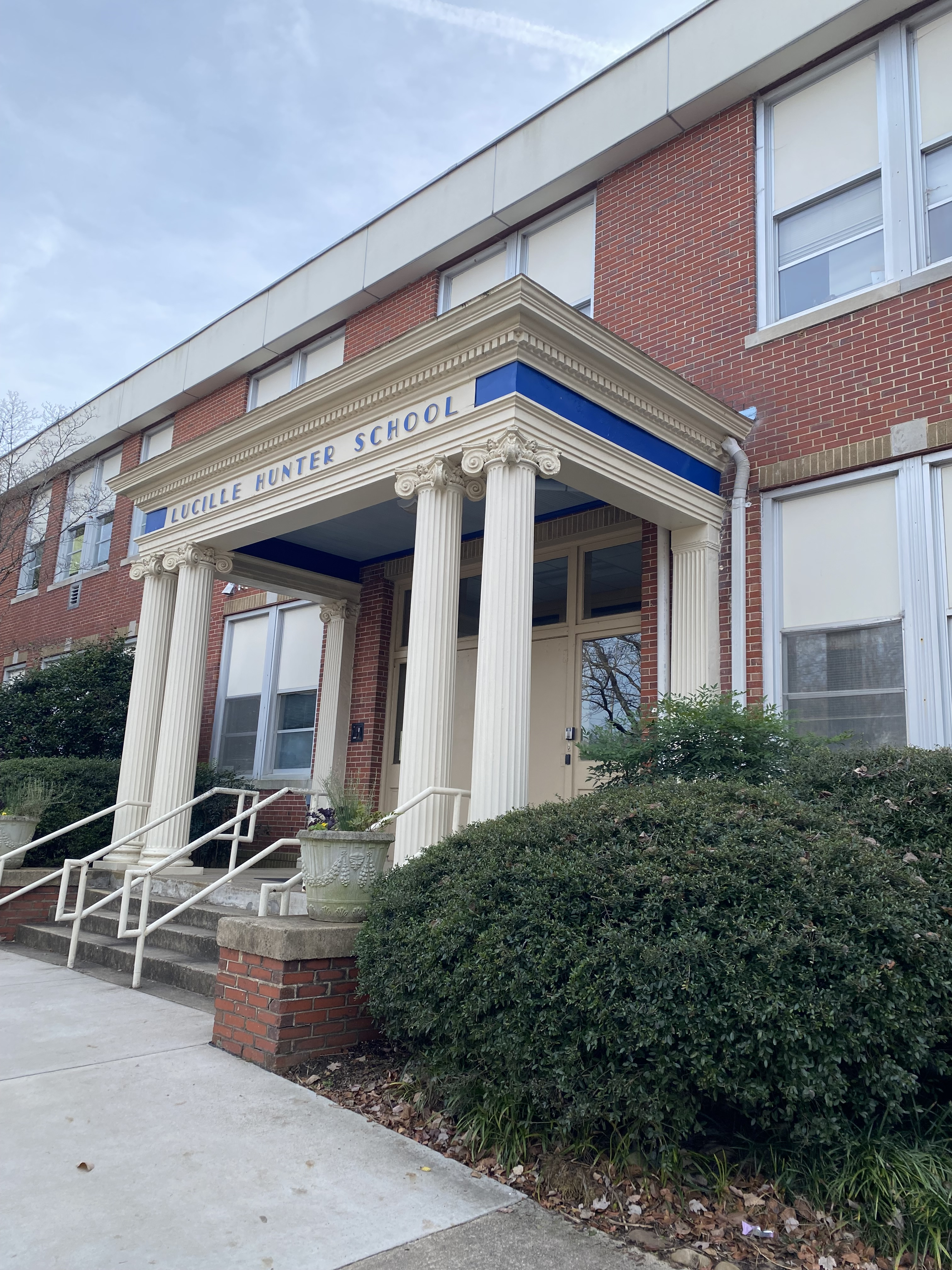
- View of the front entrance to the school in 2024

Location
- 1018 East Davie Street; Raleigh, North Carolina 27601; United States; 35°46′28″N 78°37′22″W

Information
- School type: Public (Magnet, GT, AIG) Primary
- Motto: "It's happening at Hunter!"
- Established: 1927
- School district: Wake County Public Schools
- Principal: H. Trent Evans (interim)
- Enrollment: 700+
- Campus type: Urban
- Colors: Navy blue and gold
- Mascot: Eagle
- Website: Hunter Elementary

Lucille Hunter GT/ AIG Basics Magnet Elementary School, also known as Hunter Magnet Elementary School, formerly Lucille Hunter School, is a historically black elementary school for academically intellectually gifted students in downtown Raleigh, North Carolina. Hunter Elementary offers Gifted & Talented curriculum and was Wake County's first magnet school. The school was the first school in North Carolina to be named after an African-American educator.

== History ==
Hunter Elementary is named after Lucille Hunter who, born in 1863 to former slaves in Wilmington, North Carolina, was an educator that taught in Raleigh's segregated black schools for over forty years, including a position as a third grade teacher at the now demolished Washington School. At the time of her death in 1926, she was teaching at disestablished Crosby-Garfield school. The decision to name the school after Hunter was reached after her former students and colleagues lobbied the Raleigh Township Committee.

From 1833 to 1840, the ten acres (4.0 ha) of land that the school was later built on was a quarry that yielded stone for the North Carolina State Capitol. Later, the plot was used for public executions. The Raleigh school board purchased the land on July 14, 1926.

Construction of the school was completed in 1927, funded by money from a bond issue. At the time of its opening, racial segregation laws were in place in North Carolina. Hunter served black students from first grade to seventh grade, and had black faculty and staff. Most of the school's books were handed down from white institutions, and fundraisers occasionally had to be held to purchase new ones. The Great Depression in 1929 brought economic hardship on students, and some had to drop out in order to support their families.

In 1935 the Garfield section of the Crosby-Garfield School in Raleigh was damaged by a fire. Students attended classes at Hunter until repairs were finished in 1939.

By 1953, the seventh grade class was moved to Washington Graded and High School, leaving Hunter with only grade one through six.

Early in the morning of January 22, 1965, a large fire engulfed Hunter, completely destroying the school's main wing. Teachers were awoken and came to save records from the blaze. The cafeteria and gymnasium were not seriously damaged. Two 14-year-old students were later held responsible for burglarizing the school and igniting the drapes in the auditorium. They were reprimanded and sent to a reform school. Classes were held in Hunter's basement and at John W. Ligon Junior-Senior High School until repairs were completed.

In 1971, all Wake County schools were desegregated and Hunter became a center for sixth-grade students. At the time, single grade schools were seen as a less controversial way to get communities to agree to integration. Needed repairs that had been previously ignored were quickly addressed. In 1978, after the merger of the Raleigh City and Wake County Public School Systems, Hunter became the county's first magnet elementary school, serving grades kindergarten through six, offering a program for academically gifted children. This was seen as a way to attract students from West Raleigh to remedy the school's falling enrollment. Hunter was the first Wake County school to have teachers certified to instruct Gifted & Talented classes. In the 1980s the sixth grade was dropped from the school.

In the 1990s the school was featured in a broadcast on ABC's Good Morning America, where psychologist Robert Sternberg's theories on intelligence were tested on students.

Hunter celebrated its 75th anniversary during the 2002-2003 school year and obtained a portrait of Lucille Hunter, now displayed in the school's media center.

== Awards ==
In 2013, Hunter received a School of Distinction merit award from the Magnet Schools of America (MSA) trade organization.

In 2014, Hunter received a bronze award from Advocates for Health in Action. That same year it received a School of Excellence merit award from the MSA.

In 2016, Hunter received the School of Excellence Award from the MSA.

== Notable alumni ==
- Maycie Herrington, history conservator
