= Beth Cochran =

Canadian-American educator and basketball player

Personal information
- Born: June 11, 1964 (age 61) Hamiota Municipality, Manitoba, Canada

Career information
- High school: Hamiota Collegiate
- College: University of Winnipeg (1982–1987)

Career history
- 1986-1987: Canada women's national basketball team

Career highlights
- Great Plains Athletic Conference Player of the Year (1984, 1986, 1987); Canadian Interuniversity Athletic Union All-Canadian (1983, 1984, 1985, 1986, 1987); Canadian Interuniversity Athletic Union Silver Medalist (1984); Manitoba Sports Hall of Fame and Museum inductee (1996); 1986 FIBA World Championship for Women Bronze Medalist (1986); Pan American Games Bronze Medalist (1987)

Alice Beth Cochran (born June 11, 1964) is a Canadian-American educator, educational consultant, and former basketball player. She played for the Winnipeg Wesmen from 1982 to 1987 and served as team captain from 1985 to 1987. Cochran was selected as a Canadian Interuniversity Athletic Union All-Canadian every year of her collegiate career, and led the Winnipeg Wesmen to four national championship tournaments. She was the Great Plains Athletic Conference Player of the Year in 1984, 1986, and 1987. Cochran holds the women's records for leading scorer and leading in career rebounds at the University of Winnipeg. She joined the Canada women's national basketball team and won bronze medals at the 1986 FIBA World Championship for Women and at the 1987 Pan American Games. In 1996, Cochran was inducted into the Manitoba Sports Hall of Fame and Museum.

Cochran is the senior director of magnet and curriculum enhancement programs for the Wake County Public School System and previously served as the principal at John W. Ligon Magnet Middle School and William G. Enloe Magnet High School in Raleigh, North Carolina.

== Early life and education ==
Cochran was born on June 11, 1964, in Hamiota, Canada. She graduated from Hamiota Collegiate High School in 1982. She went on to obtain a degree in education from the University of Winnipeg and a doctorate in education from North Carolina State University.

== Basketball ==
Cochran played basketball for the Hamiota Collegiate Huskies.

She went on to play at the University of Winnipeg and was team captain from 1985 to 1987. She holds the University of Winnipeg women's basketball record for all-time leading scorer, with 4,079 career points, and the record for leading in career rebounds, with 2,056. She also holds the record for most rebounds in a single season, with 563 rebounds during the 1982 to 1983 season.

Although she never won a national championship, Cochran led the Winnipeg Wesmen to four national championships. She was named a Canadian Interuniversity Athletic Union All-Canadian every year of her collegiate career and won a silver medal from the union during the 1983-1984 season. Cochran was named the Great Plains Athletic Conference player of the year in 1984, 1986, and 1987.

Cochran made the Canada women's national basketball team as a forward, playing in the 1986 FIBA World Championship for Women, where the team placed third, and in the 1987 Pan American Games, where they placed third again.

She was inducted into the Manitoba Sports Hall of Fame and Museum in 1996.

== Educational career ==
Cochran was a principal of John W. Ligon Middle School and William G. Enloe Magnet High School in Raleigh, North Carolina.

Cochran works as an educational consultant, doing grant management with the Magnet Schools Assistance Program, for which she was awarded the Merit Award of Excellence and Distinction and a National Magnet Certficiation. She worked with nine schools to help them receive the Magnet National Certification Schools for Standards Excellence awards in the first cohort and nine other schools in additional cohorts. In Wake County, Cochran also initiated the conversion of thirteen traditional public schools into magnet schools and helped revise the magnet curriculum for eight magnet schools. She has served as a consultant for the Magnet Schools Assistance Program in Louisville, Charlotte, Greensboro, and Osseo and Minneapolis.

She is the senior director of magnet and curriculum enhancement programs for the Wake County Public School System.
