= Phillips High School =

Phillips High School may refer to:

- Phillips High School (Alabama) in Bear Creek
- Wendell Phillips Academy High School
- Mary E. Phillips High School
- Phillips High School (Wisconsin)
