= Wake Young Men's Leadership Academy =

Secondary all boys public school in Raleigh, North Carolina, United States

Coordinates: 35.7784°N 78.6295°W

Information
- Established: 2012; 14 years ago
- School district: Wake County Public School System
- Principal: Xavier King
- Grades: 6-13
- Gender: Boys
- Enrollment: 262 (2024–2025)

Wake Young Men's Leadership Academy (WYMLA) is a public secondary school for boys in Raleigh, North Carolina. It is a part of Wake County Public School System.

It has grades 6–13, with the former Thompson School building in Downtown Raleigh hosting most grades, except Early College students (grades 11 through 13.) Early College students temporarily attended the campus of Wake Tech's "Scott Northern Campus" for the 2024-25 school year, having previously (2012-2024) been at their former partner's campus at St. Augustine's University (SAU). Since August of 2025, students have attended Shaw University.

== History ==
WYMLA opened in 2012, with Ian Solomon as the first principal. Xavier King took over the role of principal in 2019.

Originally, in 2011 the school system proposed creating single gender schools. Initially they were to be located at William Peace University, but that institution chose not to host them. The ex-Thompson School held all Wake Young Men's students until St. Augustine's formed a partnership in 2013. From 2013 to 2024, alongside their partner school, Wake Young Women's Leadership Academy (WYWLA), early college students attended SAU. In 2016 the first class graduated. After financial issues resulted in SAU's loss of accreditation in November 2023, the partnership was put into question. After subsequent appeals and many meetings between WCPSS and SAU officers, the decision was made to terminate the partnership. During the 2024-25 school year, students attended college courses through Wake Technical Community College, while district leaders were establishing a potential new relationship with a different university. During this time, students earned credits through the state's Career & College Promise (CCP), rather than an establishment of a new "Early College" under North Carolina's Cooperative Innovative High Schools program, which was to be established with a new partner. The NC General Assembly passed HB 900 intending to expedite that process, and maintain the status of "Early College" for the leadership academies. The Superintendent and School board eventually announced that the process had narrowed to two schools, and they had chosen Shaw University over North Carolina State University, with the decision announced in a mid-July 2024 WCPSS board meeting. Since the 2025-26 school year, early college students have attended Shaw.

== Athletics ==
Since 2016, students have been allowed to play sports at other schools if the sports are not offered at WYMLA, but that year a board member proposed changing the rule. Students are still allowed to participate at nearby High Schools.
