= Wake Young Women's Leadership Academy =

Girls' school in Raleigh, North Carolina

Coordinates: 35.77936°N 78.65917°W

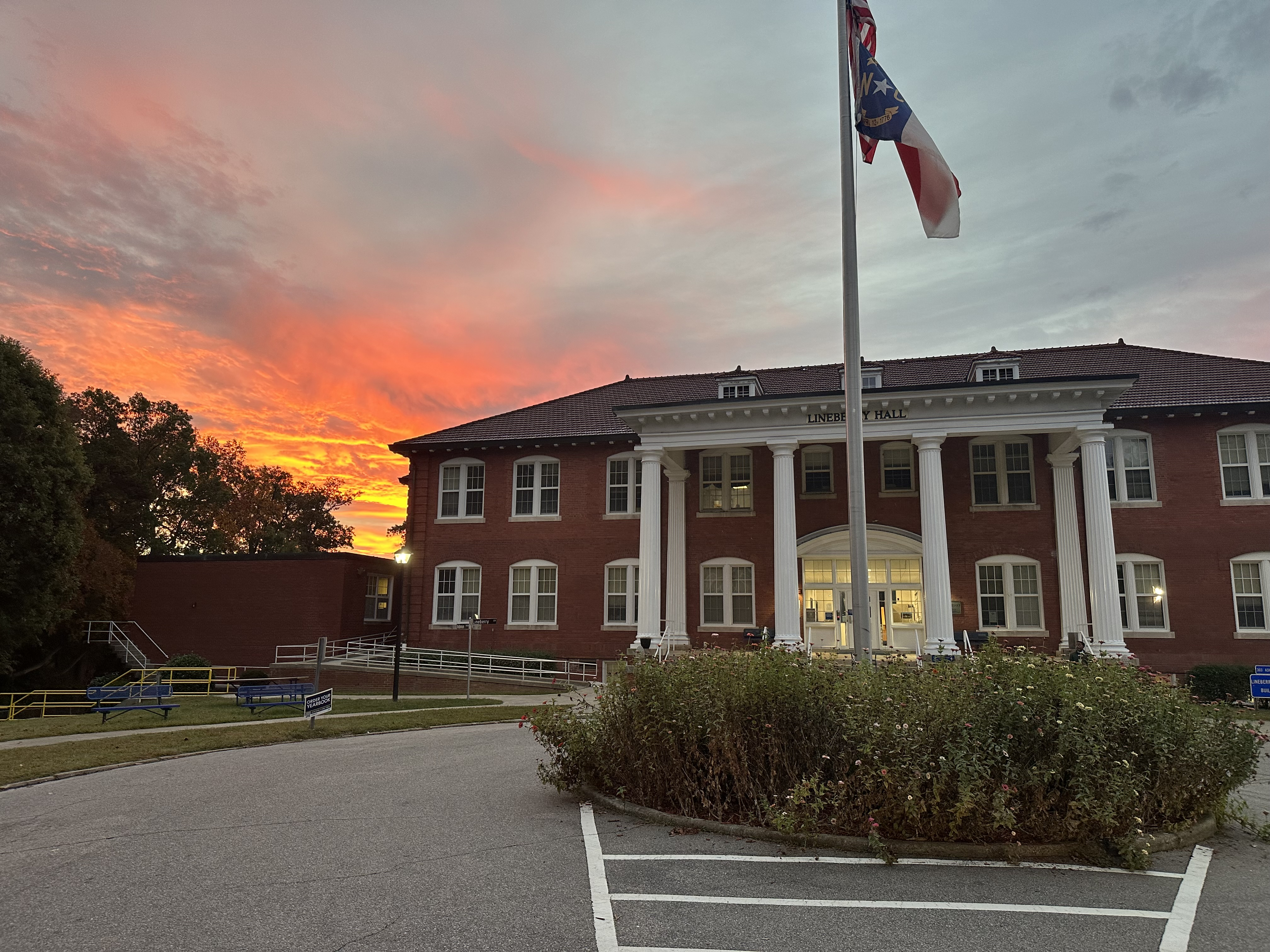
Exterior view of WYWLA

Wake Young Women's Leadership Academy (WYWLA) is a public secondary school for girls in Raleigh, North Carolina. It is a part of Wake County Public School System. The school's current principal since 2022 is Dr. Mariah Walker.

It has grades 6–12, with the Governor Morehead School's campus housing grades 6–10. The school's mascot, an OWL, is an acronym for "Outstanding Woman Leader." From 2013 to 2024, it participated in an Early College partnership with St. Augustine University; then in a temporary basis with Wake Tech Community College for the 2024-25 school year (after SAU faced accreditation challenges), eventually selecting another HBCU, Shaw University as their new partner beginning August 2025.

In the U.S. News & World Report's 2024 Best High Schools List, WYWLA was ranked #36 in North Carolina and #967 in the United States.

== History ==
In 2011 the school system proposed creating single gender schools. WYWLA and its partner all-boys school, WYMLA, were established in 2012. The school opened with Teresa Pierre as the first Principal. She was replaced by Carla Jernigan-Baker in 2015, before Principal Walker took over in 2022.

The school makes active efforts to bring in major speakers, and form community partnerships.Notable events include author, former first daughter, Chelsea Clinton visiting the campus in 2015, and an early screening of the film "Pioneers in Skirts" for SXSW EDU conference.

=== Campuses and University Partners ===
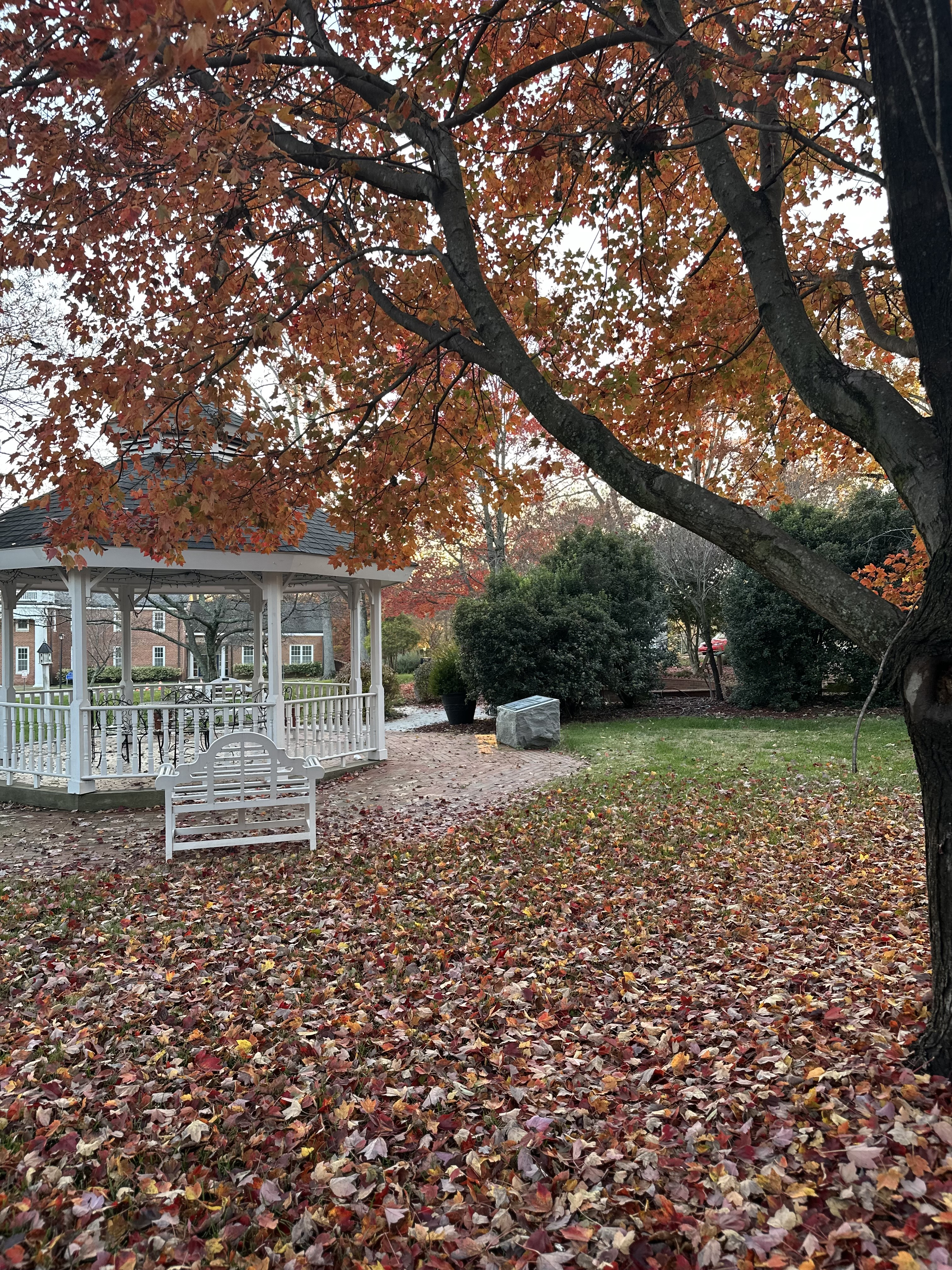
Governor of Morehead School central gardens in Autumn

Initially they were to be located at William Peace University, but that institution chose not to host them. The Governor Morehead campus held all Wake Young Women's students until they formed a partnership with St. Augustine's University (SAU) in 2013. In 2016 the first class graduated. Juniors and Seniors attended classes on that campus with equivalently aged WYMLA students until Spring of 2024. After financial issues resulted in SAU's loss of accreditation in November 2023, the partnership was put into question. After subsequent appeals and many meetings between WCPSS and SAU officers, the decision was made to terminate the partnership. Starting in the Fall semester of 2024, Students attended college courses through Wake Technical Community College, while district leaders established potential new relationships with a different partner University. The temporary relationship with Wake Tech, was initially set up through a different funding mechanism, earning credits through the state's Career & College Promise (CCP), not an establishment of a new "Early College" under North Carolina's Cooperative Innovative High Schools program, which they anticipated to establish with a future partner. The NC General Assembly passed HB 900 intending to expedite that process, and maintain the status of "Early College" for the leadership academies. In June 2024, the Superintendent and School board stated that the process has narrowed the future partner choice down to Shaw University and North Carolina State University. Shaw was eventually chosen as the new partner, beginning in the 2025-2026 school year. Leaders stated that the decision was ultimately decided based on available space that Shaw was able to make available, and the collaboration allowed.

Additionally, the school has variously worked with other community partners on specific efforts. In 2017 a "Summer Internship Program" was developed with Meredith College, where a combined group of Professors, undergraduate researchers, and high school students work collaboratively on ongoing research on sustainability for the college.

== Admissions ==
Each year the school admits 50–60 students in the 6th grade and smaller numbers in other grades.
