= Maycie Herrington =

Black history conservator (1918–2016)

- Born: Maycie Copeland; November 7, 1918; Raleigh, North Carolina
- Died: May 24, 2016 (aged 97)
- Education: Washington High School
- Alma mater: St. Augustine's University
- Occupations: Black history conservator, community volunteer
- Spouse: Aaron Herrington
- Children: Ann Herrington, Kay M. Herrington
- Parent(s): Dicie Copeland; Thomas Copeland

Maycie Herrington (November 7, 1918 – May 24, 2016) was an American history conservator, social worker, and community volunteer known for her work to preserve the history of the Tuskegee Airmen. She was involved with the Tuskegee Airmen from World War II, when she worked for the Red Cross while her husband Aaron trained to become a fighter pilot. Herrington died on May 24, 2016, at the age of 97.

== Biography ==
=== Early life ===
Maycie Herrington (née Copeland) was born to Thomas and Dicie Copeland on November 7, 1918, in Raleigh, North Carolina. Herrington went to the grade school associated with St. Augustine College and then enrolled into the Lucille Hunter School. She received her high school education at Washington High School, graduating 1936.

=== College years ===
Herrington returned to the St. Augustine's University campus to attend college. During her time as an undergraduate, she met Aaron Herrington, a fellow student. She graduated in 1940 with a Bachelor of Science degree.

=== Marriage and children ===
Three years after graduating from college, Herrington married Aaron Herrington in 1943. Their daughter Ann was born in 1944. A second child Kay Marie was to be welcomed in 1956 after the couple moved to California.

=== Tuskegee Airmen experience ===
Shortly after their wedding, Aaron Herrington received orders to report to Tuskegee, Alabama, by the military for training as a fighter pilot as part of the Tuskegee Airmen in 1943. Maycie Herrington quit her job at Mechanics and Farmers Bank where she had been working as a bookkeeper in order to join her husband in Tuskegee, Alabama.

She went to work for the Red Cross and interacted with many of the Tuskegee Airmen.

Following the death of her husband in 1995, Herrington assumed his position in the Tuskegee Airmen, Inc and since 1996 has continued his work to memorialize the Tuskegee Airmen. As part of these efforts, she designed and produced a series of trading cards documenting individual members of the Tuskegee Airmen. She became secretary of the organization in 1998.

=== Social work ===
Following World War II, the Herringtons moved to Long Beach, California. Maycie Herrington was hired by the Bureau for Public Assistance as a social worker in 1949, a position that she held for more than 30 years. In this role, she worked with the Long Beach Area Welfare Planning Council United Way. Maycie and Aaron had a second daughter born to them, Kay Marie Herrington, in 1956. She also organized the summer camps and Christmas activities run by the bureau. She retired in 1981.

== Awards ==
- Hannah G. Solomon Award
- Women Helping Women Award
- Rick Racker Woman of the Year Award
- National Conference for Community and Justice Humanitarian Award
