= Anne-Claire Niver =

21st-century American singer-songwriter

Anne-Claire
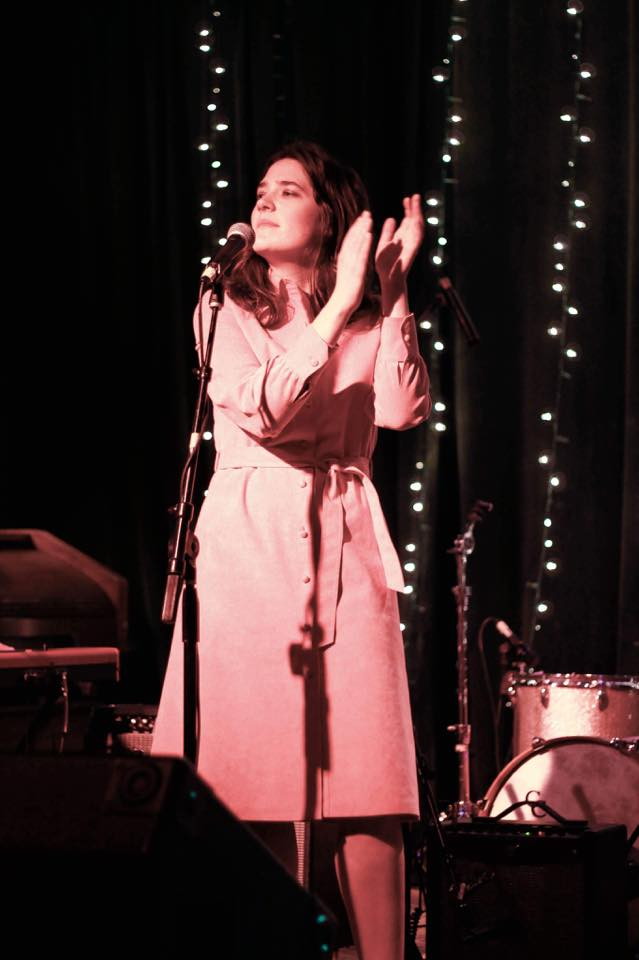
- Niver performing in 2018

Background information
- Born: May 5, 1990 (age 36)
- Origin: Greensboro, North Carolina; United States
- Genres: alternative rock, indie pop, indie rock, jazz pop
- Occupation: singer-songwriter
- Years active: 2014–present
- Website: anneclairemusic.com

Anne-Claire Niver (born May 5, 1990), known professionally as Anne-Claire, is an American singer-songwriter and recording artist. A North Carolina native, Niver studied opera at the University of North Carolina at Greensboro before starting her career. She is a former lead singer of the band Anne-Claire and the Wild Mystics, which disbanded in 2016. She has since performed as a solo artist.

== Early life and education ==
Niver was born and raised in North Carolina. She spent the first part of her childhood in Greensboro, where she was active in the Greensboro Youth Chorus. After her family moved to Raleigh when she was ten years old, she began singing in the Capital City Girls Choir. She was a drama student at William G. Enloe GT/IB Center for the Humanities, Sciences, and the Arts, graduating in 2008. She obtained a Bachelor of Music degree in vocal performance and classical singing from the University of North Carolina at Greensboro's School of Music, Theatre, and Dance in 2013. While in college, Niver also worked in the music program at First Presbyterian Church of Greensboro. She studied under Carla LeFevre and received additional training from Meredith Monk. Niver twice attended the Brevard Music Center's summer program, where she sang the roles of Blanche in Dialogues des Carmélites and Jenny Diver in Threepenny Opera.

After college, Niver moved to Thailand where she worked as an English language teacher. Niver later moved back to the United States to receive treatment for an eating disorder, which she had been suffering from since her adolescent years. Niver then worked at Prodigal Farm, a goat farm in Rougemont, overseeing the care of hundreds of goats and assisting in the farm's cheese production.

== Music career ==
Niver's style is influenced by her love of "soul divas" and she has cited PJ Harvey, Frank Ocean, k.d. lang, Björk, Lucius, and Neko Case as musical influences. She began her music career after her future producer and band member, Alex Bingham, encouraged her to share her work. She had recently moved back to the United States from Thailand and had been recording music with the software program GarageBand. While at college, Niver said she felt she was "always singing someone else's music", which had encouraged her to start songwriting.

Niver fronted the band Anne-Claire and the Wild Mystics, composed of Charles Cleaver on keyboard, David Dollar and Ryan Johnson on guitar, Bingham on bass, and Dan Faust on drums. Her first album, named Anne-Claire Niver and the Wild Mystics after the band, was released in 2015. She partnered with Kris Hilbert at Legitimate Business in Greensboro to produce the album.

In August 2018 Niver opened for Lilly Hiatt at the American Tobacco Campus in Durham. Later that year she provided back-up vocals for an album by Porch Light Apothecary.

Niver has also performed as a chanteuse at the O. Henry Hotel in Greensboro as part of their jazz series.

The track Give it Up, which was later featured on her second album, was released as a single on July 20, 2018. The album was recorded in January and February 2018 at Fidelitorium Studioes in Kernersville with recording engineer Jeff Crawford and was produced by Bingham. Niver's second album, I Still Look For You, was released for digital download on July 31, 2018. The formal release was celebrated with a release party and performance on August 3, 2018 at the Carolina Theatre of Greensboro. The album, centered on loss and the stages of grief, was inspired by the loss of Niver's grandmother who died from a heart attack in 2016. A single on the album titled Second Time references a dream Niver later had about being visited by her grandmother, which she saw as a reflection of her own grief. The day before she was scheduled to record the song, her grandfather died.

In September 2019 Niver released the single Mosquitos, which she said she wrote while hiking in the DuPont State Forest after a bad breakup. The music video for Mosquitos, also released in September, was directed by Wilson Hester and filmed by Peyton Lea.

In February 2021, Niver released the single Jean Jacket and a remix of the single, called I Remember.

== Discography ==
=== Albums ===
- Anne-Claire and the Wild Mystics (2015)
- I Still Look For You (2018)

=== Singles ===
- Second Time (2017)
- Behind Me (2018)
- Give it Up (2018)
- Mosquitos (2019)
- Jean Jacket (2021)
- I Remember (2021)

== Personal life ==
Niver lives in Carrboro, North Carolina with her husband and former bandmate, Charles Cleaver. In 2020 she endorsed Bernie Sanders in his 2020 presidential campaign, and canvassed for him at the University of North Carolina at Chapel Hill on March 2, 2020.
