= Wake Early College of Health and Sciences =

American public, magnet, secondary school in North Carolina

Location
- 2901 Holston Lane; Raleigh, North Carolina 27610; United States
- Coordinates: 35°47′06″N 78°35′05″W

Information
- School type: Public, magnet, secondary
- Founded: 2006 (20 years ago)
- Category: Health and Science
- CEEB code: 343249
- NCES School ID: 370472002866
- Principal: Lisa Cummings
- Faculty: 12.5 FTEs
- Enrollment: 336 (as of 2022–23)
- Student to teacher ratio: 27.0:1
- Hours in school day: 7:25 a.m. – 2:10 p.m.
- Degrees: High school diploma, Associate's degree, a variety of certifications
- Website: www.wcpss.net/healthscienceec

Wake Early College of Health and Sciences High School (more commonly known as Wake Early College or WECHS) is a small secondary school program (grades 9–13, with up to one year of post-secondary education) located on two Wake Tech sites.

== Governance ==
This school is one of six early college high schools in Wake County. The others are Vernon Malone College and Career Academy, Wake STEM Early College High School, Wake Early College of Information and Biotechnologies, Wake Young Men's Leadership Academy, and Wake Young Women's Leadership Academy (the latter two schools also serve middle school students).

== School structure ==
As of the 2022–23 school year, the school had an enrollment of 336 students and 12.5 classroom teachers (on an FTE basis), for a student–teacher ratio of 27.0:1. There were 111 students (33.0% of enrollment) eligible for free lunch and 21 (6.3% of students) eligible for reduced-cost lunch.

== Curriculum ==
The school offers a five-year program in which students can earn a high school diploma and, in some cases, an Associate degree. It is a public magnet high school under the Wake County Public School System and operates in conjunction with Wake Tech.
