= Mary E. Phillips High School =

American Alternative school in North Carolina

Location
- 1923 Milburnie Road; Raleigh, North Carolina 27610; United States; 35°47′18″N 78°36′58″W

Information
- School type: Alternative
- Established: 1975
- CEEB code: 343206
- Principal: Jeremy Barefoot
- Teaching staff: 29.46 (FTE)
- Enrollment: 125 (2023–2024)
- Student to teacher ratio: 4.24
- Website: wcpss.net/phillipshs

Mary E. Phillips High School is an alternative education high school in eastern Raleigh, North Carolina. It is located east of St. Augustine's college and less than a mile from William G. Enloe High School. The school is a non-traditional high school 9 through 12 that focuses on students who have not been successful in traditional school programs. These struggles can be with attendance, academic performance, or minor behavioral issues. In the 2016–17 school year, Phillips High School capped at approximately 170 students. It employs approximately 30 teachers with a total staff of 40.

The current principal is Jeremy Barefoot, who began at Phillips in July 2026.

== School features ==
Phillips High School provides additional academic supports to help students be successful. These include an instructional focus using 21st Century Skills, real world connections, and problem based learning. Technology use is infused in each classroom. Other supports built into the school's day include LIFE and Seminar. LIFE is a course at the beginning of the day in which students work on real life skills, such as applying for jobs, study skills, and discussing issues facing each student outside of school. The second part of this support is Seminar. This is the academic component of the support system. In seminar, students are able to work on their homework, complete missing assignments, and seek extra help from their teachers. This time is built into the schedule, and benefits all of the students at the school. Class sizes are kept to a maximum of 15, while most have fewer than 10. This is to ensure that all students individual social, emotional and academic needs are met. Hands-on, individualized instructions as well as student support are the main reasons students experience success at Phillips.

Students also work on state minimum credit requirements, meaning that students need a minimum of 22 credits (typically) to graduate. This allows someone who came into Phillips behind a way to catch up, and graduate on time. While it doesn't make it any easier, it does remove obstacles on the path toward graduation.

== Schedule ==
Phillips High School, like most other Wake County Schools operates on the traditional calendar provided by the district. Students follows a modified block schedule from 7:25 am and 2:25 pm from Monday to Friday. Students in the Extended Day Program dismiss at 6:35, Monday through Thursday. Friday can be used for remediation/enrichment for extended day students if they have transportation.

Phillips High is unique in its support of an Extended Day Program. The program supports students who struggle in larger environments, and those who like the freedom of coming in later each day. The program runs Monday–Friday, beginning at 10:30am and dismisses at 5:35 pm. Transportation is provided both to and from school throughout Wake County. Lunch is also provided daily as students arrive at school.

== Uniform ==
Phillips does have a uniform policy for students. Pants must be khaki in color and material, and shirts and jackets must be solid black, gray or white. Shoes can be any color other than solid red or blue, and must have a strap to hold them on your ankle—no slides or flip flops.

== Application ==
Students interested in attending Phillips High School are required to submit an application for admission. Once reviewed, a decision is made and the student and parents are notified of the decision by letter. Students must then complete an orientation, and withdraw from their base school in order to begin at Phillips.
