= Ligon Middle School (North Carolina) =

Coordinates: 35.7721°N 78.6264°W

John W. Ligon GT Magnet Middle School
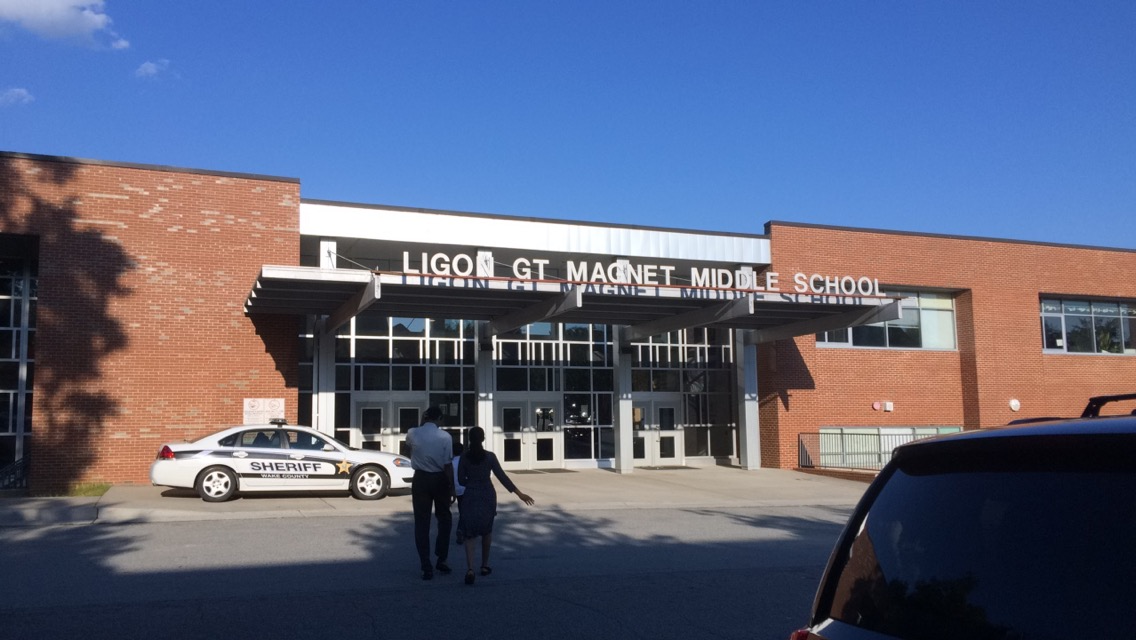
- Entrance to Ligon's auditorium

Location
- 706 East Lenoir Street; Raleigh, North Carolina; United States

Information
- School type: Public (Magnet)
- Founded: 1953 (73 years ago)
- Focus: Arts; Academia; Multiculturalism
- Principal: Darren Williams
- Teaching staff: ~95
- Enrollment: ~1000
- Education system: Wake County Public School System
- Schedule type: A/B Block Schedule
- Schedule: 7:35am - 2:20pm
- Hours in school day: 6 hrs 45 minutes
- Colors: Blue and Gold
- Mascot: Little Blues
- Yearbook: The Echo
- Feeder to: William G. Enloe High School
- Assistant principals: L. Jackson Glasgow; Barbara Liggett; Brandon McRae
- Website: Ligon Magnet Middle School

John W. Ligon GT/AIG Basics Magnet Middle School, formerly John W. Ligon Junior-Senior High School, is a public magnet middle school in the Wake County Public School System located in the Chavis Heights neighborhood of Raleigh, North Carolina. It was historically an all black high school in Raleigh until it was integrated in 1971.

== History ==
=== High school ===
The groundbreaking ceremony for John W. Ligon High School was held in November 1951. The school opened in 1953, replacing Washington Graded and High School as the only all black secondary education institution in Raleigh, North Carolina. The overall building costs amounted to $1 million, making it the largest school construction project in the state at the time. It was named after John William Ligon, an educator, local pastor and interim principal at Washington. The school's books were supplied secondhand from its white counterpart, Broughton High School. Ligon was seen as model for black education throughout the state, attracting a large number of students and an educated teaching staff from the local black colleges. By the late 1960s it possessed a higher percentage of teachers with graduate degrees than any of Raleigh's three white schools.

=== Middle school ===
Ligon served as the city's only black high school until 1971, when it was desegregated and subsequently converted into a junior high school. In the late 1970s, officials considered closing the school, but this was met with opposition from alumni and Ligon continued to operate. In 1982, Ligon was formally consolidated into the new Wake County Public School System and became involved in the Magnet Program. The Crosby-Garfield school in Raleigh merged into Ligon at the same time. Between 1994 and 1995, computers and laserdisc players were installed in many of the school's classrooms. 360 students were educated on the use of ClarisWorks, HyperStudio, and MacGlobe software. Teachers were trained in the areas of data management, email, and multimedia. In the early 2000s, the school underwent major renovations and expansions, including the construction of new hallways, a baseball field, and additional classrooms.

=== Future ===
At a school board meeting on December 16, 2025, three options were presented for the school's future. Option 1, renovating the building, would cost $102.3 million and take more than four years, with students moved to mobile classrooms on the campus. A disadvantage was that the magnet program would be disrupted. Also, the school would still be small and have traffic problems. Option 2, rebuilding in a new location, would cost $148 million and take more than 4 years. Option 3, a new building on the current athletic fields and tearing the old building down, would cost $121.8 million and take less than 4 years. Alumni oppose this option even though much of the original building is gone already.

The $121 million plan was approved in May 2026, to be paid for with a $680 million school construction bond that voters would have to approve. A lobby would include items representing the school's history.

== Demographics ==
Chart representing racial composition of the student body at Ligon

After the racial integration period, Ligon heavily promoted diversity, which is still part of its goal. As of 2007, there were 157 Asian students (~15%), 376 African-American students (~36%), 496 White students (~47%), and 17 Hispanic students (~1%). In addition, students' differences in income and class are shown by the 24% of the school which gets reduced price or free lunches.

A large number of its NC state-identified academically gifted students go on to Enloe High School.

=== Admissions ===
In the 2008–09 school year, only 34% of applicants received admission.

== Curriculum ==
=== Electives ===
Ligon has many extracurricular courses and electives. These include foreign languages, which include Spanish, German, French, Japanese, Chinese, and American Sign Language. Ligon also offers courses in physical education. These would include, Archery, Tennis 1, Tennis 2, Basketball 1, Basketball 2, Basketball 3, Racket Sports, Sports Variety, Golf, Soccer 1, Soccer 2, and Fencing. Ligon also has electives that can be as specific as Flash software and Visual Basic programming. Many electives involve students in running the school, such as technical theater, yearbook, and LTV (Ligon Television).

=== Performing arts ===
Ligon offers multiple courses in piano, orchestra, band, dance, chorus, and acting.

Two of Ligon's string orchestras, Silver Strings and Ligon Philharmonic, performed in Carnegie Hall, New York City, NY.

== Extracurricular activities ==
=== Sports ===
Ligon's colors are blue and gold, and their teams are referred to as the Little Blues.

Ligon's sports teams include:

- Volleyball
- Softball
- Football
- Men's and Women's Soccer
- Men's and Women's Basketball
- Track and Field
- Cheerleading

== Notable alumni ==
Name	Class year	Notability	Reference(s)
John Baker	1954	Former NFL football player, sheriff of Wake County from 1978–2002, first black sheriff in North Carolina since Reconstruction era	
Chuck Davis	1954	Dancer, founder of DanceAfrica and the African American Dance Ensemble	
Ralph Campbell, Jr.	1964	15th Auditor of North Carolina, first African American to hold statewide elected executive office in North Carolina	
Mel Tomlinson	1971	ballet dancer with the New York City Ballet, Alvin Ailey American Dance Theater, Agnes de Mille Dance Theatre, North Carolina Dance Theatre, and Boston Ballet	
Tristian Brown	2005	Rapper, member of Troop 41	
Lelynd Darkes	2005	Rapper, member of Troop 41	
Dakare Wilder	2005	Rapper, member of Troop 41	

== Notable faculty ==
- Beth Cochran, former principal
