= Year-round school in the United States =

Year-round school is the practice of having students attend school without the traditional summer vacation, which is believed to have been made necessary by agricultural practices in the past. The agrarian school calendar consisted of a short winter and a short summer could help with planting in the spring and harvest in the fall. In cities, schools were open most of the year; for example, in 1842, New York City schools were open 248 days a year, although school attendance was not yet mandatory. Now, as of 2024, there are usually 180 days per total school year. Summers were very hot before air conditioning was invented, so upper class and eventually middle-class families would flee the cities and take their children to the countryside, so schools in cities eventually started taking summers off. In the late 19th century, a push was made for the standardization of urban and rural school calendars, and the modern system was created. 10 percent of US public schools are currently using a year-round calendar. A research spotlight on year-round education discusses the year-round calendar. The basic year-round calendar generates through a 45-15 ratio. This refers to students staying in school for 45 days but then getting 15 days of break. Students do not receive the traditional summer vacation, but instead they have more frequent breaks through the entire year.

Switching to year-round schooling has some positive effects, such as allowing the opportunity for teachers to have a year-round job and more time to plan lessons and class activities while not taking as long to reteach information that students are unable to retain over their summer break, along with giving students more frequent breaks throughout the year. Some families are in favor of the year-round calendar because they are allowed to take vacations at different times of the year rather than specific timeframes. This also allows families to spend more time together.

Another purpose of year-round schooling is to decrease overcrowding. Some schools operate on three different cycles of school which would have three groups going to school at different times. This would allow for a larger number of students to attend the same school while not having large class sizes. When this happens, it also allows for the school to be in constant use, rather than being unoccupied during breaks and summer.

A 2016 review summarized research on year-round schools as follows:

"Although year-round calendars do increase summer learning, they reduce learning at other times of year, so that the total amount learned over a 12-month period is no greater under a year-round calendar than under a nine-month calendar."

— Paul von Hippel, The Summer Slide (2016)

Year-round calendars can offer a way to reduce school crowding. A crowded school can adopt a multi-track year-round calendar, which staggers students so that different groups of students attend on different calendars, or "tracks", with some students attending while others are on break. In this way, the school can handle more students than it could if all students needed to be in school at the same time. Multi-track year-round calendars have been used to reduce crowding in California, greater Las Vegas, and greater Raleigh, North Carolina, among other places.

Compared to other ways to handle crowding—such as busing or portable classrooms—multi-track year-round calendars can be relatively inexpensive. However, if schools are open for longer, the operating and maintenance costs may increase by up to 10 percent.

However, businesses that rely on summer leisure time are not in favor of year-round calendars. Summer camps and amusement parks often lead political opposition to year-round calendars, but some opposition is led by upper middle-class parents who value summer vacations. Rural areas rarely use year-round calendars because they conflict with farms' need for youth labor in summer.
