= Enloe High School =

American public, magnet school in North Carolina

William G. Enloe High School

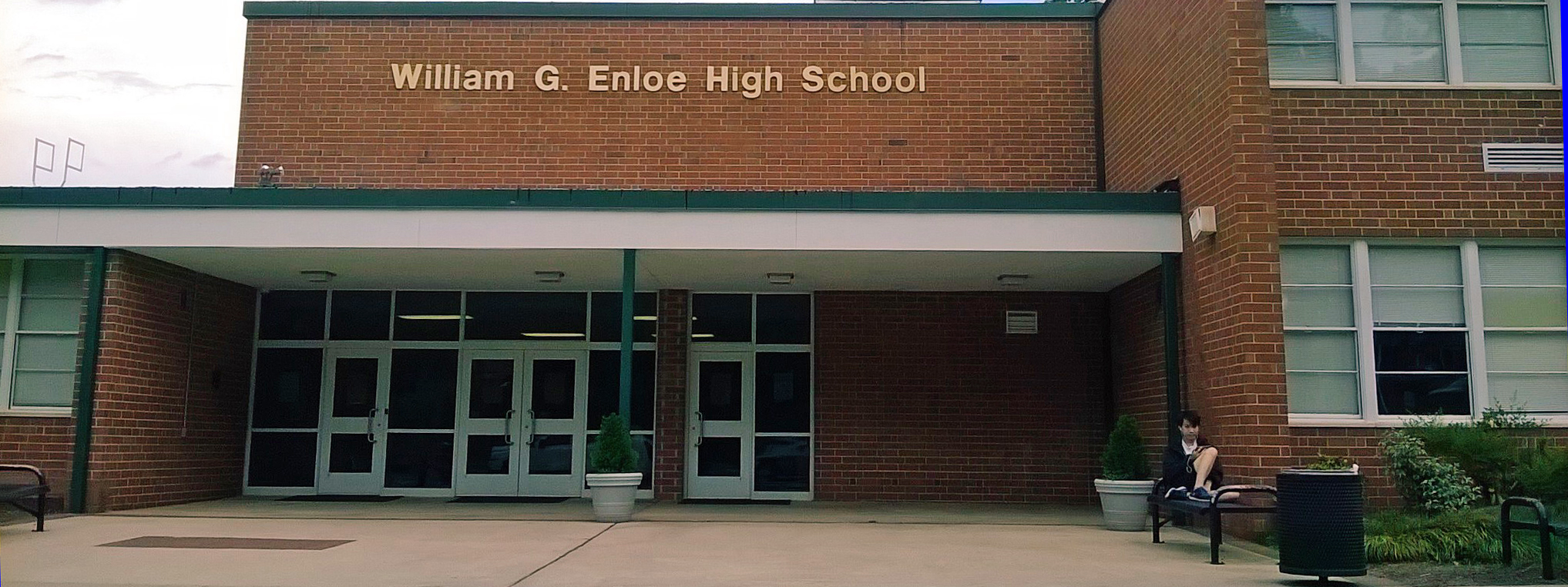
- Front entrance of Enloe's West Campus

Location
- 128 Clarendon Crescent; Raleigh, North Carolina 27610; United States; 35°47′02″N 78°36′10″W

Information
- School type: Public (Magnet, IB, GT)
- Founded: 1962 (64 years ago)
- CEEB code: 343210
- Principal: Eric Rosen
- Staff: 154 (FTE)
- Enrollment: 2,604 (2024-2025)
- Student to teacher ratio: 16.91
- Education system: Wake County Public School System
- Colors: Forest green and old gold
- Athletics: NCHSAA 8A
- Athletics conference: CAP 8A
- Mascot: Eagle
- Rival: Southeast Raleigh High School
- Newspaper: The Eagle's Eye
- Yearbook: Quotannis
- Website: Enloe Magnet High School

William G. Enloe GT/IB Magnet Center for the Humanities, Sciences and the Arts, also known as Enloe Magnet High School or Enloe High School, is a public magnet high school offering Gifted & Talented and International Baccalaureate programs located in eastern Raleigh, North Carolina, United States. It is operated under the Wake County Public School System. The first integrated public high school in the city of Raleigh, it was named after William Gilmore Enloe, the Mayor of Raleigh at the time the school was opened.

== History ==
William G. Enloe High School was originally organized as two different schools that shared athletic facilities between adjacent campuses—William G. Enloe Senior High School, named after Raleigh Mayor William G. Enloe, and Charles B. Aycock Junior High School, named after North Carolina Governor Charles Brantley Aycock. The original Enloe campus was opened in 1962 as the first integrated secondary school in Raleigh for the education of students participating in grades seven through twelve and served as the secondary educational institution for the Longview Gardens community. Enloe's mixed population was drawn from the white student body at Needham B. Broughton High School and the black one at John W. Ligon High School. It was deemed undesirable to pull Broughton's upcoming seniors out, so Enloe had only 160 juniors for its highest class out of a student body of 910 during its first year. George A. Kahdy was the school's first principal. He held the post for five years.

Three years after Enloe opened, Aycock was created on an adjacent campus as a junior high school to educate students in the seventh through ninth grades, taking the place of recently shuttered Hugh Morson Junior High. Enloe became a senior high school with concentrated education for grades ten through twelve. In 1973, Enloe became the first fully integrated high school in Raleigh and the first fully integrated high school to hire a black principal. Enloe absorbed the Aycock campus in 1979, becoming a modern high school focused on educating ninth through twelfth grade students. The Aycock building became the East Building, while the original Enloe complex became the West Building.

In 1980, Enloe began providing magnet courses for "gifted and talented" students in Wake County. Around 300 students participated in the first two years of the program's existence. The school was promoted to full magnet status in 1982. Until the mid-1990s, Enloe was the only magnet high school in the Wake County Public School System, leading to a high concentration of academically talented students. The 1993 graduating class included 42 National Merit Semifinalists, a number that remains a state record.

In July 1997, Enloe became an IB World School, allowing students to pursue the challenging International Baccalaureate Programme. Enloe IB students are occasionally invited to attend special events or trips through their involvement in the IB Programme. Enloe IB students participated in exchanges with high schools in China (2004–2005) and Germany, and started a relationship with students at a high school in Turkey through the use of video conferencing technology (2005–2006).

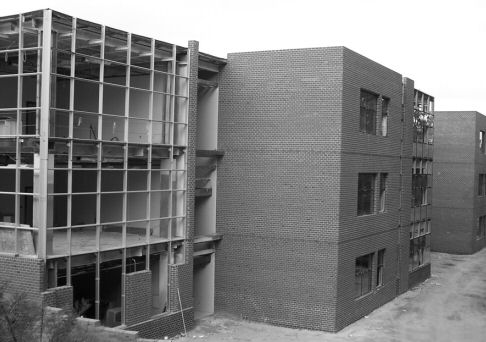
The Towers under construction in 2006

In 2006, Enloe finished the construction of a new addition to West Campus building and consequently closed the 50-year-old, outdated East Campus for renovation. The new section of the West Building was named the Towers. Almost all of the classes migrated from the East Campus to the new building, reducing the need to share classes with its larger capacity. The East Campus was reopened on January 22, 2008, at the start of the second semester. It included autotech classes, the new East Gym, student services, healthful living classrooms, and other classrooms. The next stage of Enloe's renovation was completed in January 2009, and involved the locker rooms in the West Gym being converted to house the audio-visual classrooms as well as the television studio.

The Wake County School Board considered removing the International Baccalaureate and magnet status from Enloe in 2008, but this decision was overturned due to the intense lobbying of students and their parents.

On June 29, 2010, historian Timothy Tyson and North Carolina NAACP President William Barber II spoke before the Wake County Public School System Board about racial segregation, arguing that Mayor William G. Enloe had been in favor of it. As result, the school board announced it would review its school naming policy. Many students and alumni from Enloe High School feared the name of the school would be altered, and quickly organized to protest any potential moves to do so. Wake County Commissioner Stan Norwalk accused the school board of attempting to retaliate against Enloe students for opposing its decision to eliminate the county's diversity policy. NAACP officials later clarified that the mentioning of Enloe was intended to bring in historical context, and that they did not desire for the school's name to be changed. In the face of growing criticism, board member John Todesco stated that the board would not remove Enloe's name from the school unless something "horrid" about him was uncovered.

As of 2016, Enloe had 35 AP courses and 24 IB courses.

In between March 14 and 15, 2019, the school was vandalized with racist and homophobic graffiti. Some of the messages were targeted at the school's principal, William Chavis. The damage was discovered on the morning of March 15, and school officials had the messages covered.

=== Evangelist controversy ===
In February 2007, the school came under fire from Muslim advocacy groups and the American Civil Liberties Union after history teacher Robert Escamilla invited Kamil Solomon, a Coptic Christian Evangelist and head of Kamil International Ministries, to speak about his experiences with Christianity and Muslims. The Council on American Islamic Relations and parents of Muslim and secular students accused the school of breaching federal civil rights laws and promoting hate in a public school. Escamilla was suspended with pay for 90 days while the school district investigated the complaint. He was later transferred to an alternative school and reprimanded by Superintendent Del Burns. In addition, Burns apologized to Muslims for Solomon's visit. He subsequently issued new guidelines that require guest speakers to sign forms saying they will not denigrate any culture, race, gender, national origin or religion. Escamilla appealed the punishment, but the grievance was rejected by the school board. In a controversial move, the school board voted to release part of Escamilla's confidential personnel file to justify its decision. Escamilla filed a lawsuit asking to be transferred back to Enloe. Escamilla and the school district reached a settlement in which Wake agreed not to punish him any further over the Evangelist controversy.

=== Charity ball ===
In 2004, Enloe High School began hosting a "Charity Ball" and raising money in connection with the dance for local philanthropic causes. By 2019 the school had raised over $1 million for charitable causes.

== Demographics ==
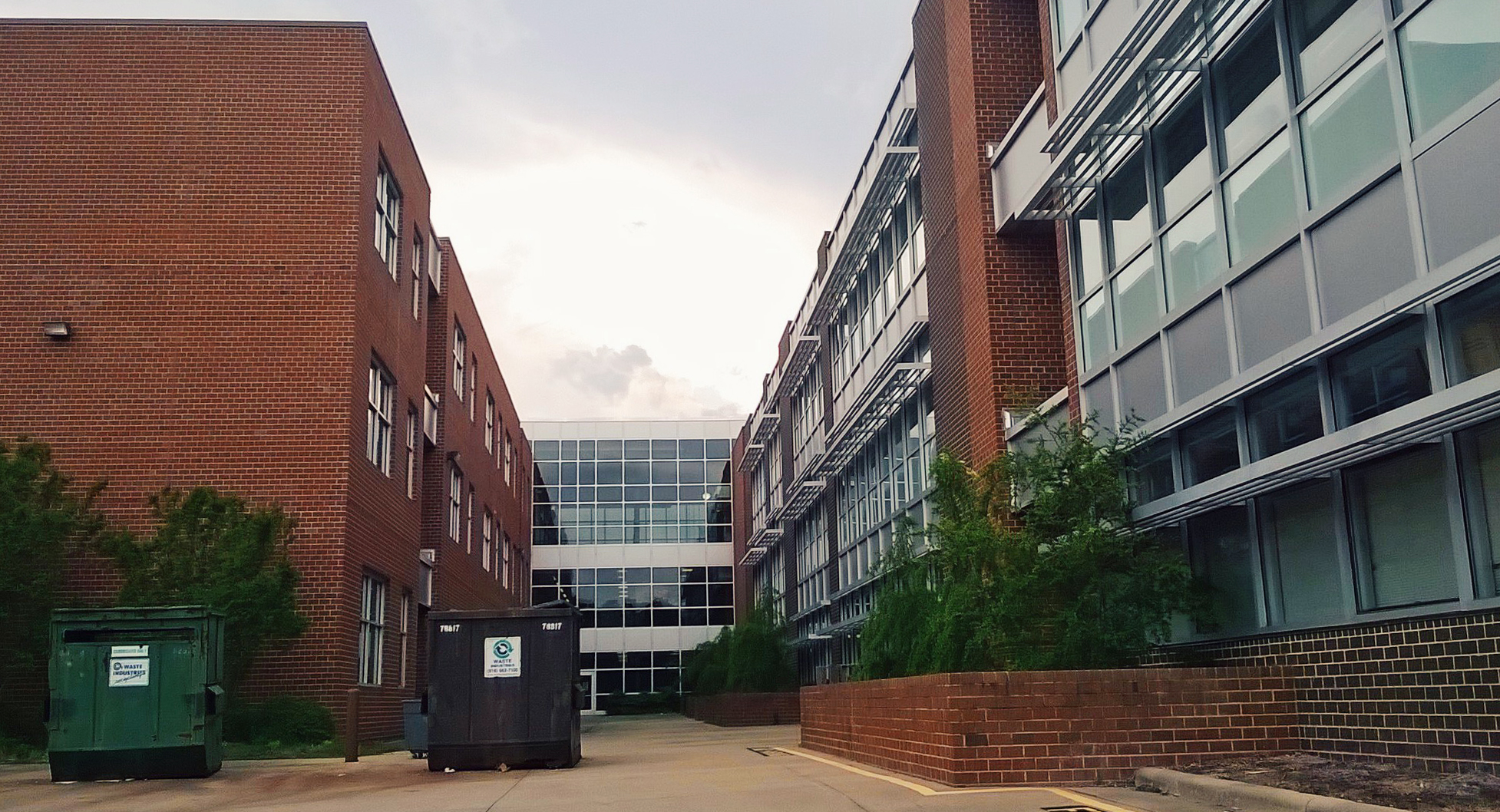
Enloe's West Building Towers in 2016

=== Student body ===
In the 2008–2009 school year, Enloe had approximately 2,640 enrolled students. Of this population, 12% were of Asian descent. The remainder of Enloe's student population were composed of students with ancestries of White (42%), African (35%), and Hispanic (9%) descent.

At the beginning of the 2015–2016 school year, a cap was placed on Enloe's enrollment at 2,650 to prevent overcrowding. As of 2016, Enloe had 2,610 enrolled students. Of those, 38% were African American/Black, 29% were Caucasian/White, 18% were Asian/Pacific Islander, 12% were Hispanic/Latino, 4% were multi-ethnic, and less than 1% were Native American. This cap was removed prior to the 2019–2020 school year.

==== Graduation rate ====
Enloe's graduation rate is above the county average. In the 2018–19 school year, 93.7% of Enloe students graduated in four years, compared to 89.9% of all Wake County high school students, according to the N.C. Department of Public Instruction.

==== Poverty ====
During the 2013–2014 school year, 32% of Enloe's students were eligible for free lunch and another 4% qualified for reduced-price lunch. As of November 2015, Enloe worked with about 75 families designated homeless as per the McKinney–Vento Homeless Assistance Act. Principal Scott Lyons petitioned Wake County Public School System for the transfer of an additional social worker from a less disadvantaged school to help address the problem.

=== Faculty and staff ===
There were 148 members of the Enloe teaching staff in 2006, and many support personnel were employed in administration, guidance and similar positions. Twenty-five members were certified by the National Board for Professional Teaching Standards and 39% possessed an advanced degree (Masters or PhD) in their respective fields.

During the 2015–2016 school year, Enloe employed 210 staff members, of whom 157 were classroom teachers. Twenty-four were certified by the National Board for Professional Teaching Standards, 78 had an advanced degree, and 19 had over 25 years of teaching experience.

== Science and technology ==
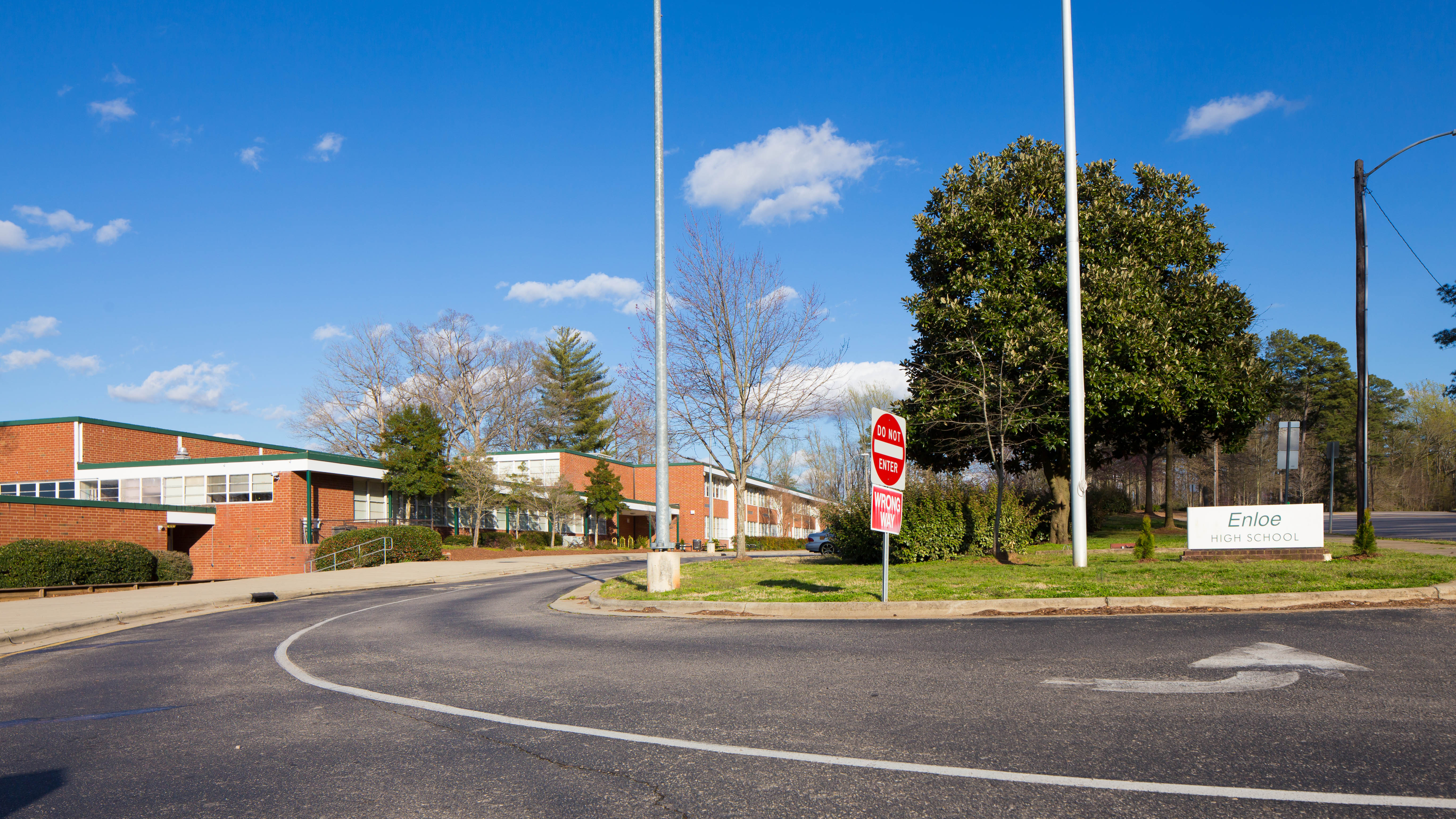
Front of West Campus

From 1994 to 1995, Enloe teachers were trained in the use of computers and technology. Instruction occurred in two phases. The first phase involved basic computer skills, word processing, data management, email, and multimedia (including handling of laserdisc players, Quicktake cameras, and camcorders), while the second focused on educating teachers on technology that could be specifically applied to their curriculum.

In 2008, a team from Enloe won the Team America Rocketry Challenge.

== Arts, humanities, and social sciences ==
As of 1997, Enloe had the largest arts facilities of any school in Wake County. The school was one of only three high schools in the United States to host a production of the play Miss Saigon in the Spring of 2015.

The school offers courses in Spanish, French, German, Latin, Japanese, Chinese, and Italian.

As of 2011, Enloe was the only school in the state to offer a Russian language course.

Enloe is a host to several clubs within the field of Social Sciences; including Model United Nations, Speech and Debate, and Mock Trial. The school is also known for offering AP/IB courses within the social sciences field, such as AP Comparative Government and Politics, IB Global Politics, AP Psychology, and IB Philosophy.

== Media and publications ==
=== Newspaper ===
The student newspaper, The Eagle's Eye, has been in circulation since the 1960s. The first attempt to publish the paper failed. In 1966, the paper briefly lost the financial support of the student body. In response, the staff stopped distributing the publication freely and renamed it Enloe News. By 1968, the change had been reverted. In 1998 senior Matt Williams, an editor on the paper, sold ad space to the North Carolina Lambda Youth Network, a self-described leadership development group for lesbian, gay, bisexual and straight young people. Principal Lloyd Gardner objected to the wording and potential political message that the ad could convey. Students argued that they should publish it on the basis of being allowed to run a Christian group's ad in a previous edition. Gardner responded by banning the Christian ad from being run a second time. Williams appealed both decisions to the Wake County Public School System's board. The censorship was unanimously upheld by a three-member panel, which asserted that the county policy allowed the principal to make final decisions regarding school publications.The Eagle's Eye switched from print publishing to publishing its articles online through the newspaper's site, enloenews.org.

==== Unofficial publications ====
In the fall of 1992, students founded an independent newspaper, Vanguard. Taking in submissions from students, it was seen as an alternative to The Eagle's Eye, which some students thought did not fully address controversial topics of the time. Principal Bobby Allen found a series of jokes in one article offensive and asserted that he could review each monthly issue before its release, as per county policy. He also maintained that if the content were inappropriate it could not be distributed on campus. A student argued that the review process would interfere with the paper's printing schedule and infringe upon students' first amendment rights, and appealed to the American Civil Liberties Union (ACLU) for assistance. In May 1994, the ACLU filed a lawsuit against the public school system on behalf of the paper's editors. After months of negotiation, the school board reached a settlement whereby students could publish free from prior review as long they did not distribute during class. In 1995, two other independent newspapers, Glass Butterfly and Spare Ribs, were published at the school. Vanguard ceased publication several years later.

=== Magazine ===
Enloe's original student literary magazine, Image, was first published in 1964 and was issued at least through 1968. A succeeding publication, Stone Soup, has been in circulation since the 1980s.

=== Television ===
Enloe also has its own control room and broadcast desk where students produce the school's live television news show, the 'Loe Down. It has won numerous National Academy Television Student Awards for the Nashville Midsouth Chapter.

Through its video and audio production classes, Enloe High School has also gained multiple Student Emmys. This includes two awards and six nominations since 2012.

== Athletics ==
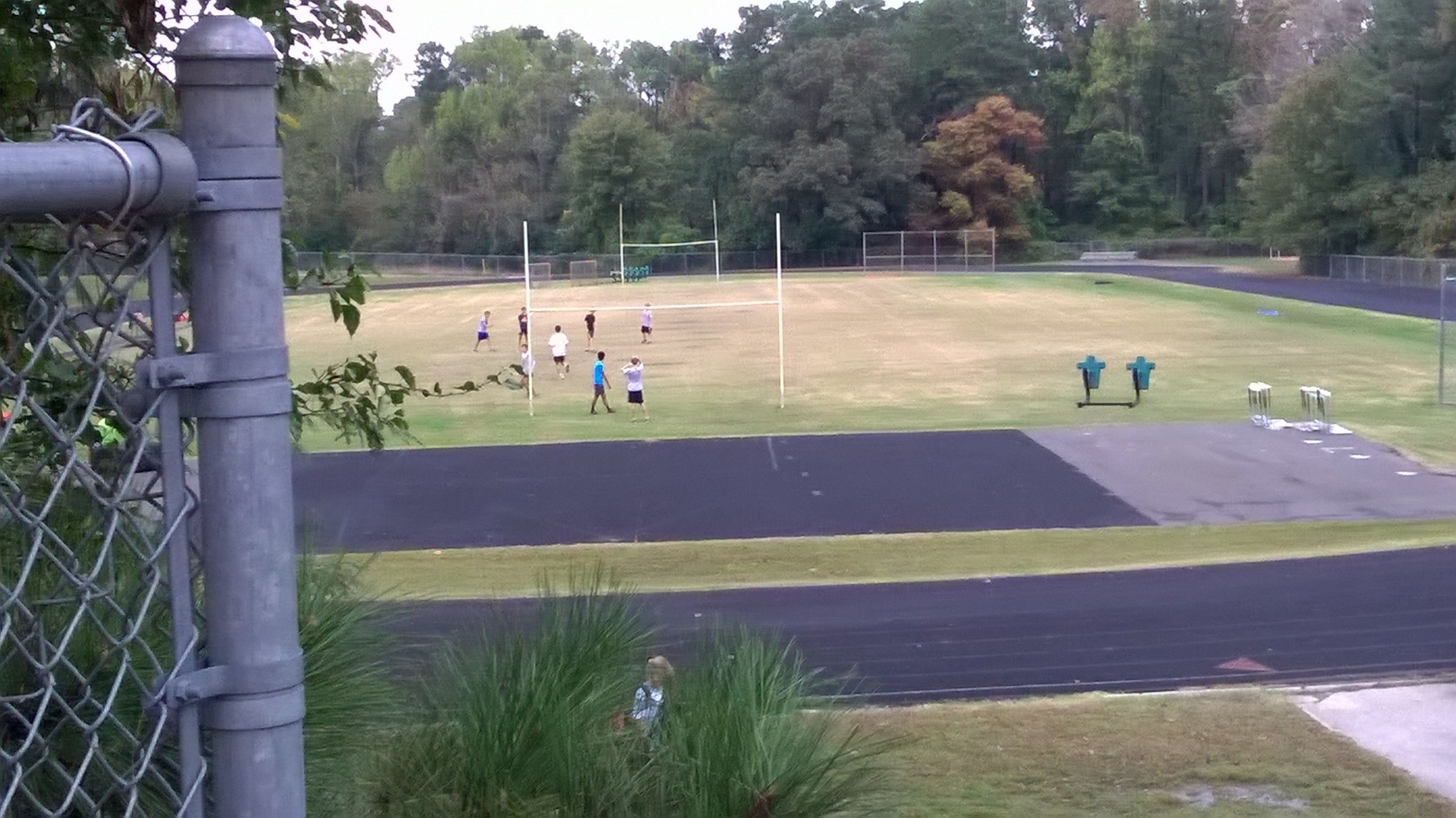
Enloe's track and practice field as seen from the East campus

Enloe's sports image was designed by the Broughton sophomores allotted to attend the school their junior year in 1962. During a meeting in Broughton's gymnasium, it was decided that the mascot would be an eagle, the colors would be the same as the Green Bay Packers', the football helmets would be all gold in the style of the University of Notre Dame's Fighting Irish, and the fight song would be University of Michigan's The Victors.

Enloe is a member of the North Carolina High School Athletic Association (NCHSAA) and are classified as an 8A school. The school is a part of the CAP 8A Conference.

Enloe's current sports teams are as follows:

- Football
- Cheerleading
- Men's and women's basketball
- Men's and women's lacrosse
- Baseball
- Softball
- Men's and women's tennis
- Men's and women's golf
- Gymnastics
- Men's and women's swimming & diving
- Men's and women's track & field
- Men's and women's cross country
- Men's and women's soccer
- Volleyball
- Wrestling

The men's swimming & diving team won nine consecutive state championships from 1999 to 2007 and had additional wins in conference and regional championships.

Enloe's historical rival in athletics is Broughton High School.

== Rankings and awards ==
Enloe was recognized in 2014 as a School of Distinction by Magnet Schools of America.

For the 2014–2015 school year, Enloe's graduating class received over $15.4 million in scholarships, the highest of any high school in the Wake County Public School System.

As of 2021, the U.S. News & World Report ranks Enloe was ranked 2138th in the nation, 60th in North Carolina, and 207th in the nation for magnet schools.

In 2016, according to The Washington Post, Enloe ranked seventh in the state and 280th nationally for most challenging high schools.

== Notable alumni ==
Name	Class year	Notability	Reference(s)
Randy Denton	1967	Former basketball player for Duke, the ABA, and the NBA	
Charley Young	1969	Former running back for the Dallas Cowboys	
Willie Burden	1970	Former football player for NCSU and the CFL Calgary Stampeders; member of the Canadian Football Hall of Fame	
Yvonne Lewis Holley	1970	Member of the North Carolina House of Representatives and Democratic candidate for Lieutenant Governor of North Carolina in 2020	
Randy Jones	1970	Singer, original cowboy from the musical group Village People	
Bill Campbell		Politician, Mayor of Atlanta	
Wayne Burden	1974	Former basketball player for Chico State and the Hobart Devils	
Danny Young	1980	Former basketball player at Wake Forest and spent 10 years in the NBA	
Nate McMillan	1982	Head coach of the Atlanta Hawks former head coach of Indiana Pacers, Seattle SuperSonics & Portland Trail Blazers; former player for Chowan College, NCSU, and the Seattle SuperSonics	
Gregory Washington	1985	8th President of George Mason University, former dean of the Henry Samueli School of Engineering at University of California, Irvine	
Chris Heagarty	1987	Member of the North Carolina House of Representatives and lobbyist	
Mary Robinette Kowal	1987	Hugo Award winning author and puppeteer	
LeVelle Moton	1992	Head men's basketball coach at NC Central University, former All-American shooting guard at NC Central, former professional basketball player in Europe and Asia	
Travis Cherry	1993	Grammy Nominated Music Producer	
Justin Lee	1996	Author, founder of the Gay Christian Network	
Anand Lal Shimpi	2000	Founder and CEO of AnandTech	
Chris Wilcox	2000	Former basketball player for University of Maryland, College Park, Los Angeles Clippers, Seattle SuperSonics, Oklahoma City Thunder, New York Knicks, Detroit Pistons, and Boston Celtics	
P. J. Tucker	2003	Former basketball player at University of Texas, Austin; 2008 Israeli Basketball Premier League MVP, currently playing for the Philadelphia 76ers	
Michael Quattlebaum	2004	Rapper and performance artist known as Mykki Blanco	
Charlie Houchin	2006	U.S. 2012 gold-medalist Olympic swimmer	
Haseeb Fatmi	2006	Politician and Attorney	
Anne-Claire Niver	2008	Singer-songwriter	
Isadora Cerullo	2009	2016 Olympic Brazilian rugby player, 2015 Pan American bronze medalist	
Lea Ved	2009	Dancer and choreographer. Company member at Nederlands Dans Theater and former second soloist with the Royal Swedish Ballet	
Moses Wright	2017	Basketball player for the Georgia Tech Yellow Jackets, 2021 ACC Player of the Year	
George Marks	2018	Soccer player for Charlotte FC, 2021 Most Outstanding Defensive Player of NCAA Tournament	
Laith Marjan	2021	NFL placekicker for the Pittsburgh Steelers	

== Notable faculty ==
- Beth Cochran, former principal
