= Washington Magnet Elementary School =

Historic school building in North Carolina, United States

- Washington Graded and High School
- U.S. National Register of Historic Places
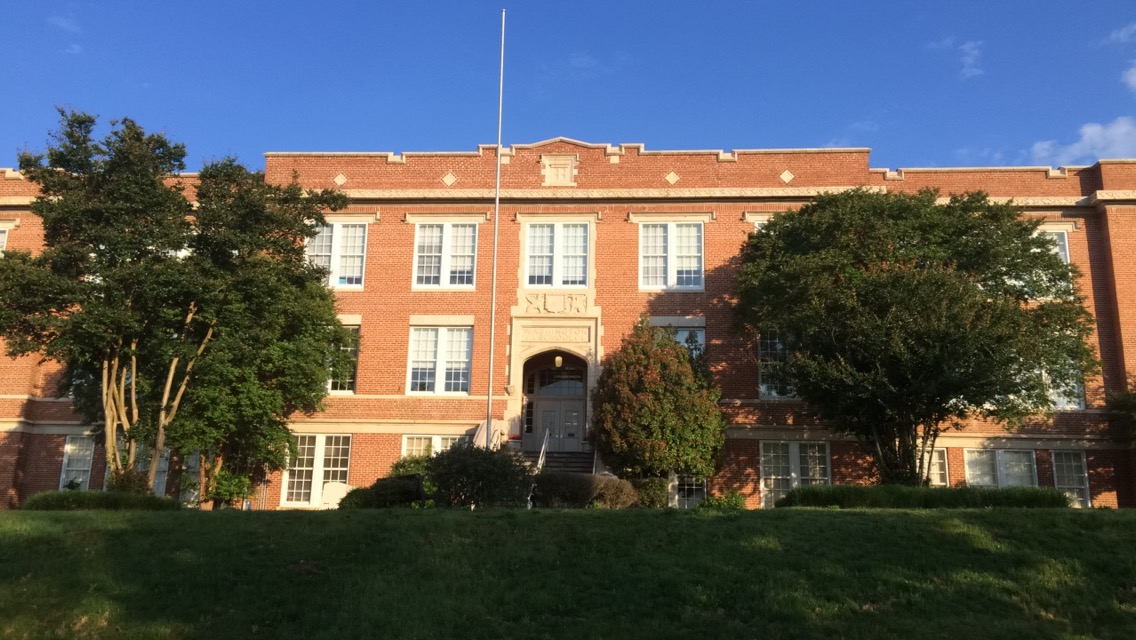
- Front entrance to the school

- Location within North Carolina Location within the United States
- Location: 1000 Fayetteville St., Raleigh, North Carolina
- Coordinates: 35.7675°N 78.6429°W
- Area: 16.5 acres (6.7 ha)
- Built: 1923–1924
- Architect: Christopher Gadson Sayre, W.B. Barrow and Son, et al.
- Architectural style: Tudor Revival
- NRHP reference No.: 04001584
- Added to NRHP: February 2, 2005

Washington Magnet Elementary School is a historic school and building located at Raleigh, Wake County, North Carolina. It was built in 1923–1924 to serve African-American students in Raleigh and is now a magnet elementary school.

== History ==
From 1924 until 1953, Washington served as the only secondary education institution for black students in Raleigh. This changed with the establishment of John W. Ligon Junior-Senior High School, which assumed that role.

In 1982, Washington became an elementary school involved with the magnet program and Gifted & Talented curriculum.

Washington was listed on the National Register of Historic Places in 2001 as the Washington Graded and High School. In 2003, it received designation as a Local Historic Site by the City of Raleigh's Historic Preservation Association.

=== Building ===
Washington Graded and High School was originally constructed in 1923-1924 as part of the city of Raleigh's plans to expand the education system in order to accommodate increasing numbers of school-aged children. The project was funded by a portion of the money from a million dollar bond issued by the school board on April 4, 1922. At the time of its completion in 1924, The original building is a two-story brick building with Tudor Revival-style design elements. A three-story rear addition was built in 1927, a track in 1942, a gymnasium in 1949, and other additions were made in 1996 and 2000. The building was renovated from 2002-2003.

== Notable alumni ==
- John H. Baker Jr., former NFL defensive lineman and long-time Wake County sheriff
- Maycie Herrington, history conservator
- June Kay Campbell, civil rights activist
- Pee Wee Moore, jazz saxophonist
- Millie Dunn Veasey, civil rights activist and United States Army veteran

== Notable faculty ==
- John W. Ligon, interim principal which John W. Ligon Middle School was named after
