= Wake County Public School System =

School district in North Carolina, United States

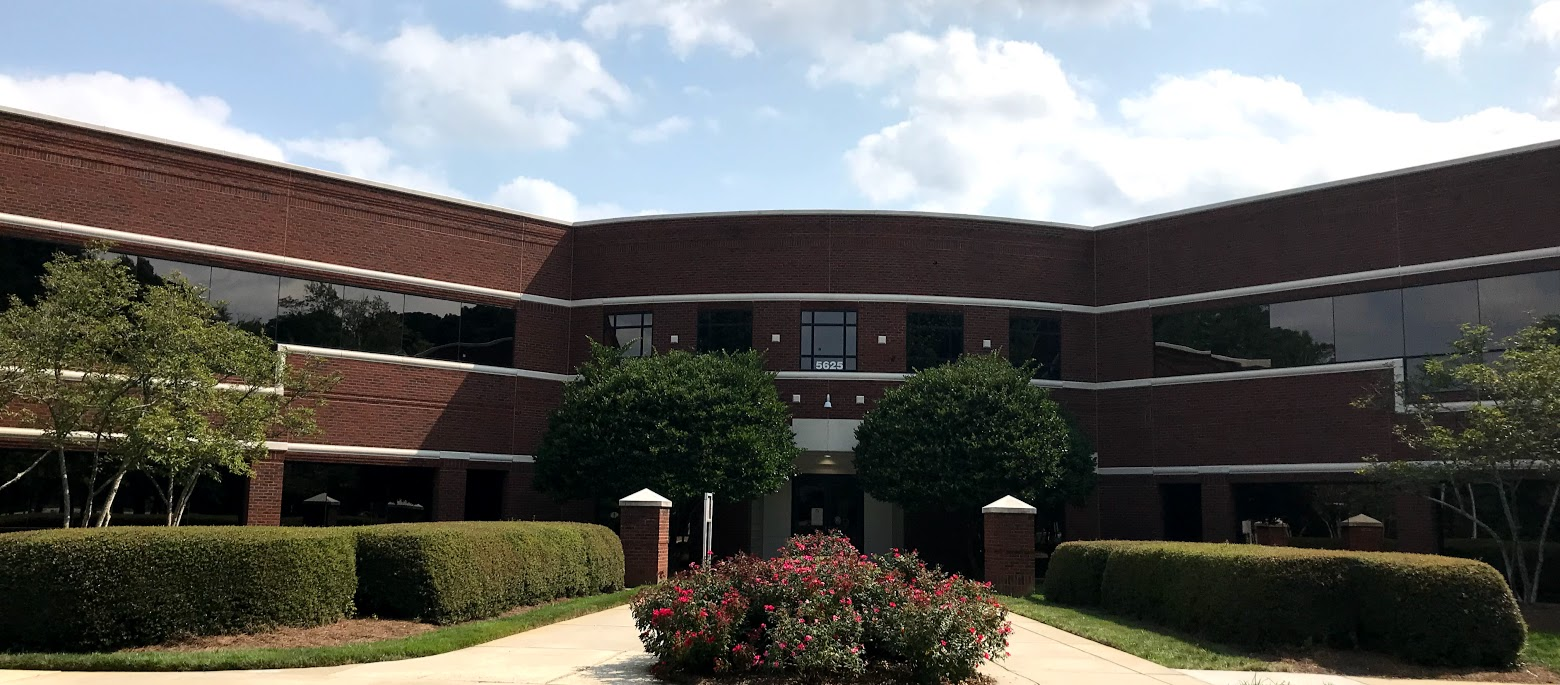
- The main office of Wake County Public School System

Address
- 5625 Dillard Drive Cary, North Carolina, 27518; United States
- Coordinates: 35°45′14.51″N 78°44′13.67″W

District information
- Established: 1976; 50 years ago
- Superintendent: Dr. Robert P. Taylor
- Budget: $2.2 billion (2023-24)
- NCES District ID: 3704720

Students and staff
- Enrollment: 159,778
- Staff: 10,663 (on an FTE basis)

Other information
- Website: www.wcpss.net

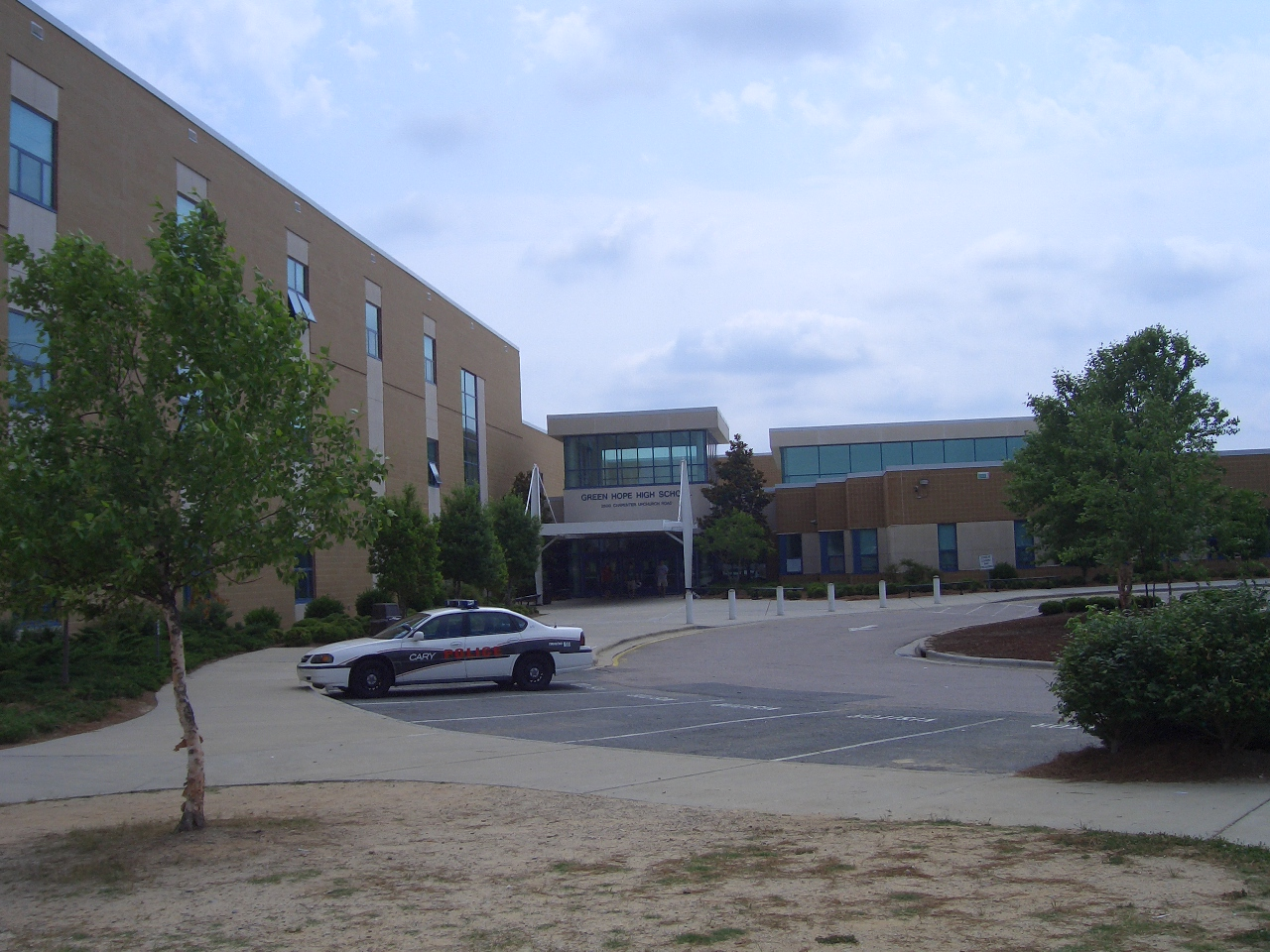
Green Hope High School

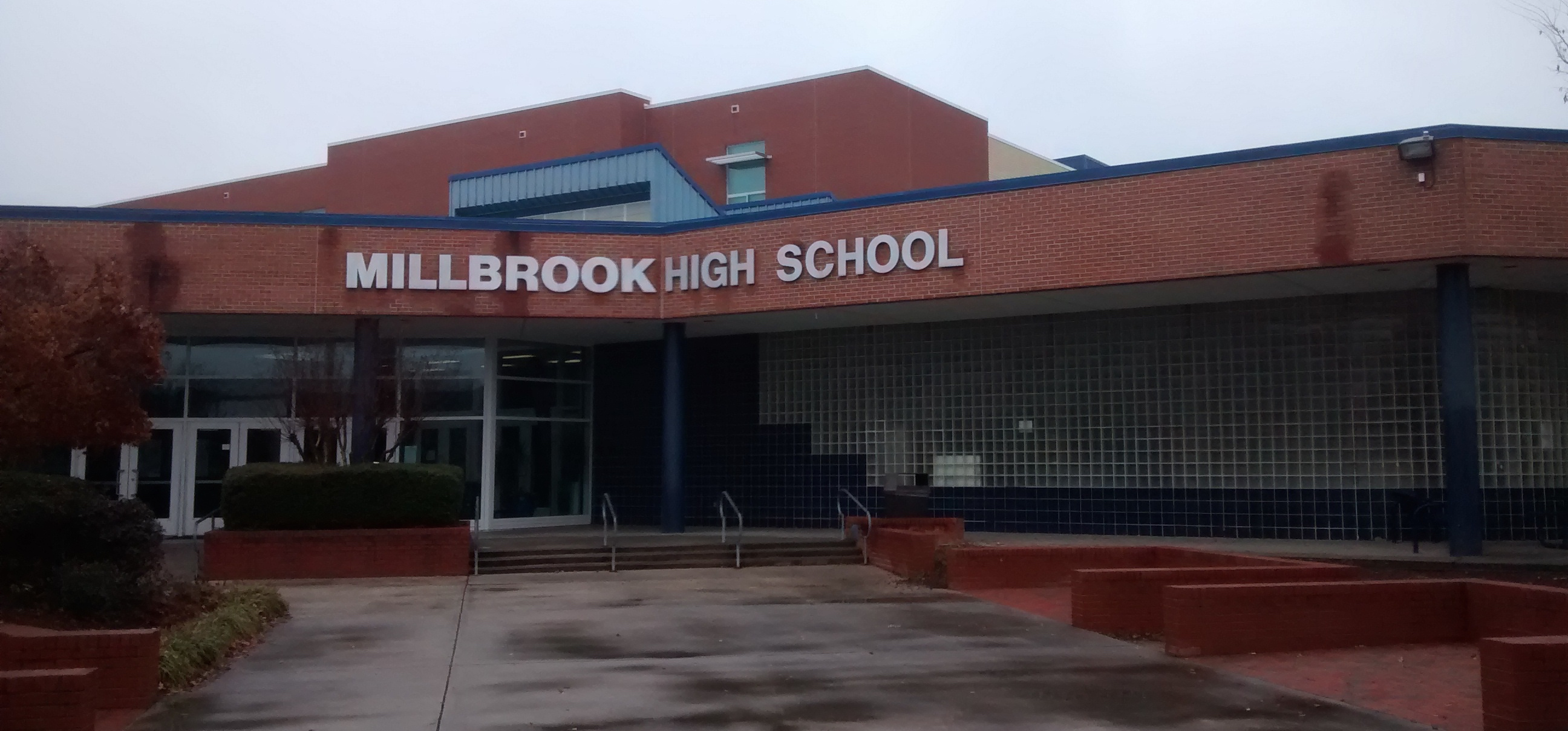
Millbrook High School

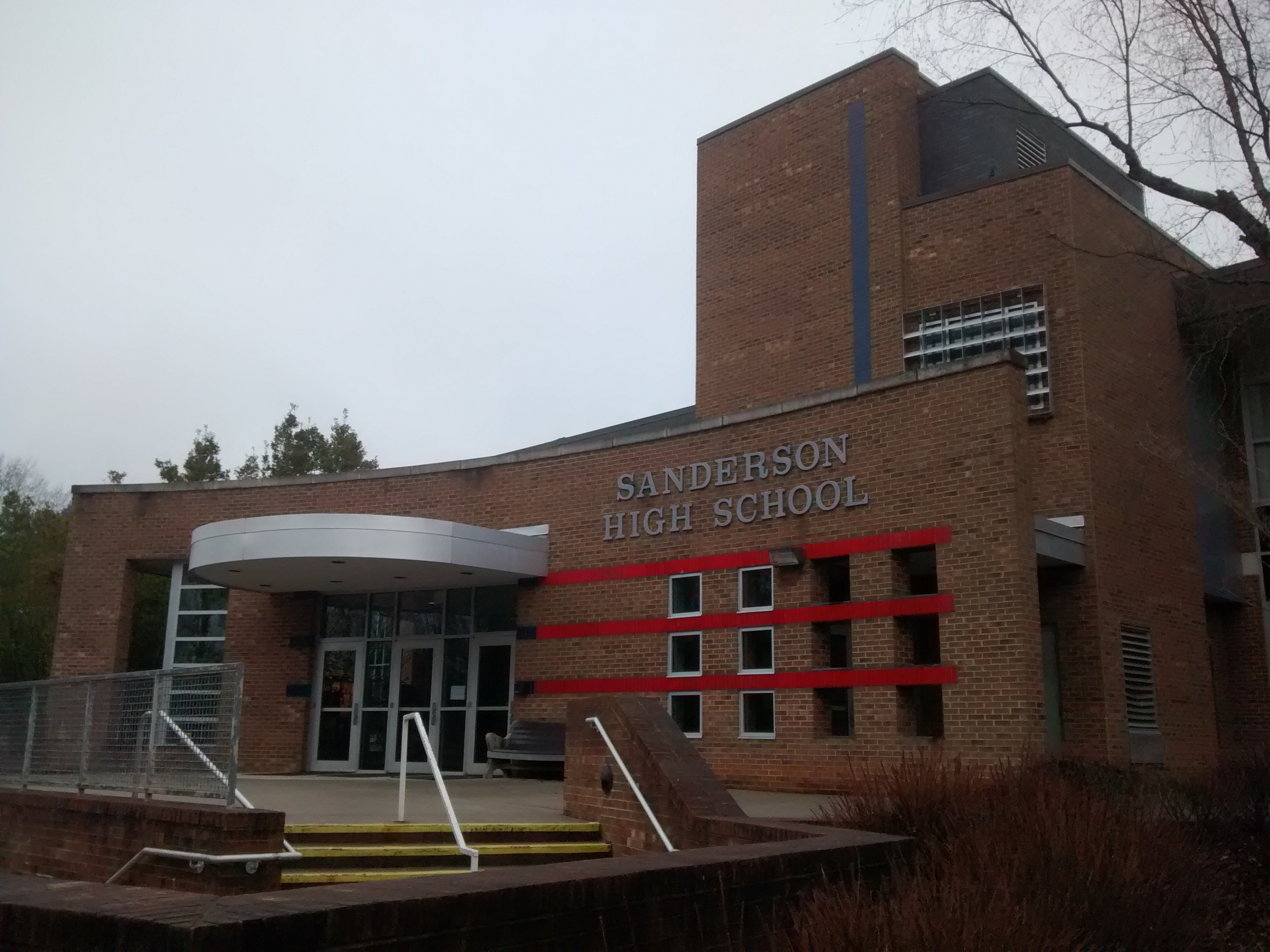
Jesse O. Sanderson High School

The Wake County Public School System (WCPSS) is a public school district located in Wake County, North Carolina. With 159,995 students in average daily membership and 198 schools as of the 2023–24 school year, it is the largest public school district in North Carolina and 14th-largest in the United States as of 2016.

All of Wake County is in this school district.

To see the list of schools and their statistics, see List of schools in the Wake County Public School System.

== History ==
The current school system is the result of a 1976 merger between the previous (historically largely white) Wake County school system and the former (historically largely minority) Raleigh City schools. The merger was proposed initially by business leaders in the early 1970s out of concerns that continued "white flight" from Raleigh's inner-city schools would negatively impact the county's overall economy. Political and educational leaders also hoped that merging the two systems would ease court-mandated desegregation. The proposal proved initially unpopular with residents, however, who rejected it by a 3–1 margin in a nonbinding referendum in 1973. School and business leaders instead convinced the North Carolina General Assembly to force the merger.

The district since has become notable for its integration efforts. Schools in the system are integrated based on the income levels reported by families on applications for federally subsidized school lunches, with the goal of having a maximum ratio of 40% low-income students at any one school. Consequently, thousands of suburban students are bused to magnet schools in poorer areas—and likewise, low-income students to suburban schools—to help maintain this income balance. Magnet schools are characterized as being public schools that specialize in a particular area, such as science or the arts, to encourage desegregation by drawing students from multiple neighbourhood and districts to the same school. Professor Gerald Grant of Syracuse University used Wake County as a metaphor of hope in his 2009 book Hope and Despair in the American City: Why There Are No Bad Schools in Raleigh. Grant says, "The research is very clear that having the right mix of kids socioeconomically, as Wake County does, has enormous benefits for poor kids without hurting rich kids." According to U.S. News & World Report, in 2005, 63.8% of low-income students in Wake County passed the state's end of high school exams, which was significantly higher than surrounding counties that do not have similar integration policies.

The county's residents are divided in their support for the system's integration program due, partially, to some of the means of achieving that integration, such as long bus rides for many students and a lack of neighborhood schools. Despite improved integration, test results among poorer students continue to lag; for the 2007–2008 school year, only 18% of the district's schools met the adequate yearly progress goals of the No Child Left Behind Act, with only 71 percent passing state standardised tests. Due to the recent U.S. Supreme Court ruling restricting the use of race in assigning students, Wake has been cited as a model for how other school systems can still maintain diversity in enrollment.

In the effort to maintain economic diversity and keep up with rapid growth in its student population, Wake routinely reassigns thousands of students each year to different schools. Many parents object to this annual shuffle. For the 2008–09 school year, for example, the school district has stated that it will reassign some 6,464 students in order to affect a new system-wide policy designed to help schools in the same geographic area achieve similar economic demographics. This wave of changes will require the reassignment of many low-income students to schools that have greater proportion of higher-income students. In February 2009, the school board approved a plan that would move 24,654 students to different schools over the next three years). The newly elected board gained a 5:4 Republican majority and was successful in overturning the integration policy that had been operating in Wake County for years.

Currently, 198 public schools are in the system, consisting of 119 elementary (K-5), 38 middle (6–8), 31 high (9–12), and 10 special/optional schools. With numerous new schools opening each year, the school board names new schools for a geographic feature (such as Holly Ridge) or for road where they are located (such as Athens Drive and Leesville Road) or for the geographic area they serve (such as Holly Springs High, Apex High, and Garner High). The board, however, has recently tried to avoid naming schools after nearby subdivisions because such names may lead some residents to believe that the school is the "neighborhood" school. Unlike earlier times, schools are no longer named after people, which has proven to be controversial in the past. Schools named prior to the current naming policy, however, retain their existing nongeographic names.

== Year-round calendar ==
WCPSS implemented year-round education through its magnet-school program (application by choice) in 1992. The first four magnet schools were Morrisville Elementary (opened in 1991); Durant Road Elementary, and West Lake Elementary and Middle schools (opened in 1992.) By 1999, The Wake County School System saw 11,000 of its 93,000 (12%) students enrolled in one of the district's 10 year round schools. That year there were 3000 applications for 1000 available seats. The Wake County Public School System made headlines in 2006 and 2007 for converting 19 elementary schools and three middle schools to a mandatory year-round calendar. It put more than a third of the elementary schools on the year-round calendar starting in July 2007. The decision was unpopular with some families who argued that the calendar switch should've been voluntary. The switch to a year-round calendar in many schools has led to some unanticipated needs. For example, PTA chapters at some of the affected schools have considered the purchase of sun shades for playgrounds to provide shelter for students during North Carolina's hot and humid summers.

A group of parents sued to block the school system from converting the schools. In May 2007, Judge Howard Manning ruled that the school system may offer a year-round calendar, but that it must obtain informed consent from a student's parents before assigning the students to a year-round school. Around 9% of the affected students did not consent and were assigned to a traditional calendar school. As a result, many year-round schools have empty seats and many traditional-calendar schools remain overcrowded. In May 2008, the North Carolina Court of Appeals overturned the lower court decision, ruling that Wake does not need parental permission for students to attend year-round schools, but the State Supreme Court School agreed to hear the case and stayed the appellate decision until it makes a ruling. District leaders sought consent for the 2008–09 school year but did not plan to do so the following year (2009–10).

In October 2008, the school board voted to convert Baucom Elementary in Apex and Green Hope Elementary in Cary back to the traditional calendar, citing a less-than-expected increase in enrollment. Salem Elementary in Apex was also considered for conversion back to a traditional calendar, but that move was voted against by the board. Also at that same meeting, the board voted to convert Leesville Road Middle in North Raleigh to a year-round calendar.

In May 2009, the state Supreme Court ruled that parental consent is not needed to send students to year-round schools. As a result, the school board decided to no longer seek consent. But the election of new school board members in October 2009, who said they opposed mandatory year-round schools, caused the district to go back to asking parents for permission.

== Controversies ==
=== Diversity controversy ===
National controversy arose in 2010 over the 5–4 decision of the Wake County School Board in March to switch from the socioeconomic diversification policy it had followed for a decade to a system that focused on neighborhood schools. The prior plan, under which the public schools of the county were to "have no more than 40 percent of students eligible for free or reduced-price lunch" was set aside for concerns over long student bus rides, but immediately raised comments among the public and the NAACP that the outcome of the shift would be to "resegregate" schools. The decision led to protests spearheaded by the state NAACP chapter, with arrests in June and July, and to the resignation of the superintendent of Wake County schools. The NAACP lodged a civil rights complaint with the office of the United States Department of Education, which began an investigation into the matter. The complaint also prompted one national accreditation agency, AdvancED, to evaluate the schools to see if the decision would impact the school's accreditation standing.

In January 2011, The Washington Post featured a story on the controversy, following which it and the Associated Press were provided a letter by United States Secretary of Education Arne Duncan, in which he wrote that it was "troubling to see North Carolina's Wake County school board take steps to reverse a long-standing policy to promote racial diversity in its schools" and "urge[d] school boards across America to fully consider the consequences before taking such action". The situation was also lampooned on The Colbert Report. According to The Washington Post, the decision has been backed by prominent members of the Tea Party movement.

Some strides have been made towards compromise in Wake County between proponents and critics of the old integration plan. Michael Alves, an education consultant with 30 years of experience designing and implementing choice-based student assignment plans in districts across the United States, has developed an integration by achievement plan for Wake County. Integration by achievement will assign students to schools based on their previous achievements on standardised state test scores. Schools will have 70% of its students' scores at or above the proficient level while the remaining 30% scores below the proficient level. The plan stipulates that once a child is placed in a school, he or she cannot be reassigned during their time in that school. The Greater Raleigh Chamber of Commerce, the area's largest business membership organisation, has suggested this plan to the Wake County school board.

=== LGBT flashcards controversy ===
In May 2022, a teacher in a preschool classroom at Ballentine Elementary School (part of the Wake County Public School System) in Fuquay-Varina was revealed to have shown her students LGBT-themed flashcards to teach them the colors of the rainbow, with one of the flashcards depicting a pregnant man. The flashcards were removed from the school. A Wake County spokesperson stated, "An initial review determined that flash cards were not tied to the district's Pre-K curriculum, did not complement, enrich, or extend the curriculum, and were used without the principal's review, knowledge, and/or approval." The teacher later resigned.

== List of schools ==
As of the 2023–2024 school year, WCPSS has a total of 198 schools in its district. A list of all 198 schools and information associated with them can be found in the main article linked above.

== Demographics ==
As of the 2018–2019 school year, the Wake County student body is split 51.2% male with a total of 82,424 students and 48.8% female representing a total of 78,535 students.

Total	American Indian	Asian	Black	Hispanic	Pacific Islander	Two or more	White
160,959	398	15,001	36,545	29,031	194	6,122	73,668
100%	0.25%	9.3%	22.7%	18.0%	0.1%	3.8%	45.8%

== See also ==
- The End of Consensus - About the disestablishment of socioeconomic balancing in Wake County
