= Fuquay Springs Historic District =

Historic district in North Carolina, United States

- U.S. National Register of Historic Places
- U.S. Historic district
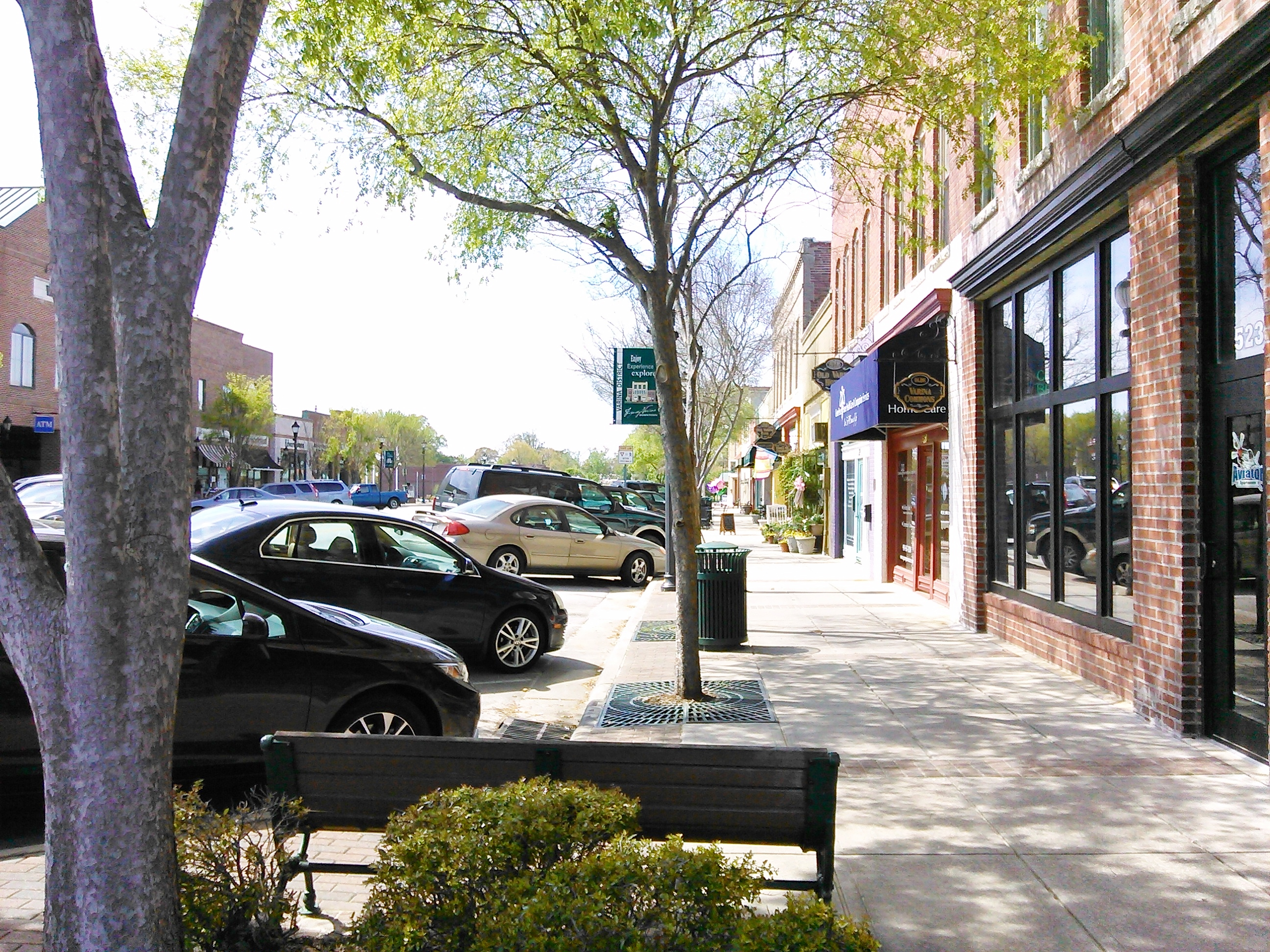
- Fuquay Varina Downtown, April 2014

- Location within North Carolina Location within the United States
- Location: Roughly, S. Main St. and Fuquay Ave. from Spring St. to Sunset Dr. and Spring St. from Spring Ave. to Angier Rd.S. Main Street on the east; Sunset Drive on the south; Kite Drive on the west; W. Spring Street on the north, Fuquay-Varina, North Carolina
- Coordinates: 35°34′49″N 78°47′55″W
- Area: 23.26 acres (9.41 ha)
- Built: c. 1899
- Architect: Hairr, A. Y.
- Architectural style: Queen Anne, Colonial Revival, Tudor Revival, Bungalow/craftsman
- MPS: Wake County MPS
- NRHP reference No.: 96001398, 14000230 (Boundary Increase)
- Added to NRHP: November 29, 1996, May 19, 2014 (Boundary Increase)

Fuquay Springs Historic District is a national historic district located at Fuquay-Varina, Wake County, North Carolina. The districts encompasses 36 contributing buildings and 1 contributing site in the town of Fuquay-Varina. The predominantly residential district developed between about 1899 and 1946, and includes notable examples of Queen Anne, Colonial Revival, Tudor Revival, and Bungalow / American Craftsman architecture. Located in the district are the separately listed Ben-Wiley Hotel and Fuquay Mineral Spring. Other notable buildings include the Varina Mercantile Building (1899), Barham Hotel (c. 1908), Ballentine-Spence House (c. 1910, 1927), Barbour-Perkins House (c. 1928), Proctor House (1925), and Harold Johnson House (1938).

It was listed on the National Register of Historic Places in 1996, with a boundary increase in 2014.
