= List of Pi Delta Phi chapters =

Pi Delta Phi is an international collegiate French honor society. It was formed at the University of California, Berkeley in 1906. In the following list, active chapters are indicated in bold and inactive chapters and institutions are in italics.

Number	Chapter	Charter date and range	Institution	Location	State or region	Status	Ref.
1	**Alpha**	1906	University of California, Berkeley	Berkeley, California	CA	Active	
2	**Beta**	1925	University of Southern California	Los Angeles, California	CA	Active	
3	**Gamma**	1926	University of California, Los Angeles	Los Angeles, California	CA	Active	
4	**Delta**	1927	Mississippi University for Women	Columbus, Mississippi	MS	Active	
5	**Epsilon**	1927	University of Illinois Urbana-Champaign	Urbana, Illinois	IL	Active	
6	**Zeta**	1928	University of Oregon	Eugene, Oregon	OR	Active	
7	**Eta**	1930	University of Kansas	Lawrence, Kansas	KS	Active	
8	**Theta**	1930	Rice University	Houston, Texas	TX	Active	
9	**Iota**	1934	Stanford University	Stanford, California	CA	Active	
10	**Kappa**	1936	Cornell University	Ithaca, New York	NY	Active	
11	**Lambda**	1936	University of Montevallo	Montevallo, Alabama	AL	Active	
12	**Mu**	1936	Dominican University of California	San Rafael, California	CA	Active	
13	Nu	1938	Lone Mountain College	San Francisco, California	CA	Inactive	(Note: The University of San Francisco acquired the college in 1978.)
14	**Xi**	1938	University of Pennsylvania	Philadelphia, Pennsylvania	PA	Active	
15	**Omicron**	1938	Florida State University	Tallahassee, Florida	FL	Active	
16	**Pi**	1941	University of Arizona	Tucson, Arizona	AZ	Active	
17	**Rho**	1944	University of Texas at Austin	Austin, Texas	TX	Active	
18	**Sigma**	1946	Hunter College	New York City, New York	NY	Active	
19	**Tau**	1948	Southern Methodist University	Dallas, Texas	TX	Active	
20	**Upsilon**	1948	New York University	New York City, New York	NY	Active	
21	**Phi**	1948	Notre Dame of Maryland University	Baltimore, Maryland	MD	Active	
22	**Chi**	1948	Kent State University	Kent, Ohio	OH	Active	
23	**Psi**	1948	University of Louisiana at Lafayette	Lafayette, Louisiana	LA	Active	
24	Omega	1949	Saint Joseph College	Emmitsburg, Maryland	MD	Inactive	(Note: The college closed in May 1973.)
25	Alpha Alpha	1949	Barat College	Lake Forest, Illinois	IL	Inactive	(Note: The college closed in 2005 after being purchased and absorbed by DePaul University.)
26	**Alpha Beta**	1949	Denison University	Granville, Ohio	OH	Active	
27	**Alpha Gamma**	1949	University of Tennessee	Knoxville, Tennessee	TN	Active	
28	**Alpha Delta**	1949	St. Catherine University	Saint Paul, Minnesota	MN	Active	
29	**Alpha Epsilon**	1949	Mount Saint Mary's University, Los Angeles	Los Angeles, California	CA	Active	
30	**Alpha Zeta**	1949	Lincoln Memorial University	Harrogate, Tennessee	TN	Active	
31	**Alpha Eta**	1949	Miami University	Oxford, Ohio	OH	Active	(Note: Formerly a chapter of Beta Pi Theta.)
32	**Alpha Theta**	1949	Brooklyn College	Brooklyn, New York	NY	Active	
33	**Alpha Iota**	1950	University of North Texas	Denton, Texas	TX	Active	
34	**Alpha Kappa**	1950	University of Southern Mississippi	Hattiesburg, Mississippi	MS	Active	
35	**Alpha Lambda**	1950	University of Iowa	Iowa City, Iowa	IA	Active	
36	**Alpha Mu**	1950	Winthrop University	Rock Hill, South Carolina	SC	Active	
37	**Alpha Nu**	1950	Adrian College	Adrian, Michigan	MI	Active	
38	**Alpha Xi**	1950	University of Minnesota	Minneapolis, Minnesota	MN	Active	
39	**Alpha Omicron**	1950	West Virginia University	Morgantown, West Virginia	WV	Active	
40	**Alpha Pi**	1951	Marquette University	Milwaukee, Wisconsin	WI	Active	
41	**Alpha Rho**	1951	Bucknell University	Lewisburg, Pennsylvania	PA	Active	
42	Alpha Sigma	1951	Marylhurst University	Maryhurst, Oregon	OR	Inactive	(Note: The college closed in 2018.)
43	**Alpha Tau**	1951	Dominican University	River Forest, Illinois	IL	Active	
44	**Alpha Upsilon**	1951	Marshall University	Huntington, West Virginia	WV	Active	
45	**Alpha Phi**	1951	University of Texas at El Paso	El Paso, Texas	TX	Active	
46	Alpha Chi	1951	College of Saint Teresa	Winona, Minnesota	MN	Inactive	(Note: College closed in 1989.)
47	**Alpha Psi**	1951	La Salle University	Philadelphia, Pennsylvania	PA	Active	
48	**Alpha Omega**	1952	Yeshiva University	New York City, New York	NY	Active	
49	**Beta Alpha**	1952	University of North Carolina at Chapel Hill	Chapel Hill, North Carolina	NC	Active	
50	**Beta Beta**	1952	University of Houston	Houston, Texas	TX	Active	
51	**Beta Gamma**	1952	University of Miami	Coral Gables, Florida	FL	Active	
52	**Beta Delta**	1952	City College of New York	New York City, New York	NY	Active	
53	**Beta Epsilon**	1952	College of William & Mary	Williamsburg, Virginia	VA	Active	
54	**Beta Zeta**	1953	Samford University	Homewood, Alabama	AL	Active	(Note: Chapter formed at Howard College, now called Samford University.)
55	**Beta Eta**	1953	University of Detroit Mercy	Detroit, Michigan	MI	Active	
56	**Beta Theta**	1953	Southern Arkansas University	Magnolia, Arkansas	AR	Active	
57	**Beta Iota**	1954	Temple University	Philadelphia, Pennsylvania	PA	Active	
58	**Beta Kappa**	1954	Webster University	Webster Groves, Missouri	MO	Active	
59	**Beta Lambda**	1955	North Carolina A&T State University	Greensboro, North Carolina	NC	Active	
60	**Beta Mu**	1956	Carson–Newman University	Jefferson City, Tennessee	TN	Active	
61	**Beta Nu**	1956	University of Wisconsin–Eau Claire	Eau Claire, Wisconsin	WI	Active	
62	**Beta Xi**	1956	Texas Tech University	Lubbock, Texas	TX	Active	
63	**Beta Omicron**	1956	Tennessee State University	Nashville, Tennessee	TN	Active	
64	**Beta Pi**	1956	West Virginia State University	Institute, West Virginia	WV	Active	
65	Beta Rho	1956	Judson College	Marion, Alabama	AL	Inactive	(Note: The college closed in July 2021.)
66	**Beta Sigma**	1956	Georgetown College	Georgetown, Kentucky	KY	Active	
67	**Beta Tau**	1956	University of Toledo	Toledo, Ohio	OH	Active	
68	**Beta Upsilon**	1956	Morehouse College	Atlanta, Georgia	GA	Active	
69	**Beta Phi**	1957	Millsaps College	Jackson, Mississippi	MS	Active	
70	**Beta Chi**	1957	Avila University	Kansas City, Missouri	MO	Active	
71	**Beta Psi**	1958	DePaul University	Chicago, Illinois	IL	Active	
72	**Beta Omega**	1958	University of Cincinnati	Cincinnati, Ohio	OH	Active	
73	**Gamma Alpha**	1958	Arcadia University	Glenside, Pennsylvania	PA	Active	
74	Gamma Beta	1959	Holy Names University	Oakland, California	CA	Inactive	(Note: The college closed in 2023.)
75	**Gamma Gamma**	1959	Adelphi University	Garden City, New York	NY	Active	
76	**Gamma Delta**	1960	University of North Carolina at Greensboro	Greensboro, North Carolina	NC	Active	
77	**Gamma Epsilon**	1960	Texas Southern University	Houston, Texas	TX	Active	
78	Gamma Zeta	1960	Mundelein College	Chicago, Illinois	IL	Inactive	(Note: The college was absorbed by Loyola University Chicago.)
79	**Gamma Eta**	1962	University of St. Thomas	Houston, Texas	TX	Active	
80	**Gamma Theta**	1962	North Carolina Central University	Durham, North Carolina	NC	Active	
81	**Gamma Iota**	1962	Bowling Green State University	Bowling Green, Ohio	OH	Active	
82	**Gamma Kappa**	1962	Montclair State University	Montclair, New Jersey	NJ	Active	
83	Gamma Lambda	1962	Fort Wright College	Toppenish, Washington	WA	Inactive	
84	**Gamma Mu**	1962	Hope College	Holland, Michigan	MI	Active	
85	**Gamma Nu**	1962	Oregon State University	Corvallis, Oregon	OR	Active	
86	**Gamma Xi**	1962	Trinity Washington University	Washington, D.C.	DC	Active	
87	**Gamma Omicron**	1962	Dickinson College	Carlisle, Pennsylvania	PA	Active	
88	**Gamma Pi**	1963	Emporia State University	Emporia, Kansas	KS	Active	
89	**Gamma Rho**	1963	Hofstra University	Hempstead, New York	NY	Active	
90	**Gamma Sigma**	1963	Slippery Rock University	Slippery Rock, Pennsylvania	PA	Active	
91	**Gamma Tau**	1963	Purdue University	West Lafayette, Indiana	IN	Active	
92	**Gamma Upsilon**	1963	Mercyhurst University	Erie, Pennsylvania	PA	Active	
93	**Gamma Phi**	1963	Appalachian State University	Boone, North Carolina	NC	Active	
94	**Gamma Chi**	1963	Regis University	Denver, Colorado	CO	Active	
95	**Gamma Psi**	1963	Brigham Young University	Provo, Utah	UT	Active	
96	**Gamma Omega**	1963	Loyola University Chicago	Chicago, Illinois	IL	Active	
97	**Delta Alpha**	1964	University of Nebraska at Kearney	Kearney, Nebraska	NE	Active	
98	**Delta Beta**	1964	Georgian Court University	Lakewood Township, New Jersey	NJ	Active	
99	**Delta Gamma**	1964	Maryville College	Maryville, Tennessee	TN	Active	
100	**Delta Delta**	1964	Notre Dame College	South Euclid, Ohio	OH	Active	
101	**Delta Epsilon**	1964	Western Kentucky University	Bowling Green, Kentucky	KY	Active	
102	Delta Zeta	1964	Marygrove College	Detroit, Michigan	MI	Inactive	(Note: The college closed in December 2019.)
103	**Delta Eta**	1964	University of Science and Arts of Oklahoma	Chickasha, Oklahoma	OK	Active	
104	**Delta Theta**	1965	Drury University	Springfield, Missouri	MO	Active	
105	**Delta Iota**	1965	Nazareth University	Pittsford, New York	NY	Active	
106	**Delta Kappa**	1965	Trinity University	San Antonio, Texas	TX	Active	
107	**Delta Lambda**	1965	University of Memphis	Memphis, Tennessee	TN	Active	
108	**Delta Mu**	1965	Mississippi State University	Mississippi State, Mississippi	MS	Active	
109	**Delta Nu**	1965	Baylor University	Waco, Texas	TX	Active	
110	**Delta Xi**	1965	University of Hawaiʻi at Mānoa	Honolulu, Hawaii	HI	Active	
111	**Delta Omicron**	1965	Rowan University	Glassboro, New Jersey	NJ	Active	
112	**Delta Pi**	1965	St. John's University	New York City, New York	NY	Active	
113	**Delta Rho**	1965	Westminster College	New Wilmington, Pennsylvania	PA	Active	
114	**Delta Sigma**	1965	University of Connecticut	Storrs, Connecticut	CT	Active	
115	**Delta Tau**	1965	Auburn University	Auburn, Alabama	AL	Active	
116	**Delta Upsilon**	1965	University of Kentucky	Lexington, Kentucky	KY	Active	
117	**Delta Phi**	1966	Radford University	Radford, Virginia	VA	Active	
118	Delta Chi	1966	Marillac College	St. Louis, Missouri	MO	Inactive	(Note: The college closed in 1974.)
119	**Delta Psi**	1966	Illinois State University	Normal, Illinois	IL	Active	
120	**Delta Omega**	1966	University of Mississippi	University, Mississippi	MS	Active	
121	**Epsilon Alpha**	1966	Austin College	Sherman, Texas	TX	Active	
122	**Epsilon Beta**	1966	University of Montana	Missoula, Montana	MT	Active	
123	**Epsilon Gamma**	1966	Rider College	Lawrence Township, New Jersey	NJ	Active	
124	**Epsilon Delta**	1967	Saint Louis University	St. Louis, Missouri	MO	Active	
125	**Epsilon Epsilon**	1967	Queens College, City University of New York	Flushing, Queens, New York City, New York	NY	Active	
126	**Epsilon Zeta**	1967	San Diego State University	San Diego, California	CA	Active	
127	**Epsilon Eta**	1967	University of Utah	Salt Lake City, Utah	UT	Active	
128	**Epsilon Theta**	1967	University of San Diego	San Diego, California	CA	Active	
129	**Epsilon Iota**	1967	Lamar University	Beaumont, Texas	TX	Active	
130	**Epsilon Kappa**	1967	Commonwealth University-Mansfield	Mansfield, Pennsylvania	PA	Active	
131	**Epsilon Lambda**	1967	Frostburg State University	Frostburg, Maryland	MD	Active	
132	**Epsilon Mu**	1967	University of Wisconsin–Whitewater	Whitewater, Wisconsin	WI	Active	
133	**Epsilon Nu**	1967	California State University, Los Angeles	Los Angeles, California	CA	Active	
134	**Epsilon Xi**	1967	University of Tennessee at Chattanooga	Chattanooga, Tennessee	TN	Active	
135	Epsilon Omicron	1968	Fontbonne University	Clayton, Missouri	MO	Inactive	
136	**Epsilon Pi**	1968	Colorado State University Pueblo	Pueblo, Colorado	CO	Active	
137	**Epsilon Rho**	1968	State University of New York at Fredonia	Fredonia, New York	NY	Active	
138	**Epsilon Sigma**	1968	Wichita State University	Wichita, Kansas	KS	Active	
139	**Epsilon Tau**	1968	Texas State University	San Marcos, Texas	TX	Active	
140	**Epsilon Upsilon**	1968	Indiana University of Pennsylvania	Indiana, Pennsylvania	PA	Active	
141	**Epsilon Phi**	1969	University of Arkansas at Little Rock	Little Rock, Arkansas	AR	Active	
142	**Epsilon Chi**	1969	Ohio Northern University	Ada, Ohio	OH	Active	
143	**Epsilon Psi**	1969	Maryville University	Town and Country, Missouri	MO	Active	
144	**Epsilon Omega**	1969	Loyola Marymount University	Los Angeles, California	CA	Active	
145	**Zeta Alpha**	1969	Susquehanna University	Selinsgrove, Pennsylvania	PA	Active	
146	**Zeta Beta**	1969	California State University, Sacramento	Sacramento, California	CA	Active	
147	**Zeta Gamma**	1969	University at Albany, SUNY	Albany, New York	NY	Active	
148	**Zeta Delta**	1969	Southern Illinois University Edwardsville	Edwardsville, Illinois	IL	Active	
149	**Zeta Epsilon**	1969	Fairfield University	Fairfield, Connecticut	CT	Active	
150	**Zeta Zeta**	1969	University of Georgia	Athens, Georgia	GA	Active	
151	**Zeta Eta**	1969	University of Akron	Akron, Ohio	OH	Active	
152	**Zeta Theta**	1969	California State University, Long Beach	Long Beach, California	CA	Active	
153	**Zeta Iota**	1969	University of Portland	Portland, Oregon	OR	Active	
154	**Zeta Kappa**	1970	University of Nevada, Reno	Reno, Nevada	NV	Active	
155	**Zeta Lambda**	1970	Buena Vista University	Storm Lake, Iowa	IA	Active	
156	**Zeta Mu**	1970	University of Charleston	Charleston, West Virginia	WV	Active	
157	**Zeta Nu**	1970	Southwestern University	Georgetown, Texas	TX	Active	
158	**Zeta Xi**	1970	California State University, San Bernardino	San Bernardino, California	CA	Active	
159	**Zeta Omicron**	1970	Murray State University	Murray, Kentucky	KY	Active	
160	**Zeta Pi**	1970	Lindenwood University	St. Charles, Missouri	MO	Active	
161	**Zeta Rho**	1970	Georgia Southern University	Statesboro, Georgia	GA	Active	
162	**Zeta Sigma**	1970	Lehman College	Bronx, New York City, New York	NY	Active	
163	**Zeta Tau**	1970	Whittier College	Whittier, California	CA	Active	
164	**Zeta Upsilon**	1970	Randolph–Macon College	Ashland, Virginia	VA	Active	
165	**Zeta Phi**	1971	University of Rhode Island	Kingston, Rhode Island	RI	Active	
166	**Zeta Chi**	1971	California Lutheran University	Thousand Oaks, California	CA	Active	
167	**Zeta Psi**	1971	East Texas A&M University	Commerce, Texas	TX	Active	
168	**Zeta Omega**	1971	Central Michigan University	Mount Pleasant, Michigan	MI	Active	
169	Eta Alpha	1971	Dominican College	Houston, Texas	TX	Inactive	(Note: The college closed in 1975.)
170	**Eta Beta**	1971	West Texas A&M University	Canyon, Texas	TX	Active	
171	**Eta Gamma**	1971	Pennsylvania Western University, Edinboro	Edinboro, Pennsylvania	PA	Active	
172	**Eta Delta**	1971	St. Lawrence University	Canton, New York	NY	Active	
173	**Eta Epsilon**	1971	Georgia Southwestern State University	Americus, Georgia	GA	Active	
174	**Eta Zeta**	1971	Georgia Southern University–Armstrong Campus	Savannah, Georgia	GA	Active	
175	**Eta Eta**	1972	Thiel College	Greenville, Pennsylvania	PA	Active	
176	**Eta Theta**	1972	St. Bonaventure University	St. Bonaventure, New York	NY	Active	
177	**Eta Iota**	1972	Sam Houston State University	Huntsville, Texas	TX	Active	
178	**Eta Kappa**	1972	Pace University	New York City, New York	NY	Active	
179	**Eta Lambda**	1972	Roanoke College	Salem, Virginia	VA	Active	
180	**Eta Mu**	1972	George Washington University	Washington, D.C.	DC	Active	
181	**Eta Nu**	1973	St. John Fisher College	Rochester, New York	NY	Active	
182	**Eta Xi**	1973	St. Augustine's University	Raleigh, North Carolina	NC	Active	
183	**Eta Omicron**	1973	University of Delaware	Newark, Delaware	DE	Active	
184	**Eta Pi**	1973	Bethany College	Lindsborg, Kansas	KS	Active	
185	**Eta Rho**	1973	Missouri State University	Springfield, Missouri	MO	Active	
186	**Eta Sigma**	1973	University of Alabama	Tuscaloosa, Alabama	AL	Active	
187	**Eta Tau**	1974	Hobart and William Smith Colleges	Geneva, New York	NY	Active	
188	**Eta Upsilon**	1974	University of California, Davis	Davis, California	CA	Active	
189	**Eta Phi**	1974	Pepperdine University	Malibu, California	CA	Active	
190	**Eta Chi**	1974	California State University, Dominguez Hills	Carson, California	CA	Active	
191	**Eta Psi**	1974	University of North Carolina at Asheville	Asheville, North Carolina	NC	Active	
192	**Eta Omega**	1975	University of Arkansas	Fayetteville, Arkansas	AR	Active	
193	**Theta Alpha**	1975	Clemson University	Clemson, South Carolina	SC	Active	
194	**Theta Beta**	1975	University of South Carolina	Columbia, South Carolina	SC	Active	
195	**Theta Gamma**	1975	Columbia College	Columbia, South Carolina	SC	Active	
196	**Theta Delta**	1975	State University of New York at Oswego	Oswego, New York	NY	Active	
197	**Theta Epsilon**	1975	Wright State University	Dayton, Ohio	OH	Active	
198	**Theta Zeta**	1975	University of Louisville	Louisville, Kentucky	KY	Active	
199	**Theta Eta**	1975	Salve Regina University	Newport, Rhode Island	RI	Active	
200	**Theta Theta**	1975	East Tennessee State University	Johnson City, Tennessee	TN	Active	
201	**Theta Iota**	1976	Texas A&M University	College Station, Texas	TX	Active	
202	**Theta Kappa**	1976	Hood College	Frederick, Maryland	MD	Active	
203	**Theta Lambda**	1976	University of California, Santa Barbara	Santa Barbara, California	CA	Active	
204	**Theta Mu**	1976	Eastern Illinois University	Charleston, Illinois	IL	Active	
205	**Theta Nu**	1976	Valdosta State University	Valdosta, Georgia	GA	Active	
206	**Theta Xi**	1977	Georgetown University	Washington, D.C.	DC	Active	
207	**Theta Omicron**	1977	Old Dominion University	Norfolk, Virginia	VA	Active	
208	**Theta Pi**	1977	University of Tennessee at Martin	Martin, Tennessee	TN	Active	
209	**Theta Rho**	1977	State University of New York at Cortland	Cortland, New York	NY	Active	
210	**Theta Sigma**	1977	Saint Mary-of-the-Woods College	Saint Mary-of-the-Woods, Indiana	IN	Active	
211	**Theta Tau**	1978	Loyola University New Orleans	New Orleans, Louisiana	LA	Active	
212	**Theta Upsilon**	1978	Wofford College	Spartanburg, South Carolina	SC	Active	
213	**Theta Phi**	1978	Ohio State University	Columbus, Ohio	OH	Active	
214	**Theta Chi**	1978	University of the Pacific	Stockton, California	CA	Active	
215	**Theta Psi**	1978	Morgan State University	Baltimore, Maryland	MD	Active	
216	**Theta Omega**	1978	Immaculata University	East Whiteland Township, Pennsylvania	PA	Active	
217	**Iota Alpha**	1978	Southeastern Louisiana University	Hammond, Louisiana	LA	Active	
218	**Iota Beta**	1978	Howard University	Washington, D.C.	DC	Active	
219	**Iota Gamma**	1979	Rutgers University–New Brunswick	New Brunswick, New Jersey	NJ	Active	
220	**Iota Delta**	1979	University of Redlands	Redlands, California	CA	Active	
221	**Iota Epsilon**	1979	Northeastern Illinois University	Chicago, Illinois	IL	Active	
222	**Iota Zeta**	1980	State University of New York at Potsdam	Potsdam, New York	NY	Active	
223	Iota Eta	1980	Lambuth University	Jackson, Tennessee	TN	Inactive	
224	**Iota Theta**	1981	IAU College	Aix-en-Provence, Provence-Alpes-Côte d'Azur, France	PACA	Active	
225	**Iota Kappa**	1981	Valparaiso University	Valparaiso, Indiana	IN	Active	
226	**Iota Lambda**	1981	Hillsdale College	Hillsdale, Michigan	MI	Active	
227	**Iota Mu**	1981	Albright College	Reading, Pennsylvania	PA	Active	
228	**Iota Nu**	1982	Mount St. Mary's University	Emmitsburg, Maryland	MD	Active	
229	**Iota Xi**	1982	Northern Arizona University	Flagstaff, Arizona	AZ	Active	
230	**Iota Omicron**	1983	Xavier University	Cincinnati, Ohio	OH	Active	
231	**Iota Pi**	1983	Manhattan University	Riverdale, Bronx, New York City, New York	NY	Active	
232	**Iota Rho**	1984	University of Nebraska Omaha	Omaha, Nebraska	NE	Active	
233	**Iota Sigma**	1984	Louisiana Tech University	Ruston, Louisiana	LA	Active	
234	**Iota Tau**	1984	Truman State University	Kirksville, Missouri	MO	Active	
235	**Iota Upsilon**	1986	Gustavus Adolphus College	St. Peter, Minnesota	MN	Active	
236	**Iota Phi**	1986	Salisbury University	Salisbury, Maryland	MD	Active	
237	**Iota Chi**	1986	De Pauw University	Greencastle, Indiana	IN	Active	
238	**Iota Psi**	1986	University of Wisconsin–La Crosse	La Crosse, Wisconsin	WI	Active	
239	**Iota Omega**	1987	Meredith College	Raleigh, North Carolina	NC	Active	
240	**Kappa Alpha**	1987	Virginia Military Institute	Lexington, Virginia	VA	Active	
241	**Kappa Beta**	1987	American University of Paris	Paris, Île-de-France, France	IDF	Active	
242	**Kappa Gamma**	1987	Morehead State University	Morehead, Kentucky	KY	Active	
243	**Kappa Delta**	1988	Loyola University Maryland	Baltimore, Maryland	MD	Active	
244	**Kappa Epsilon**	1989	Saint Anselm College	Manchester, New Hampshire	NH	Active	
245	**Kappa Zeta**	1989	Kansas State University	Manhattan, Kansas	KS	Active	
246	**Kappa Eta**	1989	John Carroll University	Cleveland, Ohio	OH	Active	
247	**Kappa Theta**	1989	University of Buffalo	Buffalo, New York	NY	Active	
248	**Kappa Iota**	1989	Longwood University	Farmville, Virginia	VA	Active	
249	**Kappa Kappa**	1990	Agnes Scott College	Decatur, Georgia	GA	Active	
250	**Kappa Lambda**	1990	Vanderbilt University	Nashville, Tennessee	TN	Active	
251	**Kappa Mu**	1990	High Point University	High Point, North Carolina	NC	Active	
252	**Kappa Nu**	1990	Villanova University	Villanova, Pennsylvania	PA	Active	
253	**Kappa Xi**	1990	University of Minnesota Morris	Morris, Minnesota	MN	Active	
254	**Kappa Omicron**	1990	Colorado College	Colorado Springs, Colorado	CO	Active	
255	**Kappa Pi**	1990	Towson University	Towson, Maryland	MD	Active	
256	**Kappa Rho**	1990	Florida Atlantic University	Boca Raton, Florida	FL	Active	
257	**Kappa Sigma**	1991	Keene State College	Keene, New Hampshire	NH	Active	
258	**Kappa Tau**	1991	Western Michigan University	Kalamazoo, Michigan	MI	Active	
259	**Kappa Upsilon**	1991	Southern Illinois University Carbondale	Carbondale, Illinois	IL	Active	
260	**Kappa Phi**	1991	Westfield State University	Westfield, Massachusetts	MA	Active	
261	**Kappa Chi**	1991	St. Olaf College	Northfield, Minnesota	MN	Active	
262	**Kappa Psi**	1991	Florida International University	University Park, Florida	FL	Active	
263	**Kappa Omega**	1991	Arizona State University	Tempe, Arizona	AZ	Active	
264	**Lambda Alpha**	1991	St. Cloud State University	St. Cloud, Minnesota	MN	Active	
265	**Lambda Beta**	1992	College of the Holy Cross	Worcester, Massachusetts	MA	Active	
266	**Lambda Gamma**	1992	University of the Cumberlands	Williamsburg, Kentucky	KY	Active	
267	**Lambda Delta**	1992	Taylor University	Upland, Indiana	IN	Active	
268	**Lambda Epsilon**	1992	Ithaca College	Ithaca, New York	NY	Active	
269	Lambda Zeta	1993	Indiana University–Purdue University Indianapolis	Indianapolis, Indiana	IN	Inactive	(Note: In 2024, IUPUI split into Indiana University Indianapolis and Purdue University in Indianapolis.)
270	**Lambda Eta**	1993	Iowa State University	Ames, Iowa	IA	Active	
271	**Lambda Theta**	1993	College of Charleston	Charleston, South Carolina	SC	Active	
272	**Lambda Iota**	1993	Virginia Wesleyan College	Virginia Beach, Virginia	VA	Active	
273	**Lambda Kappa**	1993	Kennesaw State University	Marietta, Georgia	GA	Active	
274	**Lambda Lambda**	1994	Oral Roberts University	Tulsa, Oklahoma	OK	Active	
275	**Lambda Mu**	1995	The Citadel	Charleston, South Carolina	SC	Active	
276	**Lambda Nu**	1995	Centenary College of Louisiana	Shreveport, Louisiana	LA	Active	
277	**Lambda Xi**	1995	Drew University	Madison, New Jersey	NJ	Active	
278	**Lambda Omicron**	1995	Elon University	Elon, North Carolina	NC	Active	
279	**Lambda Pi**	1996	Greensboro College	Greensboro, North Carolina	NC	Active	
280	**Lambda Rho**	1996	Stetson University	DeLand, Florida	FL	Active	
281	**Lambda Sigma**	1996	Washington & Jefferson College	Washington, Pennsylvania	PA	Active	
282	**Lambda Tau**	1996	Lafayette College	Easton, Pennsylvania	PA	Active	
283	**Lambda Upsilon**	1996	Transylvania University	Lexington, Kentucky	KY	Active	
284	**Lambda Phi**	1996	Framingham State University	Framingham, Massachusetts	MA	Active	
285	**Lambda Chi**	1996	University of Central Florida	Orlando, Florida	FL	Active	
286	**Lambda Psi**	1997	Boston College	Chestnut Hill, Massachusetts	MA	Active	
287	**Lambda Omega**	1997	Idaho State University	Pocatello, Idaho	ID	Active	
288	**Mu Alpha**	1997	Augustana University	Sioux Falls, South Dakota	SD	Active	
289	**Mu Beta**	1997	University of Virginia	Charlottesville, Virginia	VA	Active	
290	**Mu Gamma**	1998	University of Wisconsin–Milwaukee	Milwaukee, Wisconsin	WI	Active	
291	**Mu Delta**	1998	University of North Georgia	Dahlonega, Georgia	GA	Active	
292	**Mu Epsilon**	1998	Grand Valley State University	Allendale, Michigan	MI	Active	
293	**Mu Zeta**	1998	Gardner–Webb University	Boiling Springs, North Carolina	NC	Active	
294	**Mu Eta**	1998	Berry College	Mount Berry, Georgia	GA	Active	
295	**Mu Theta**	1998	Marietta College	Marietta, Ohio	OH	Active	
296	**Mu Iota**	1998	State University of New York at Geneseo	Geneseo, New York	NY	Active	
297	**Mu Kappa**	1999	Michigan State University	East Lansing, Michigan	MI	Active	
298	**Mu Lambda**	1999	Hollins University	Hollins, Virginia	VA	Active	
299	**Mu Mu**	2000	Wheaton College	Norton, Massachusetts	MA	Active	
300	**Mu Nu**	2001	Lee University	Cleveland, Tennessee	TN	Active	
301	**Mu Xi**	1999	University of New Hampshire	Durham, New Hampshire	NH	Active	
302	**Mu Omicron**	1999	Assumption University	Worcester, Massachusetts	MA	Active	
303	**Mu Pi**	1999	Western Washington University	Bellingham, Washington	WA	Active	
304	**Mu Rho**	1999	Fordham University	New York City, New York	NY	Active	
305	**Mu Sigma**	2000	Franklin & Marshall College	Lancaster, Pennsylvania	PA	Active	
306	**Mu Tau**	2000	Illinois Wesleyan University	Bloomington, Illinois	IL	Active	
307	**Mu Upsilon**	2000	Rockhurst University	Kansas City, Missouri	MO	Active	
308	**Mu Phi**	2000	University of Notre Dame	Notre Dame, Indiana	IN	Active	
309	**Mu Chi**	2000	University of Louisiana at Monroe	Monroe, Louisiana	LA	Active	
310	**Mu Psi**	2001	Shippensburg University of Pennsylvania	Shippensburg, Pennsylvania	PA	Active	
311	**Mu Omega**	2001	University of Florida	Gainesville, Florida	FL	Active	
312	**Nu Alpha**	2001	Minnesota State University, Mankato	Mankato, Minnesota	MN	Active	
313	**Nu Beta**	200x ?	University of Texas at Arlington	Arlington, Texas	TX	Active	
314	**Nu Gamma**	2002	Stonehill College	North Easton, Massachusetts	MA	Active	
315	**Nu Delta**	2002	University of Pittsburgh	Pittsburgh, Pennsylvania	PA	Active	
316	**Nu Epsilon**	2002	Randolph College	Lynchburg, Virginia	VA	Active	
317	**Nu Zeta**	2002	State University of New York at New Paltz	New Paltz, New York	NY	Active	
318	**Nu Eta**	2002	Duke University	Durham, North Carolina	NC	Active	
319	**Nu Theta**	2003	William Patterson University	Wayne, New Jersey	NJ	Active	
320	**Nu Iota**	2003	Skidmore College	Saratoga Springs, New York	NY	Active	
321	**Nu Kappa**	2003	University of North Carolina Wilmington	Wilmington, North Carolina	NC	Active	
322	**Nu Lambda**	2004	Monmouth College	Monmouth, Illinois	IL	Active	
323	**Nu Mu**	2004	Sweet Briar College	Sweet Briar, Virginia	VA	Active	
324	**Nu Nu**	2004	Rhodes College	Memphis, Tennessee	TN	Active	
325	**Nu Xi**	2004	Hendrix College	Conway, Arkansas	AR	Active	
326	**Nu Omicron**	2004	Emory and Henry College	Emory, Virginia	VA	Active	
327	**Nu Pi**	2005	Le Moyne College	Syracuse, New York	NY	Active	
328	**Nu Rho**	2005	Washington College	Chestertown, Maryland	MD	Active	
329	**Nu Sigma**	2005	Concordia College	Moorhead, Minnesota	MN	Active	
330	**Nu Tau**	2006	Providence College	Providence, Rhode Island	RI	Active	
331	**Nu Upsilon**	2006	Christopher Newport University	Newport News, Virginia	VA	Active	
332	**Nu Phi**	2006	Wesleyan University	Middletown, Connecticut	CT	Active	
333	**Nu Chi**	2006	Canisius College	Buffalo, New York	NY	Active	
334	**Nu Psi**	2006	Cornell College	Mount Vernon, Iowa	IA	Active	
335	**Nu Omega**	2007	Luther College	Decorah, Iowa	IA	Active	
336	**Xi Alpha**	2007	University of Vermont	Burlington, Vermont	VT	Active	
337	**Xi Beta**	2007	Wagner College	Staten Island, New York City, New York	NY	Active	
338	**Xi Gamma**	2007	Indiana University Northwest	Gary, Indiana	IN	Active	
339	**Xi Delta**	2008	University of Colorado Colorado Springs	Colorado Springs, Colorado	CO	Active	
340	**Xi Epsilon**	2008	Coe College	Cedar Rapids, Iowa	IA	Active	
341	**Xi Zeta**	2008	University of Massachusetts Dartmouth	North Dartmouth, Massachusetts	MA	Active	
342	**Xi Eta**	2008	Midwestern State University	Wichita Falls, Texas	TX	Active	
343	**Xi Theta**	2009	Texas Christian University	Fort Worth, Texas	TX	Active	
344	**Xi Iota**	2009	Linfield College	McMinnville, Oregon	OR	Active	
345	**Xi Kappa**	2009	University of Oklahoma	Norman, Oklahoma	OK	Active	
346	**Xi Lambda**	2009	Augsburg University	Minneapolis, Minnesota	MN	Active	
347	**Xi Mu**	2009	Roger Williams University	Bristol, Rhode Island	RI	Active	
348	**Xi Nu**	2009	Creighton University	Omaha, Nebraska	NE	Active	
349	**Xi Xi**	2010	University of Nevada, Las Vegas	Paradise, Nevada	NV	Active	
350	**Xi Omicron**	2010	Pacific University	Forest Grove, Oregon	OR	Active	
351	**Xi Pi**	2010	Davidson College	Davidson, North Carolina	NC	Active	
352	**Xi Rho**	2010	University of Alabama at Birmingham	Birmingham, Alabama	AL	Active	
353	**Xi Sigma**	2011	Butler University	Indianapolis, Indiana	IN	Active	
354	**Xi Tau**	2011	Johns Hopkins University	Baltimore, Maryland	MD	Active	
355	**Xi Upsilon**	2011	Georgia College & State University	Milledgeville, Georgia	GA	Active	
356	**Xi Phi**	2011	Gettysburg College	Gettysburg, Pennsylvania	PA	Active	
357	**Xi Chi**	2011	Virginia Commonwealth University	Richmond, Virginia	VA	Active	
358	**Xi Psi**	2012	North Carolina State University	Raleigh, North Carolina	NC	Active	
359	**Xi Omega**	2012	West Chester University	West Chester, Pennsylvania	PA	Active	
360	**Omicron Alpha**	2012	University of Puerto Rico, Río Piedras Campus	San Juan, Puerto Rico	PR	Active	
361	**Omicron Beta**	2012	George Mason University	Fairfax, Virginia	VA	Active	
362	**Omicron Gamma**	2012	University of San Francisco	San Francisco, California	CA	Active	
363	**Omicron Delta**	2012	North Central College	Naperville, Illinois	IL	Active	
364	**Omicron Epsilon**	April 12, 2012	Catholic University of America	Washington, D.C.	DC	Active	
365	**Omicron Zeta**	2012	Stephen F. Austin University	Nacogdoches, Texas	TX	Active	
366	**Omicron Eta**	2012	Merrimack College	North Andover, Massachusetts	MA	Active	
367	**Omicron Theta**	2013	Asbury University	Wilmore, Kentucky	KY	Active	
368	**Omicron Iota**	2013	Saint Joseph's University	Philadelphia, Pennsylvania	PA	Active	
369	**Omicron Kappa**	2013	State University of New York at Plattsburgh	Plattsburgh, New York	NY	Active	
370	**Omicron Lambda**	2013	Spelman College	Atlanta, Georgia	GA	Active	
371	**Omicron Mu**	2013	University of Colorado Denver	Denver, Colorado	CO	Active	
372	**Omicron Nu**	2013	Ohio University	Athens, Ohio	OH	Active	
373	**Omicron Xi**	2013	North Park University	Chicago, Illinois	IL	Active	
374	**Omicron Omicron**	2013	Colorado State University	Chicago, Illinois	CO	Active	
375	**Omicron Pi**	2014	Virginia Tech	Blacksburg, Virginia	VA	Active	
376	**Omicron Rho**	2014	University of Puget Sound	Tacoma, Washington	WA	Active	
377	**Omicron Sigma**	2015	Pennsylvania State University	University Park, Pennsylvania	PA	Active	
378	**Omicron Tau**	2015	University of Michigan–Dearborn	Dearborn, Michigan	MI	Active	
379	**Omicron Upsilon**	2015	Indiana University Bloomington	Bloomington, Indiana	IN	Active	
380	**Omicron Phi**	2015	Union College	Schenectady, New York	NY	Active	
381	**Omicron Chi**	2015	University of Massachusetts Lowell	Lowell, Massachusetts	MA	Active	
382	**Omicron Psi**	2015	Southern Connecticut State University	New Haven, Connecticut	CT	Active	
383	**Omicron Omega**	2015	Colgate University	Hamilton, New York	NY	Active	
384	**Pi Alpha**	2016	University of Missouri	Columbia, Missouri	MO	Active	
385	**Pi Beta**	2016	University at Buffalo	Buffalo, New York	NY	Active	
386	**Pi Gamma**	2016	Seton Hall University	South Orange, New Jersey	NJ	Active	
387	**Pi Delta**	2016	New Mexico State University	Las Cruces, New Mexico	NM	Active	
388	**Pi Epsilon**	2016	University of Maryland, Baltimore County	Catonsville, Maryland	MD	Active	
389	**Pi Zeta**	2017	Stockton University	Galloway Township, New Jersey	NJ	Active	
390	**Pi Eta**	2017	Syracuse University	Syracuse, New York	NY	Active	
391	**Pi Theta**	2017	St. Mary's College of Maryland	St. Mary's City, Maryland	MD	Active	
392	**Pi Iota**	2017	Juniata College	Huntingdon, Pennsylvania	PA	Active	
393	**Pi Kappa**	2017	Marist College	Poughkeepsie, New York	NY	Active	
394	**Pi Lambda**	2017	Chapman University	Orange, California	CA	Active	
395	**Pi Mu**	2018	Simmons University	Boston, Massachusetts	MA	Active	
396	**Pi Nu**	2018	Marian University	Indianapolis, Indiana	IN	Active	
397	**Pi Xi**	2018	Presbyterian College	Clinton, South Carolina	SC	Active	
398	**Pi Omicron**	2018	Ball State University	Muncie, Indiana	IN	Active	
	Pi Pi					Unassigned	(Note: The Pi Delta Phi executive board retired the Pi Pi name in 2018.)
399	**Pi Rho**	2018	Wayne State University	Detroit, Michigan	MI	Active	
400	**Pi Sigma**	2018	East Carolina University	Greenville, North Carolina	NC	Active	
401	**Pi Tau**	2019	Northeastern University	Boston, Massachusetts	MA	Active	
402	**Pi Upsilon**	2019	University of Rochester	Rochester, New York	NY	Active	
403	**Pi Phi**	2019	University of Maryland, College Park	College Park, Maryland	MD	Active	
404	**Pi Chi**	2019	University of North Alabama	Florence, Alabama	AL	Active	
405	**Phi Psi**	2019	Eckerd College	St. Petersburg, Florida	FL	Active	
406	**Pi Omega**	2021	Lyon College	Batesville, Arkansas	AR	Active	
407	**Rho Alpha**	2022	College of Saint Benedict and Saint John's University	St. Joseph and Collegeville, Minnesota	MN	Active	
408	**Rho Beta**	2022	Georgia Tech	Atlanta, Georgia	GA	Active	
409	**Rho Gamma**	2022	United States Air Force Academy	Colorado Springs, Colorado	CO	Active	
410	**Rho Delta**	2022	Oakland University	Rochester Hills, Michigan	MI	Active	
411	**Rho Epsilon**	2022	Furman University	Greenville, South Carolina	SC	Active	
412	**Rho Zeta**	April 6, 2023	University of Wisconsin–Madison	Madison, Wisconsin	WI	Active	
413	**Rho Eta**	March 30, 2023	Western Illinois University	Macomb, Illinois	IL	Active	
414	**Rho Theta**	April 12, 2023	Weber State University	Ogden, Utah	UT	Active	
415	**Rho Iota**	March 12, 2024	Colby College	Waterville, Maine	ME	Active	
416	**Rho Kappa**	April 23, 2024	Case Western Reserve University	Cleveland, Ohio	OH	Active	
			University of Maine	Orono, Maine	ME	Colony	
