= Fuquay-Varina, North Carolina =

- Town
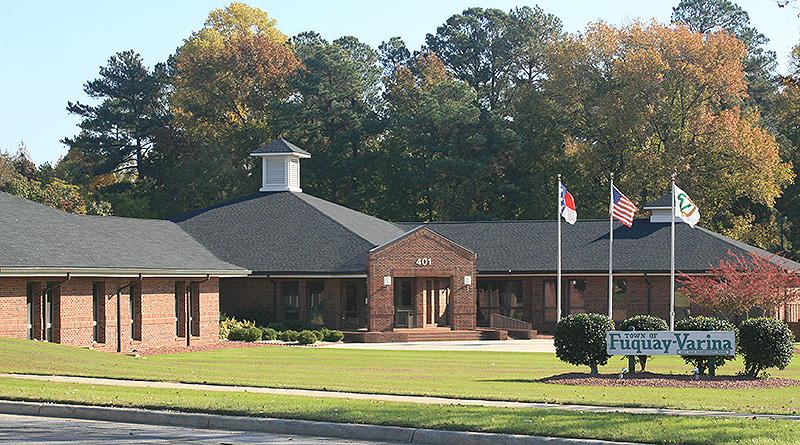

- Flag Seal
- Nicknames: Fuquay, The Quay
- Motto: "A Dash More"
- Location in Wake County and the state of North Carolina.
- Coordinates: 35°35′31″N 78°47′19″W
- Country: United States
- State: North Carolina
- County: Wake
- Incorporated: 1909

Government
  - Type: Council-Manager
  - Mayor: William "Bill" Harris (D)
  - Board of Commissioners: Members: Marilyn Gardner; Bill Harris; Bryan Haynes; Charlie Adcock; Jason Wunsch
  - Town Manager: Adam Mitchell

Area
  - Total: 18.73 sq mi (48.51 km^{2})
  - Land: 18.64 sq mi (48.29 km^{2})
  - Water: 0.085 sq mi (0.22 km^{2})
- Elevation: 390 ft (120 m)

Population (2020)
  - Total: 34,152
  - Density: 1,831.6/sq mi (707.19/km^{2})
- Time zone: UTC−5 (Eastern)
  - Summer (DST): UTC−4 (Eastern)
- ZIP code: 27526
- Area codes: 919/984
- FIPS code: 37-25300
- GNIS feature ID: 2406532
- Website: www.fuquay-varina.org

Fuquay-Varina (/ˈfjuːkweɪ vəˈriːnə/ FYOO-kway vuh-REE-nuh) is a town in southern Wake County, North Carolina, United States, lying south of Holly Springs and southwest of Garner. The population was 34,152 at the 2020 census, and estimated at 48,536 as of July 2025. The hyphenated name attests to the town's history as two separate towns. Fuquay Springs and Varina merged in 1963 to create the modern town. Economically, the town initially grew due to tobacco trade and agriculture, but has seen recent population growth and real estate development due to its proximity to Research Triangle Park.

== History ==
=== Early history ===
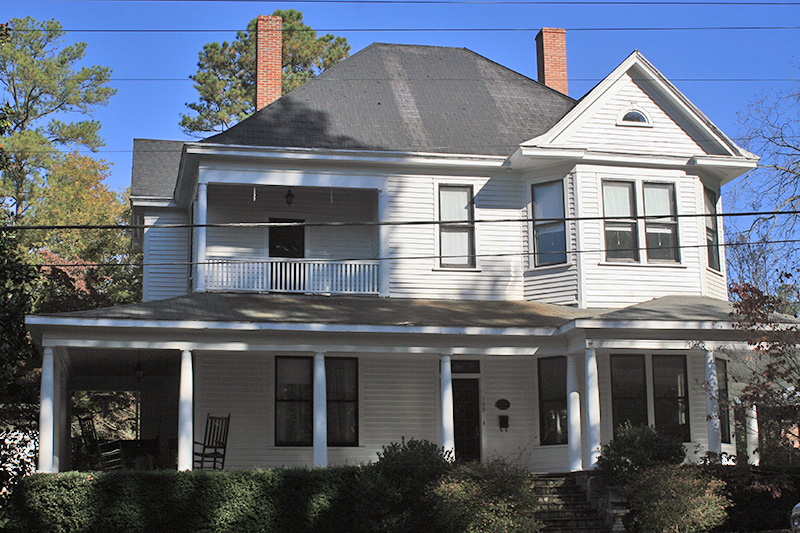
Ballentine Spence House

Frenchman William Fuquay first settled in the small farming town of Sippihaw, named for the original Native American tribe that inhabited the area. Although there is no history of a tribe called Sippihaw, there are historical accounts in the area of a tribe called Susippihaw. Around 1858, while plowing the fields of the family tobacco farm, Stephen Fuquay, son of William, discovered a spring. Originally the spring was used solely for drinking water. Stephen soon came to the conclusion that the mineral water flowing from the springs had healing properties. As word spread, locals began to help the springs establish this reputation, which brought residents from neighboring communities and counties to its waters. The springs were eventually walled in to better serve the tourists coming to the area by road or rail. In 1860, Fuquay sold the springs to a group of local investors who formed the Chalybeate Springs Company to market the attraction and its waters.

J. D. "Squire" Ballentine had been the town's schoolmaster before going off to fight for the Confederate Army. During his tour of duty, he had received letters from one of many southern ladies who wrote to the troops to improve their morale. Originally signing her name "Varina", perhaps an homage to the wife of Jefferson Davis, Virginia Avery would later meet and fall in love with Ballentine. He continued to call her Varina throughout their life together. When he became the first postmaster at the new post office in town in 1880, he named it "Varina" in her honor. A community grew just south of the springs, near the post office and the couple's Varina Mercantile Company general store. In time, it adopted the same name. Ballentine's business success allowed him to construct the Ballentine Spence House in 1910, the first house to have plumbing and electricity in the area. This house, a local historic landmark, still stands today.

=== Growth around the start of the 20th century ===
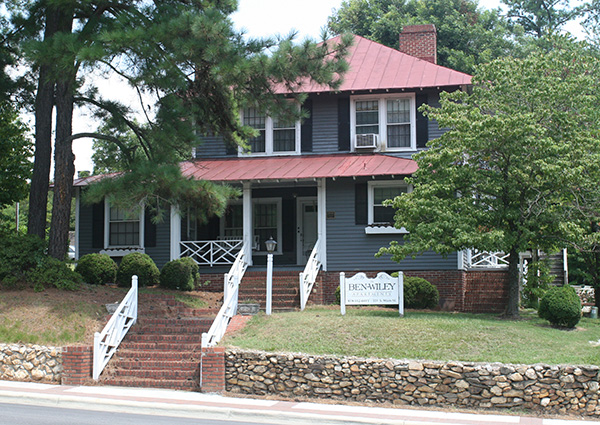
Ben Wiley Hotel

The Fuquay Mineral Spring's popularity grew in the 1890s and around the start of the 20th century as local businessman John Mills developed the idea to offer "Moonlight Excursions" to the springs. He fitted flat rail cars with seats and offered nighttime train trips to southern Wake County from Raleigh. As more guests came to the springs to "take the waters", a group of small hotels sprung up in town, along with restaurants, barbecue stands, and a dance pavilion with a player piano. The town became a tourist destination and was the site of special celebrations on Fourths of July and Easter Mondays. During these events, residents of Raleigh would take the train down to watch the accompanying baseball games and participate in the dances and celebrations. Hotels like the Ben Wiley Hotel (now called the Fuquay Mineral Spring Inn & Garden) catered to the out-of-towners and became as much a center of town life as the springs. In 1902, Sippihaw was renamed "Fuquay Springs" in honor of its founding family and was officially incorporated in 1909.

When it was incorporated, the new Fuquay Springs town limits included the core of the neighboring town of Varina, consisting of its business district and the rail junction of the Cape Fear and Northern Railway and the Norfolk Southern Railway. But Varina reestablished itself the following year when the Varina Union Station was erected and a new post office was created, spurred by the lobbying of Ballentine. Four years later, the Bank of Varina was established, competing directly with the Bank of Fuquay (now Fidelity Bank). Several warehouses for the growing tobacco business were built in town over the next few years, capitalizing on the railroad connections. Another supply store and a knitting factory followed. As Varina came into its own as a hub for area agriculture, the Fuquay Springs Corporation was formed and began bottling and selling mineral water from the springs commercially. Area businesses continued to develop and, in 1927, U.S. Route 401 was paved through town, shortening travel times to Raleigh and nearby communities.

=== Unification and the present ===
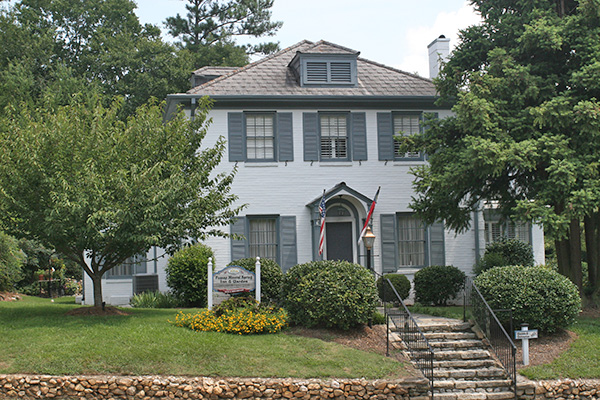
Dr. Wiley S. Cozart House

By this time, Fuquay Springs and Varina had become major trading hubs for southern Wake County as well as neighboring Harnett and Johnston counties. Yet improvements to automobiles and area roads caused a decline in tourism at the springs. Rather than visiting the springs, residents in the region chose to visit the coast as travel times decreased. During this time, however, the tobacco industry continued to drive the area economy, with five warehouses, a cotton buyer, and fifteen stores established by the end of the 1920s. The shared emphasis on agricultural and industrial growth brought the towns to a shared vision, and as their residents worked, played, and attended church together, the towns merged into Fuquay-Varina in 1963.

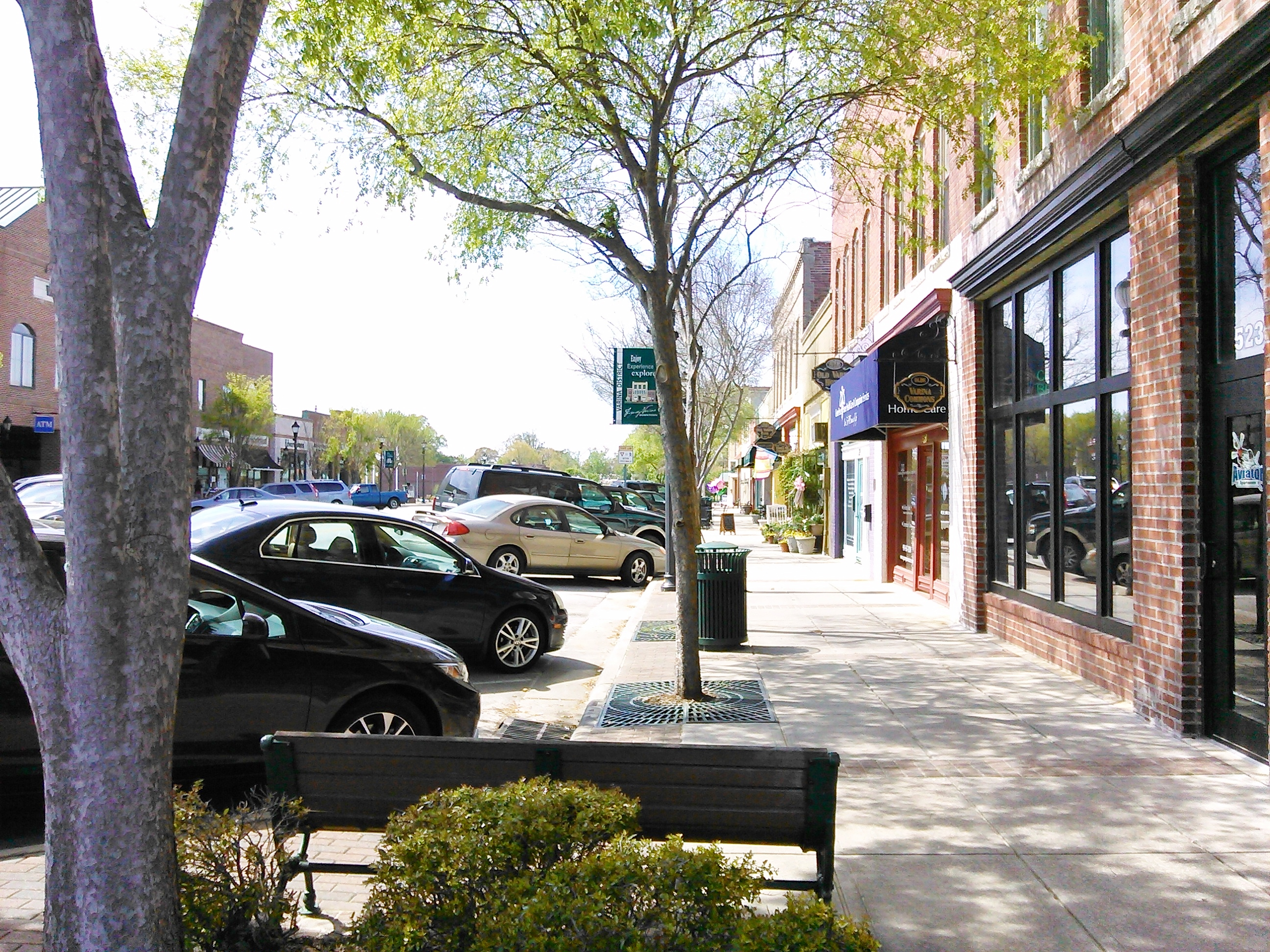
Historic Downtown District In Fuquay-Varina

While development in the area today includes numerous residential communities and commercial sites along the major roadways into town, many of the older structures from its past remain within the town limits. The Victorian, Craftsman, and Colonial Revival homes constructed in the late 19th century and early 20th century are contributing structures to the Fuquay Springs Historic District, while the downtown shops and businesses are part of the Varina Commercial Historic District. Area landmarks located in these districts include the Ben-Wiley Hotel, the Ballentine-Spence House, and the Dr. Wiley S. Cozart House, built across the street from the springs by the original owner and proprietor of the Ben Wiley. The springs are now contained in a small park developed on the site in 1945 which was handed over to the town in 1998 to maintain as a historic park. Lexie McLean owned and operated McLean's Grocery on Academy Street for many years. McLean was a community leader and considered a major factor in the growth and development of the Fuquay-Varina area. Edward N. Farnell was the principal of the Fuquay Spring High School from 1952 through 1967. Farnell was an important community leader and educator; many of his students went on to become community and state leaders.

From 1970 to 2000, the population more than doubled, growing from 3,576 residents to 7,898. The population more than doubled again between 2000 and 2010, growing to 17,937 at the 2010 census. According to the NC State Data Center, Fuquay-Varina grew 23% from 2000 to 2003, making it the 26th fastest growing community in the state and the 11th fastest for those with populations over 5,000.

Fuquay-Varina is also the former hometown of Internet personalities Rhett McLaughlin and Link Neal, who moved their studio there in 2010, as well as Link who until then lived in Apex, North Carolina.

In addition to the Ben-Wiley Hotel, Fuquay Springs Historic District, and Varina Commercial Historic District, the Fuquay Mineral Spring, Fuquay Springs High School, Fuquay Springs Teacherage, Fuquay-Varina Woman's Club Clubhouse, J. Beale Johnson House, Kemp B. Johnson House, Jones-Johnson-Ballentine Historic District, and Wayland H. and Mamie Burt Stevens House are listed on the National Register of Historic Places.

== Geography ==
According to the United States Census Bureau, the town has a total area of 12.2 square miles (31.5 km^{2}), of which 12.1 square miles (31.3 km^{2}) is land and 0.08 square miles (0.2 km^{2}), or 0.51%, is water.

Fuquay-Varina is located in the northeast central region of North Carolina, where the North American Piedmont and Atlantic Coastal Plain regions meet. This area is known as the "Fall Line" because it marks the elevation inland at which waterfalls begin to appear in creeks and rivers. Its central Piedmont location situates Fuquay-Varina approximately three hours west of Atlantic Beach by car and four hours east of the Great Smoky Mountains.

=== Climate ===
Fuquay-Varina enjoys a moderate subtropical climate, with moderate temperatures in the spring, fall, and winter. Summers are typically hot with high humidity. Winter highs generally range in the low 50s °F (10 to 13 °C) with lows in the low-to-mid 30s °F (−2 to 2 °C), although an occasional 60 °F (15 °C) or warmer winter day may occur. Spring and fall days usually reach the low-to-mid 70s °F (low 20s °C), with lows at night in the lower 50s °F (10 to 14 °C). Summer daytime highs often reach the upper 80s to low 90s °F (29 to 35 °C). The rainiest month is July.

== Demographics ==
Historical population
Census	Pop.	Note	%±
1910	127		—
1920	555		337.0%
1930	963		73.5%
1940	1,323		37.4%
1950	1,992		50.6%
1960	3,389		70.1%
1970	3,576		5.5%
1980	3,110		−13.0%
1990	4,562		46.7%
2000	7,898		73.1%
2010	17,937		127.1%
2020	34,152		90.4%
2025 (est.)	48,536	▲	42.1%
U.S. Decennial Census

=== 2020 census ===
As of the 2020 census, Fuquay-Varina had a population of 34,152. The median age was 36.5 years. 27.9% of residents were under the age of 18 and 14.5% were 65 years of age or older. For every 100 females, there were 91.2 males, and for every 100 females age 18 and over, there were 86.5 males.

99.4% of residents lived in urban areas, while 0.6% lived in rural areas.

There were 12,246 households in Fuquay-Varina, including 7,150 families. Of all households, 42.4% had children under the age of 18 living in them, 60.6% were married-couple households, 10.7% were households with a male householder and no spouse or partner present, and 23.4% were households with a female householder and no spouse or partner present. About 19.1% of all households were made up of individuals, and 8.1% had someone living alone who was 65 years of age or older.

There were 13,204 housing units, of which 7.3% were vacant. The homeowner vacancy rate was 3.1% and the rental vacancy rate was 10.1%.

Fuquay-Varina racial composition
Race	Number	Percentage
White (non-Hispanic)	23,542	68.93%
Black or African American (non-Hispanic)	4,700	13.76%
Native American	104	0.3%
Asian	828	2.42%
Pacific Islander	19	0.06%
Other/Mixed	1,761	5.16%
Hispanic or Latino	3,198	9.36%

=== 2000 census ===
As of the census of 2000, there were 7,898 people, 3,122 households, and 2,126 families residing in the town. The population density was 1,156.0 inhabitants per square mile (446.3/km^{2}). There were 3,375 housing units at an average density of 494.0 per square mile (190.7/km^{2}). The racial composition of the town was: 70.63% White, 24.40% Black or African American, 7.38% Hispanic or Latino American, 0.48% Asian American, 0.41% Native American, 0.02% Native Hawaiian or Other Pacific Islander, 2.94% some other race, and 1.15% two or more races.

There were 3,122 households, out of which 36.8% had children under the age of 18 living with them, 48.8% were married couples living together, 15.5% had a female householder with no husband present, and 31.9% were non-families. 26.3% of all households were made up of individuals, and 10.8% had someone living alone who was 65 years of age or older. The average household size was 2.48 and the average family size was 2.99.

In the town, the population was spread out, with 27.3% under the age of 18, 8.2% from 18 to 24, 35.2% from 25 to 44, 16.3% from 45 to 64, and 13.0% who were 65 years of age or older. The median age was 33 years. For every 100 females, there were 89.0 males. For every 100 females age 18 and over, there were 84.5 males.

The median income for a household in the town was $42,903, and the median income for a family was $49,531. Males had a median income of $35,497 versus $28,551 for females. The per capita income for the town was $20,268. About 9.0% of families and 11.1% of the population were below the poverty line, including 15.3% of those under age 18 and 11.5% of those age 65 or over.

== Parks and recreation ==
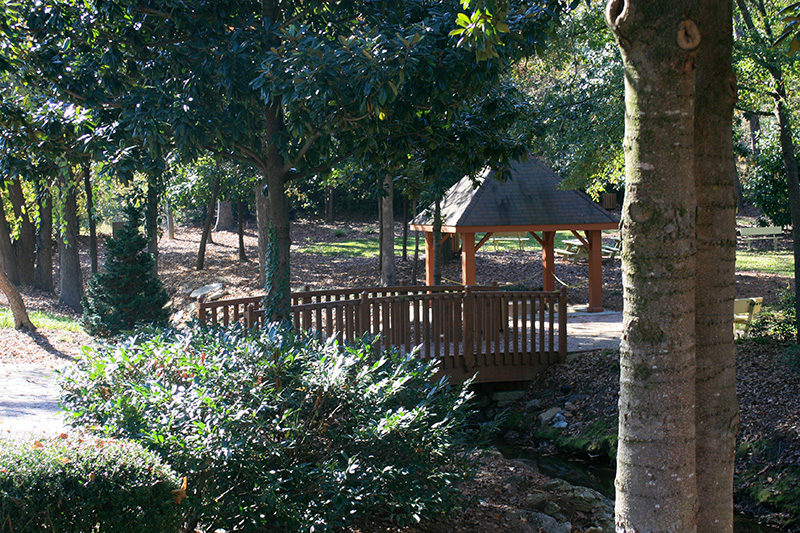
Fuquay Mineral Spring Park

The town features 17 parks located on over 300 acres (120 ha) of land.

== Government ==
Fuquay-Varina is governed by a council-manager form of government. The current mayor is William "Bill" Harris while the town manager is Adam Mitchell. The Town Board serves as the main legislative body, whose members, called commissioners, are all elected at-large for staggered four-year terms, with one member serving as mayor pro ten for a two-year term. The mayor is elected at-large for a two-year term, and serves as chairman of the board. The mayor and commissioners are elected on a nonpartisan basis.

== Education ==
The town is served by eight public schools, administered by the Wake County Public School System. Public schools include Ballentine Elementary School, Fuquay-Varina Elementary School, Lincoln Heights Elementary School, Herbert Akins Road Elementary, Fuquay-Varina Middle School, Fuquay-Varina High School, Willow Spring High School, South Lakes Elementary School, and the upcoming Hilltop Needmore Elementary School. There are multiple charter schools located in Fuquay-Varina, including Southern Wake Academy, a publicly funded charter school serving grades 6 through 12, is also located in Fuquay-Varina. Hilltop Christian School is a private school located in the town.

The area is served by Wake Technical Community College, located between Fuquay-Varina and Raleigh. The enrollment was approximately 64,000 as of 2024.

== Infrastructure ==
=== Transportation ===
==== Roads ====
Two state routes and one U.S. route run through Fuquay Varina. All three routes occupy part of Main Street in the main business district in town, and each goes in a different direction outside of the main business district.

- NC 42 enters the town from the west, after traveling through a large sparsely populated rural area including the unincorporated community of Duncan. The next sizable settlement on NC 42 is Sanford, about 25 miles away. After entering the town, it follows Academy Street, which marks the central east–west street of the town grid system. After meeting Main Street, NC 42 leaves Academy Street and joins US 401 along North Main Street. After meeting NC 55 at Broad Street just south of Old Varina, the three share North Main Street before NC 55 and NC 42 leave US 401 at the northeastern corner of town. The two routes share pavement only for a few dozen yards before NC 42 splits off in an eastbound direction towards Willow Springs and Cleveland in Johnston County.
- NC 55 enters the town from the northwest, entering the town from Holly Springs and forming the main route through the Varina Commercial Historic District, one of the former towns that merged to make Fuquay-Varina. After meeting the other two routes, the three share North Main Street before NC 55 and NC 42 leave US 401 at the northeastern corner of town. The two routes share pavement only for a few dozen yards before NC 55 splits to the south and heads towards the unincorporated community of Kennebec and from then on to Angier.
- US 401 enters the town from the south, after traveling through northern Harnett County from Lillington. Forming the main thoroughfare through the Fuquay Springs Historic District, one of the former towns that merged to make Fuquay Varina, following South Main Street. After meeting NC 42 at Academy Street and NC 55, the three routes follow North Main Street through town before NC 42 and NC 55 leave towards the southeast, and US 401 heads northeast towards Garner.

==== Public transport ====
- Air: Raleigh-Durham International Airport is located in northwestern Wake county on I-40.
- Rail: Fuquay-Varina is not served directly by passenger trains. Amtrak serves the nearby municipalities of Cary and Raleigh.
- Local bus: The Triangle Transit Authority operates buses that serve the region and connect to municipal bus systems in Raleigh, Durham, and Chapel Hill.

== Notable people ==
- Lynton Y. Ballentine, North Carolina dairyman, farmer and politician
- Andre Bowden, Arena Football League fullback and linebacker
- Curley Bridges (1934–2014), was an American electric blues, rock and roll, and rhythm and blues singer, pianist and songwriter
- Beverly Buchanan, African-American artist whose works include painting, sculpture, video, and land art
- Conor Donovan, professional soccer player
- Franklin Taylor Dupree Jr., Federal judge who lived in Fuquay-Varina while he presided over the Jeffrey MacDonald murder trial
- Count Grog, professional wrestling manager and promoter
- C.J. Hunter, US Olympic shot putter
- Rhett and Link, Internetainers (a portmanteau of the words "Internet" and "entertainers") who host Good Mythical Morning
- Katharine Stinson, aeronautical engineer and the Federal Aviation Administration's first female engineer
