= Willow Spring High School =

Public high school in Fuquay-Varina, North Carolina

Location
- 1704 Old Honeycutt Rd; Fuquay-Varina, North Carolina 27526; United States; 35°34′30″N 78°44′14″W

Information
- Type: Public
- Established: 2021 (5 years ago)
- School district: Wake County Public School System
- NCES District ID: 3704720
- CEEB code: 340157
- NCES School ID: 370472003570
- Principal: Wade Martin
- Teaching staff: 107.50 (on an FTE basis)
- Grades: 9–12
- Gender: Coeducational
- Enrollment: 2,056 (2023–2024)
- Student to teacher ratio: 19.13
- Campus size: 58.50 acres (23.67 ha)
- Campus type: Rural
- Colors: Navy blue, Sky blue, and Yellow
- Athletics: NCHSAA 8A
- Athletics conference: Quad City Seven 8A
- Mascot: The Storm
- Website: Willow Spring High School

Willow Spring High School (WSHS) is a public high school located in Fuquay-Varina, North Carolina. The school began construction in 2017 to accommodate the growing population of Wake County, and began operation in 2021. The school has had one of its teachers nominated for a state award in 2023, and since gaining a senior class in 2024, has continued to grow in its student body.

== History ==
Willow Spring is a relatively new high school, built to accommodate the growing population of Wake County in the 2020s. WCPSS Assistant Superintendent and future principal of the school upon opening, Wade Martin, helped propose the idea for a new school, after multiple schools in the area were cited as being "significantly over 100 percent of their capacity".

Engineering plans for the school were drafted by LHC Structural Engineers, and the site plan approved on March 21, 2017. In 2019, construction on the school finished, and the completed buildings would first be used to temporarily house students of Fuquay-Varina High School while their old school was being reconstructed. In December 2020, the school mascot was chosen as the "Storm", and in the 2021–2022 school year, the buildings were officially opened for their intended purpose, housing ~900 freshmen and sophomores in their inaugural class. Due to the COVID-19 pandemic, about 35 students opted to attend via the district's Virtual Academy, while the remaining ~850 students attended in-person in classroom layouts designed with social distancing in mind.

In February 2023, one of four of the school's assistant principals was suspended following a pending driving under the influence charge.

In October 2023, the school's special education teacher received the Educator of Excellence award from the state Department of Public Instruction.

== Extracurricular ==
=== Athletics ===
Willow Spring High School is a member of the North Carolina High School Athletic Association (NCHSAA) and are classified as a 8A school. The school is a part of the Quad City Seven 8A Conference.

The school hosts cheer, cross-country, football, women's golf, men's soccer, women's tennis, and women's volleyball in the fall; basketball, indoor track and field, women's soccer, swimming/diving, and wrestling in the winter; and baseball, men's golf, lacrosse, women's soccer, softball, men's tennis, and outdoor track and field in the spring.

=== Clubs and organizations ===
As of the 2025–26 school year, the hosts 61 clubs and organizations. Of these 61, eleven of which are branches of honor societies, and include the Athlete Honor Society, French National Honor Society (FNHS), International Thespian Society (ITS), Mu Alpha Theta, National English Honor Society (NEHS), National Honor Society (NHS), National Technical Honor Society (NTHS), Psi Alpha, Science National Honor Society (SNHS), Spanish National Honor Society (SNHS), and Tri-M Music Honor Society.

The other 50 non-honor society clubs at WSHS include: AIG Club, Animal Welfare, Architecture and Interior Design Club, Art Club, Astronomy Club, Black Student Union (BSU), Blossom Together, Coding Club, Comic Club, Cornhole Club, Culture Club, Distributive Education Clubs of America (DECA), E-Gaming Club, Environmental Club, Fellowship of Christian Athletes (FCA), Future Farmers of America (FFA), Free Drawing Club, French Club, Future Women in Medicine, Girls Bible Study, Hand to Hunger, Health Occupations Students of America (HOSA), Investors Club, Key Club, Lex Societas, Makers Club, Model UN, Muslim Student Association, National Achievers Society (NAS), Newspaper Club, Pickleball Club, Pride Alliance, Red Cross, Robotics Club, Science Olympiad, Student Government Association (SGA), Spanish Club Latinos Unidos, Speech and Debate Club, Sport Media and Marketing Club, Student Ambassadors, Thrift and Flip, Travis Manion Foundation, UNICEF Club, Vibha Youth Organization, Wellness Club, WSHS Morgan's Message, Willow Hope, Women in STEM, Writing and Literature Club, and Yoga Club.
