= Fuquay-Varina High School =

Public school in North Carolina, United States

Coordinates: 35.5977°N 78.7969°W

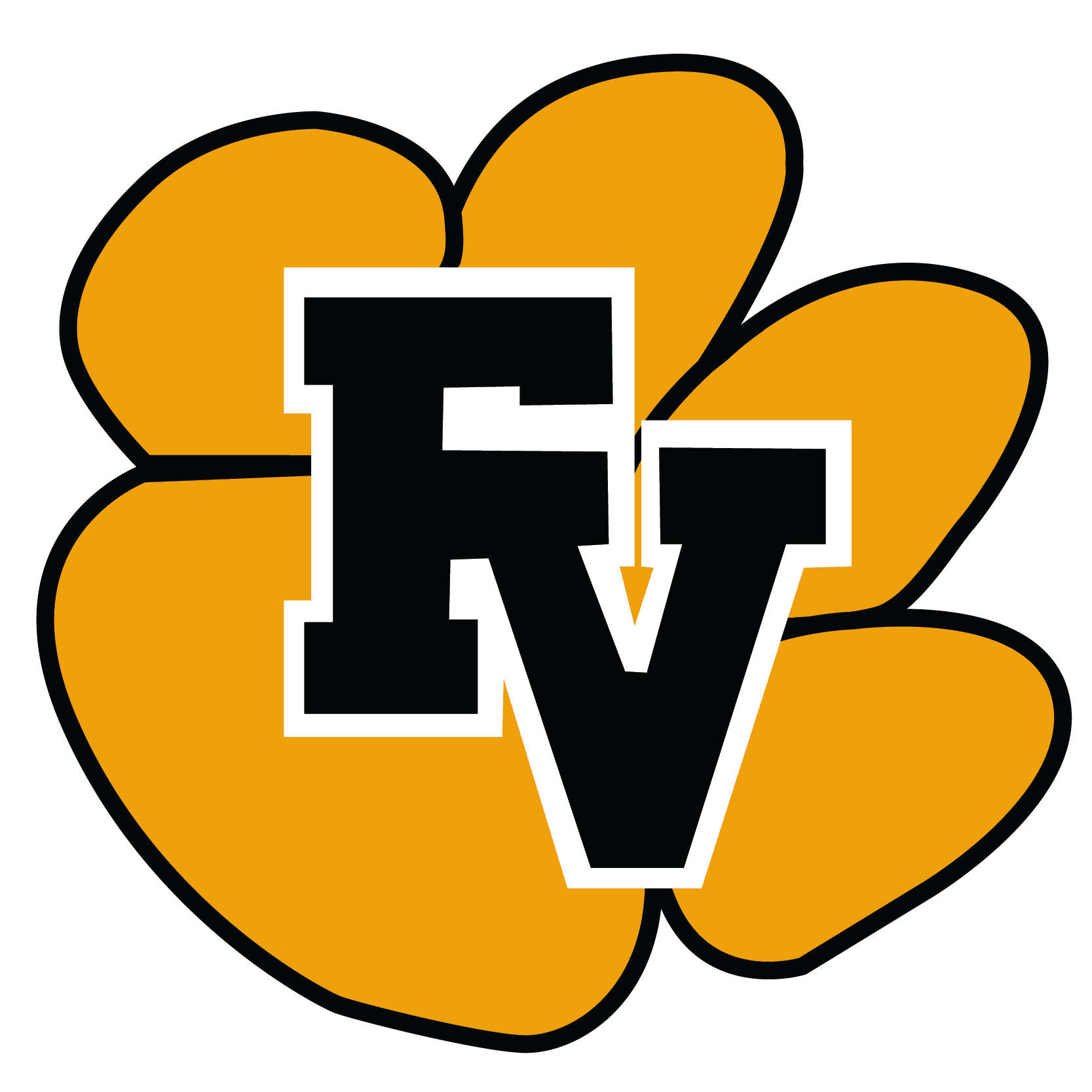
- 201 Bengal Blvd; Fuquay-Varina, North Carolina 27526; United States

Information
- Type: Public
- Motto: Foster student learning where success is the only option.
- Founded: 1925 (101 years ago)
- School district: Wake County Public School System
- CEEB code: 341415
- Principal: Robert James
- Teaching staff: 95.24 (FTE)
- Enrollment: 1,744 (2023–2024)
- Student to teacher ratio: 18.31
- Colors: Orange and black
- Mascot: Bengal
- Website: Fuquay-Varina High School

Fuquay-Varina High School (FVHS) is a public high school in Fuquay-Varina, North Carolina. The current principal is Robert James, who took that position in 2022. FVHS was named a "School of Distinction" in 2003, 2004, and 2005.

== History ==
The present location of Fuquay-Varina High School campus opened in 1975; but the desegregated Fuquay Varina High School was established in 1963 where the school office was located on Woodrow Street.

The former High School campus has been used as Fuquay-Varina Middle School since 1918. Prior to racial integration, the all-white High School at the now Fuquay-Varina Middle School location was called Fuquay Springs High School; the name change to present Fuquay-Varina High School was made at the time of the integration or desegregation planning merger with Fuquay Consolidated High School in accordance with supreme court decision Brown vs. Board of Education in 1954 that made segregation in public schools illegal. Student Council leadership in both Fuquay Consolidated High School and Fuquay Springs High School paved the way for the new proposed high school; it was at this time the current Bengal Tiger mascot and the current school colors Orange, Black, and White were voted on by both student bodies at Fuquay Consolidated High School and Fuquay Springs High School in order to honor their unity as a future desegregated school and memorialise the equality of all students having an equal voice in 1963 establishing Fuquay-Varina High School. The school colors of White-segregated Fuquay Springs High School had been Green and White and the Mascot had been a Falcon, known as the Fuquay Falcons like Falcon Park, Fuquay-Varina, NC; the colors and Mascot for Black-segregated Fuquay Consolidated High School had been Maroon and Gold and the school's mascot had been a Bison, and they were known as the Fuquay Bison's. Community efforts led the Wake County Public School Board to propose a new high school complex in the town at the present site on Bengal Boulevard. In fall 1975, moved grades ten through 12 to the new campus; in 1977, the school added the 9th grade. To honor integration and equality of race in Fuquay-Varina High School students have historically since 1975 nominated from each grade one Black woman and one White woman to Homecoming Court with the exception of the senior class who nominates three Black women and three White women, with only one Queen from the six senior nominations voted on by the entire student body. During the four decades on the current campus, the enrollment of Fuquay-Varina High School has more than doubled, reflecting growth in southern Wake County. Major campus expansion projects were completed in 1993, 2001, 2021.

The rebuilt High School campus was finished in 2021 with classes being moved over the same year, the building where classes were held since 2019 was renamed to Willow Spring High School, the new campus is 364,000 sq ft and meets standards for a student body of 2,262

The recent "School of Distinction" ratings reflect a tradition of achievement. During the 1960s for example, the school music department distinguished itself in State Band Competition, by winning five Superior Ratings; four of which were in the Grade Six (most difficult) music category. The Director was James D. Page. During this period, the school was also distinguished at the state level in dramatic arts and academics.

The school's funding decreased due to the school for the first time in history losing 300 students of the 600 student Freshman class in Fall 2001 - Spring 2002 to the then newly built Middle Creek High School in 2002. In fall 2002 the new school (MCHS) had its first student body ever that only compromised 10th and rising 9th graders; there were no 11th graders at MCHS until 2003 and no 12th graders until 2004 when the original Sophomore class of 2002 became the upperclassmen. Neighborhoods and families in Fuquay-Varina, Holly Springs, Willow Springs, Apex, and Cary were divided in fall 2002 because of the new school MCHS's districting lines in Wake County to district students between the newer school, MCHS, and the historically older school, FVHS, in Southern Wake County. In some instances, siblings in the same household would attend and be zoned to different schools, either FVHS or MCHS despite their proximity to either school. During this time of school redistricting, FVHS had 5 different principals between the years 2001–2006.

== Athletics ==
Fuquay-Varina High School is a member of the North Carolina High School Athletic Association, and competes at the 7A level based on enrollment. The athletic teams, nicknamed the "Bengals" (short for Bengal Tigers) wear orange, white, and black.

Traditional rivals include Clayton High School, Harnett Central High School, Apex High School, and Cary High School, while newer rivalries with Middle Creek High School (which opened in 2002), Holly Springs High School (which opened in 2007), and Willow Spring High School (which opened in 2021) have become more important in recent years. FVHS competes in the Greater Neuse River 7A conference (GNRC).

The 1985 Bengal football team played in the 2A state championship game. The FVHS team held the record for the most combined points scored in a North Carolina High School football game with their 83–56 victory over future NFL quarterback David Garrard's Southern Durham team. The men's basketball team won the 1993 Conference Tourney Championship, the school's only conference tournament title. The baseball team won the 2002 state 4A championship and 2018 state 4A championship. Other FVHS athletic teams that have won state titles in the last 27 years include the men's golf team (3A, in 1997), women's soccer team (4A in 2018), women's cross-country team (3A, in 1996), and the wrestling team (3A, in 2000 and 2001).

The "Orange Crush", the name of the school's student section, was one of the first of its kind in the area. The idea was to start a student section at the games to create an exciting atmosphere. That season the FVHS Varsity basketball team went undefeated at home while winning just one away game. The original shirts were all printed on campus in a screen-printing class and distributed to classmates. At the time, students were encouraged to put their graduating class on the back of the shirt as well as a last name or nickname.

== Notable alumni ==
- Clara Leach Adams-Ender — retired US Army officer, served as chief of the United States Army Nurse Corps
- Sarah Strong — college basketball player
