= Fuquay-Varina Woman's Club Clubhouse =

Historic clubhouse in Fuquay-Varina, North Carolina, U.S.

- U.S. National Register of Historic Places
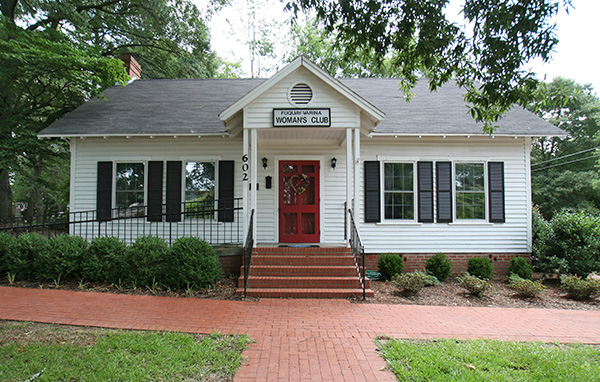
- Fuquay-Varina Woman's Club Clubhouse, July 2008

- Location within North Carolina Location within the United States
- Location: 602 N. Ennis St., Fuquay-Varina, North Carolina
- Coordinates: 35°35′32″N 78°47′35″W
- Area: 0.2 acres (0.081 ha)
- Built: 1937
- Architectural style: Bungalow/craftsman
- NRHP reference No.: 07000352
- Added to NRHP: April 24, 2007

Fuquay-Varina Woman's Club Clubhouse is a historic Woman's Club clubhouse located at Fuquay-Varina, Wake County, North Carolina. It was built in 1937, and is a one-story, T-shaped, Bungalow / American Craftsman influenced frame building. The building consists of a rectangular meeting room measuring 24 feet by 40 feet, and a 14 feet by 24 feet rear ell containing the kitchen, a small pantry and a bathroom.

It was listed on the National Register of Historic Places in 2007.
