= Varina Commercial Historic District =

Historic district in North Carolina, United States

- U.S. National Register of Historic Places
- U.S. Historic district
- Location within North Carolina Location within the United States
- Location: Broad and Fayetteville Sts. between Stewart St. and Ransdell Rd., Fuquay-Varina, North Carolina
- Coordinates: 35°35′34″N 78°47′40″W
- Area: 4 acres (1.6 ha)
- Built: 1899
- Architect: Hairr, A.Y.
- NRHP reference No.: 89002351
- Added to NRHP: January 31, 1990

Varina Commercial Historic District is a national historic district located at Fuquay-Varina, Wake County, North Carolina. The district encompasses 12 contributing buildings in the central business district of Fuquay-Varina. The district developed between about 1899 and 1926, and includes notable examples of early-20th century commercial architecture. Notable buildings include the Union Station (c. 1910), Varina Hotel (c. 1925), Bank of Varina (c. 1914), Varina Garage and Machine Company Building (c. 1918), Drug Store (c. 1917), and Bank of Varina (1926).

It was listed on the National Register of Historic Places in 1990.
