= J. Beale Johnson House =

Historic house in North Carolina, United States

- U.S. National Register of Historic Places
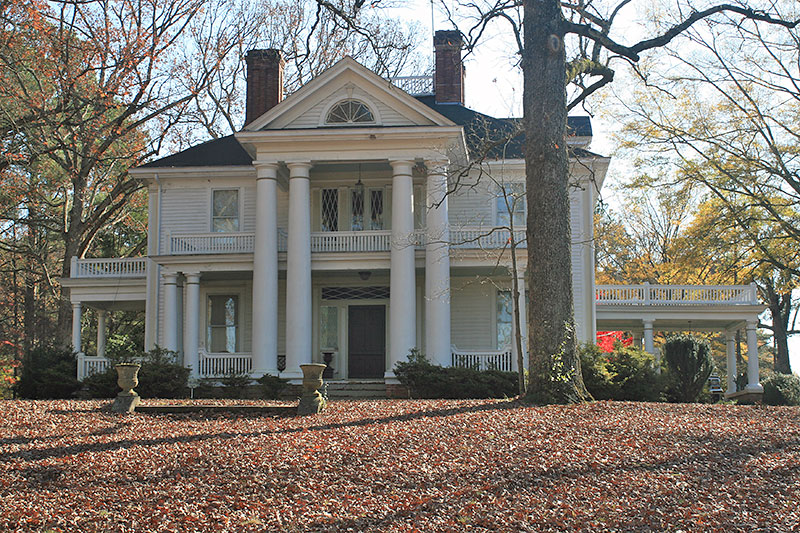
- J. Beale Johnson House, November 2009

- Location within North Carolina Location within the United States
- Location: 6321 Johnson Pond Rd., near Fuquay-Varina, North Carolina
- Coordinates: 35°36′40″N 78°45′21″W
- Area: 13.9 acres (5.6 ha)
- Built: c. 1906
- Architect: Pearson, Charles
- Architectural style: Classical Revival
- NRHP reference No.: 91001375
- Added to NRHP: September 5, 1991

J. Beale Johnson House is a historic home located near Fuquay-Varina, Wake County, North Carolina. The house was built about 1906, and is a two-story, double pile, Classical Revival style frame dwelling. It is sheathed in weatherboard, sits on a brick foundation, hipped roof, and rear ell. It features a two-story pedimented front portico supported by Doric order columns and one-story wraparound porch with porte cochere.

It was listed on the National Register of Historic Places in 1991.
