= Jones–Johnson–Ballentine Historic District =

Historic farm in North Carolina, United States

- U.S. National Register of Historic Places
- U.S. Historic district
- Location within North Carolina Location within the United States
- Location: SR 1301-522 Sunset Rd., near Fuquay-Varina, North Carolina
- Coordinates: 35°36′36″N 78°46′21″W
- Area: 338 acres (137 ha)
- Built: 1905
- Architectural style: Classical Revival, Late Victorian, Vernacular Victorian
- NRHP reference No.: 89002352
- Added to NRHP: January 26, 1990

Jones–Johnson–Ballentine Historic District is a national historic district located near Fuquay-Varina, Wake County, North Carolina. The district encompasses 18 contributing buildings, 3 contributing sites, and 8 contributing structures on the Johnson Farm and the Ballentine Farm near Fuquay-Varina. The district includes notable examples of Classical Revival and Victorian style architecture. Notable resources include the William Wesley Johnson House (c. 1860, 1905), The Log Cabin (c. 1780, 1935), James E. Ballentine House (1890), The Creamery (c. 1890), Dairy Barn (1915), a family cemetery and the surrounding farm landscape.

It was listed on the National Register of Historic Places in 1990.
