= Margaret Ann Jones =

American philanthropist and businesswoman (1937–2019)

- Born: November 5, 1937; Willow Spring, North Carolina
- Died: June 27, 2019 (aged 81); North Carolina
- Other names: Margaret A. Jones, Margaret Jones, Mema
- Occupations: Philanthropist, Businesswoman

Margaret Ann Jones (November 5, 1937 – June 27, 2019) was an American philanthropist and businesswoman. She was a founding member of Guam Memorial Hospital Volunteers Association (GMHVA) and a treasurer of Triple J Enterprises in Guam.

== Biography ==
On November 5, 1937, Jones was born in Willow Spring, North Carolina. Jones' parents were Early and Verna Page.

In 1965, Jones became a founding member of Guam Memorial Hospital Volunteers Association (GMHVA), a non-profit organization known as the Pink Ladies, in Guam. As of 2015, GMHVA had already raised over $8 million for improvements to Guam’s only public hospital.

In 1968, Jones started her work career at the Marianas Travel Agency, the first travel agency in Guam. In 1973, Jones worked in inventory and buying with Eileen Kershaw, Inc, a Guam fine jewelry and gift shop owned by Carolyn "Elaine" Faria and her Faria family, in Guam.

In 1975, Jones became a special sales representative for Pan American Airlines, until it was sold in 1991. In 1984, Jones became a co-founder and treasurer of Triple J Enterprises in Guam. Jones handled buying, advertising and public relations. By 2005, Triple J Enterprises was the fourth largest business in Micronesia.

Jones was involved with American Cancer Society. Jones was also involved with fundraising for cancer research and prevention.

== Awards ==
2018 Lifetime Achievement Award. Presented by First Hawaiian Bank and Guam Business Magazine.

== Personal life ==
In the 1960s, Jones moved from Raleigh, North Carolina to Guam.

Jones' husband was Robert H. Jones, who became the CEO and chairman of Triple J Enterprises Inc in Guam. They had three children.

Jones' son Jeffery Jones became the president and chief operating officer of Triple J Enterprises. Jones' son Jay Jones became senior vice president of Triple J Enterprises with a focus on automotive operations. Jones' daughter Julie Jones Murrell became a professional counselor.

Jones was a cancer survivor.

On June 27, 2019, Jones died in North Carolina.

=== Legacy ===
In 2020, the Jones family donated $31.5k to GMH Volunteers in Jones' memory.
