= Kemp B. Johnson House =

Historic house in North Carolina, United States

- U.S. National Register of Historic Places
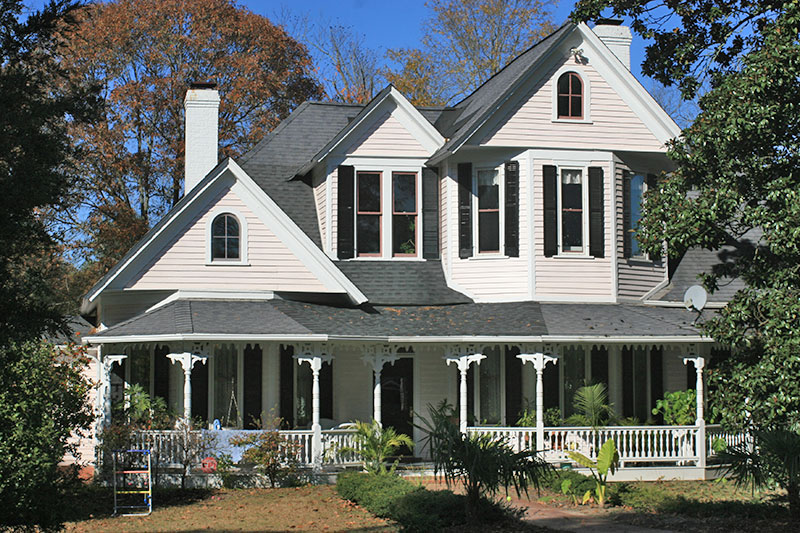
- Kemp B. Johnson House

- Location within North Carolina Location within the United States
- Location: 7116 Johnson Pond Rd., near Fuquay-Varina, North Carolina
- Coordinates: 35°35′58″N 78°45′49″W
- Area: 2.3 acres (0.93 ha)
- Built: c. 1896, c. 1905
- Architectural style: Queen Anne
- NRHP reference No.: 05001028
- Added to NRHP: September 15, 2005

Kemp B. Johnson House is a historic home located near Fuquay-Varina, Wake County, North Carolina. The house was built about 1896, and is a 1 1/2-story, double pile, Queen Anne style frame dwelling. It has a high hipped roof and full-width front porch with intricate sawnwork decoration. A one-story, side-gable, three-bay wing was added about 1905.

It was listed on the National Register of Historic Places in 2005.
