= Wayland H. and Mamie Burt Stevens House =

Historic house in North Carolina, United States

- U.S. National Register of Historic Places
- Location within North Carolina Location within the United States
- Location: 408 N. Ennis St., Fuquay-Varina, North Carolina
- Coordinates: 35°35′22″N 78°47′33″W
- Area: 3.2 acres (1.3 ha)
- Built: 1936
- Built by: Hairr, A. Y.
- Architectural style: Colonial Revival
- MPS: Historic and Architectural Resources of Wake County, North Carolina
- NRHP reference No.: 14001023
- Added to NRHP: December 10, 2014

Wayland H. and Mamie Burt Stevens House is a historic home located at Fuquay-Varina, Wake County, North Carolina. The house was built in 1936, and is a two-story, Colonial Revival-style brick dwelling with a hipped roof. It features an entry portico and a front door with fanlight and sidelights. Also on the property are the contributing garage (1936) and tool shed (1936).

It was listed on the National Register of Historic Places in 2014.
