= Turner and Amelia Smith House =

Historic house in North Carolina, United States

- U.S. National Register of Historic Places
- Location within North Carolina Location within the United States
- Location: 12244 Old Stage Rd., Willow Spring, North Carolina
- Coordinates: 35°34′44″N 78°41′38″W
- Area: 1.9 acres (0.77 ha)
- Built: c. 1880
- Architectural style: Italianate
- MPS: Wake County MPS
- NRHP reference No.: 05000549
- Added to NRHP: June 10, 2005

The Turner and Amelia Smith House is a historic home in Willow Spring, Wake County, North Carolina, a suburb of Raleigh. The house was built about 1880, and is a two-story, three-bay, single-pile frame I-house with a central hall plan. It is sheathed in weatherboard, has a triple-A-roof, and a tall shed addition and hip-roofed front porch.

It was listed on the National Register of Historic Places in July 2005.

== See also ==
- List of Registered Historic Places in North Carolina
