= Frank and Mary Smith House =

Historic house in North Carolina, United States

- U.S. National Register of Historic Places
- Location within North Carolina Location within the United States
- Location: 2935 John Adams Rd., Willow Spring, North Carolina
- Coordinates: 35°34′34″N 78°41′07″W
- Area: 16 acres (6.5 ha)
- Built: 1880
- Architectural style: I House
- MPS: Wake County MPS
- NRHP reference No.: 03000931
- Added to NRHP: September 11, 2003

The Frank and Mary Smith House is a historic home located at 2935 John Adams Road in Willow Spring, Wake County, North Carolina, a suburb of Raleigh. The house was built about 1880, and is a two-story, three-bay, single-pile frame I-house with a central hall plan. It is sheathed in weatherboard, has a triple-A-roof, and a 1 1/2-story tall shed addition and gabled rear ell.

It was listed on the National Register of Historic Places in September 2003.

== See also ==
- List of Registered Historic Places in North Carolina
