= Clara Adams-Ender =

United States Army officer (born 1939)

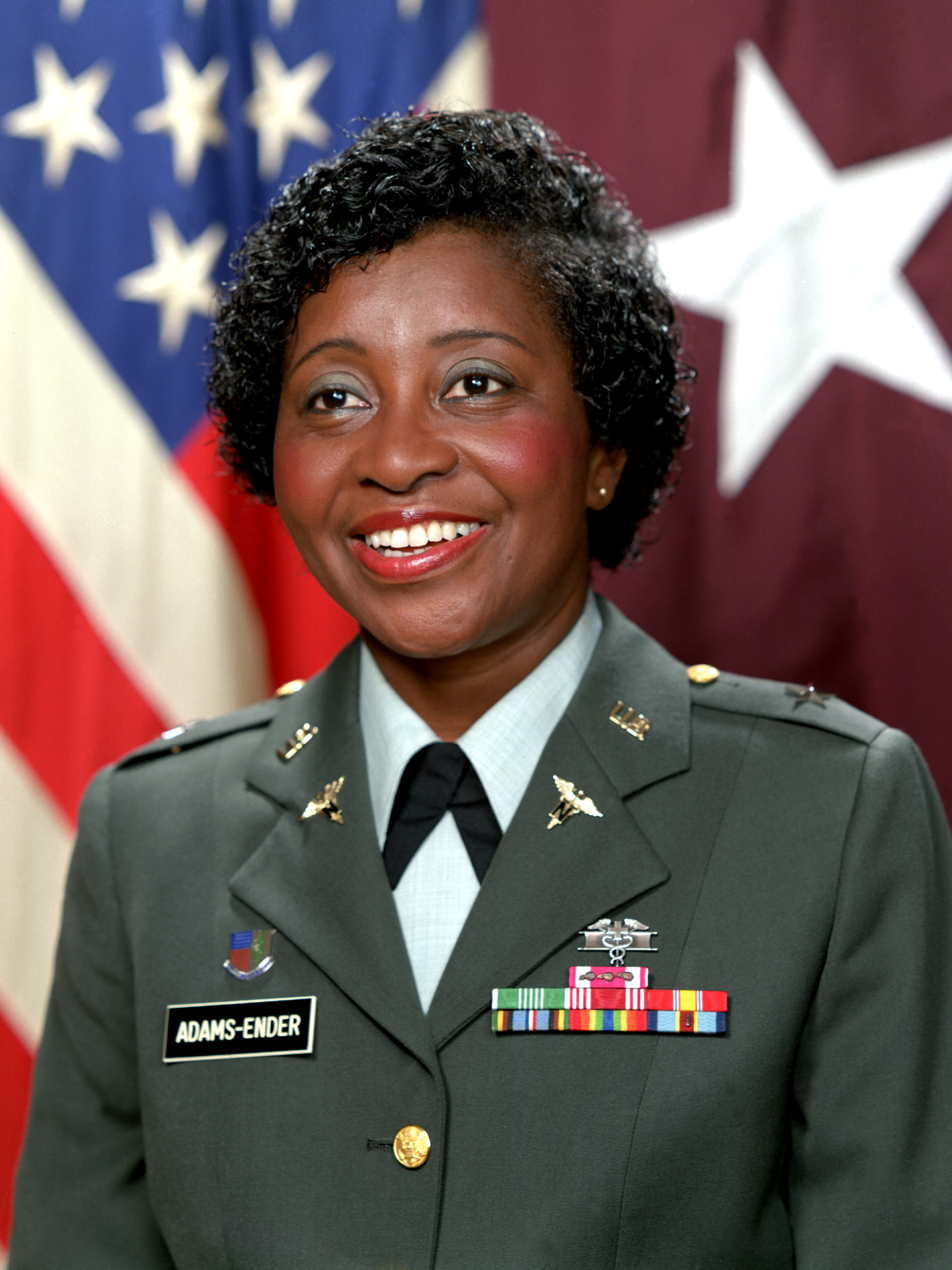
- Brigadier General Clara Adams-Ender
- Born: Clara Leach; July 11, 1939 (age 87); Willow Spring, North Carolina, U.S.
- Military career
- Allegiance: United States
- Branch: United States Army
- Service years: 1961–1993
- Rank: Brigadier General
- Commands: Fort Belvoir; United States Army Nurse Corps
- Awards: Army Distinguished Service Medal (2); Legion of Merit; Meritorious Service Medal (4); Army Commendation Medal
- Other work: Management consultant

Clara Adams-Ender (née Leach; born July 11, 1939) is a retired United States Army officer who served as Chief of the United States Army Nurse Corps from September 1987 to August 1991. She was the first woman to receive her master's degree in military arts and sciences from the United States Army Command and General Staff College. She is also the first African-American nurse corps officer to graduate from the United States Army War College. When she retired, in 1993, she was serving as commanding officer of Fort Belvoir, in Fairfax County, Virginia. After retirement, in 2001 she published a memoir, My Rise to the Stars: How a Sharecropper's Daughter Became an Army General.

== Early life and education ==
Clara Leach was born in Willow Spring, North Carolina, on July 11, 1939. She had nine siblings. Her mother was Caretha Bell (Sapp) Leach. Her father, Otha Leach, was a sharecropper and the family lived in Wake County, North Carolina, on a tobacco farm. Leach attended high school at Fuquay Springs Consolidated High School and graduated when she was sixteen, as second in her class. She attended North Carolina A&T State University, a historically black university. While there, she was a participant in the Greensboro sit-ins.

Leach joined the United States Army in order to pay for her nursing school education. When she graduated, in 1961, she was commissioned a second lieutenant in the United States Army Nurse Corps.

== Military career ==
After graduation Leach worked at Brooke Army Medical Center. In 1961 she became staff nurse at the hospital at Fort Dix. While there, she also participated in an intensive care program at Fitzsimons Army Medical Center. In 1963, she left her position at Fort Dix to work at the 121st Evacuation Hospital in South Korea. She attended classes at Fort Sam Houston and later became an instructor there. She was at Fort Sam from 1964 until 1967. After 1967, she returned to graduate school, earning a master's degree in medical-surgical nursing from the University of Minnesota's School of Nursing. She married James Adams during this time; they divorced five years later and she kept her married name.

Adams taught at Walter Reed Army Medical Center starting in 1969. She became the Director of Nursing at Fort George G. Meade in 1974. The following year she attended the United States Army Command and General Staff College, graduating in 1976. She was the first woman to graduate from the college with a degree in military arts and sciences.

In 1978 she was posted to Frankfurt, Germany, where she started as assistant chief at the Department of Nursing at the 97th General Hospital. She had advanced to chief when she left the hospital in 1981. She was promoted to colonel that year. Also in 1981, she married Heinz Ender. Completing her tour in Germany, she returned to the United States.

Known from her marriage as Adams-Ender, she conducted extensive nursing recruitment to the Army. She relocated to Fort Sheridan and headed the nurse recruitment program there, while attending the United States Army War College. She graduated in 1982, the first African American nurse corps student to graduate from the college. She left Fort Sheridan in 1984. Aside from recruitment, she also was active in seeking increased wages for nurses.

In 1991, Adams-Ender was selected as Commanding General, Fort Belvoir, Virginia, and served in this capacity as well as that of Deputy Commanding General of the United States Military District of Washington until her retirement in 1993.

== After retirement ==
Adams-Ender retired from the army in 1993 and started a consulting company. She is the former president of Caring About People With Enthusiasm. In 2001 she published a memoir: My Rise to the Stars: How a Sharecropper's Daughter Became an Army General.

== Personal life ==
Adams-Ender is a Catholic convert.

In the 2024 United States presidential election, Adams-Ender endorsed Kamala Harris.

== Honors ==
In 1996, she was named one of Working Woman magazine's 350 women who "changed the world." She is a recipient of the Army Distinguished Service Medal with one oak leaf cluster, Legion of Merit, Meritorious Service Medal with three oak leaf clusters, and an Army Commendation Medal.

Adams-Ender also received the Roy Wilkins Meritorious Service Award and the Gertrude E. Rush Award for Leadership. In 2019, she was inducted as a member of the United States Army Women's Hall of Fame.

Adams-Ender is a member of Delta Sigma Theta sorority.
