= Fuquay Mineral Spring =

- U.S. National Register of Historic Places
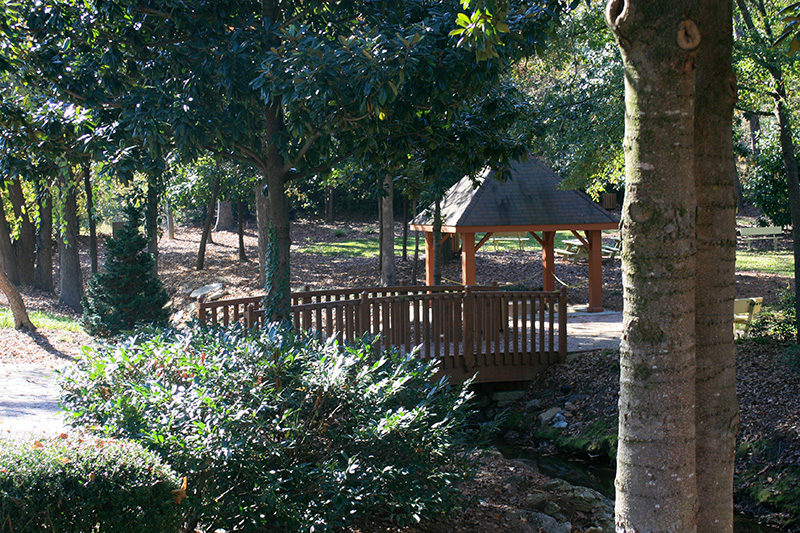
- Fuquay Mineral Springs Park, November 2009

- Location within North Carolina Location within the United States
- Location: NE corner of Main and W. Spring Sts., Fuquay-Varina, North Carolina
- Coordinates: 35°34′48″N 78°48′3″W
- Area: 1.2 acres (0.49 ha)
- Built: c. 1900
- NRHP reference No.: 86003457
- Added to NRHP: December 4, 1986

Fuquay Mineral Spring is a historic mineral spring located at Fuquay-Varina, Wake County, North Carolina. The spring was discovered in the 1850s, and, from 1900 to 1930, thousands of people visited the spring to drink the mineral water reputed to cure kidney and intestinal ailments. The spring is covered by a gazebo and reached by a small footbridge.

It was listed on the National Register of Historic Places in 1986.
