= Willow Spring, North Carolina =

Unincorporated community in North Carolina, US

Coordinates: 35°35′45″N 78°43′53″W

Willow Spring is an unincorporated community in southeastern Wake, and western Johnston counties, North Carolina, United States, which is covered by a shared post office. As of 2014, the population was 15,768. The Frank and Mary Smith House and Turner and Amelia Smith House, both listed on the National Register of Historic Places, are located in Willow Spring. Black Creek, part of the Neuse River, runs through Willow Spring. There are wetlands such as swamp and marsh surrounding the creek. Willow Spring is between Garner and Fuquay- Varina.

== Climate ==
Willow Spring has a humid subtropical climate. Summertime average temperatures range between 90 and 97 degrees, sometimes rising into the 100s. Average wintertime temperatures range between 55 and 65 degrees, sometimes rising into the mid-80s.

== Demographics ==
There are five people per square mile (population density). The median age is 33.8, while the US median is 37.6. A total of 65.75% of people in Willow Spring (27592) are married, while 7.95% are divorced.

The average household size is 2.7 people. A total of 34.73% of people are married, with children; 6.77% have children.

The previous entry referred to "Willow Spring" in Wake County, not "Willow Springs" in Johnston County.

== Notable people ==
- Clara Leach Adams-Ender, retired US Army officer who was Chief of the United States Army Nurse Corps from September 1987 to August 1991
- Margaret Ann Jones - American philanthropist and businesswoman.
- Nolan McLean, Baseball pitcher for the New York Mets.
