= Fuquay Springs High School =

Historic school building in North Carolina, United States

- U.S. National Register of Historic Places
- Location within North Carolina Location within the United States
- Location: 112 N. Ennis St., Fuquay-Varina, North Carolina
- Coordinates: 35°35′12″N 78°47′38″W
- Area: less than one acre
- Built: 1925
- Architectural style: Colonial Revival
- MPS: Wake County MPS
- NRHP reference No.: 02000495
- Added to NRHP: May 16, 2002

Fuquay Springs High School, also known as Fuquay-Varina Middle School, is a historic high school located at Fuquay-Varina, Wake County, North Carolina. It was built about 1925, and is a two-story, rectangular, flat-roofed, red brick, Colonial Revival style building. It has a one-story rear auditorium wing. The school was connected by an open breezeway to a cafeteria building built about 1948. In the early 2000s the campus underwent a renovation and addition by the Wake County Public School System which consisted in converting the existing 1925 building into an administration hall along with a few classrooms. The 1948 construction was demolished along with a few other buildings. The renovation took place to address the issue of students having to go outside to switch classes, so the buildings on the north end of the campus with the exception of the gym was demolished. The new construction ties the rest of the buildings from the north end of the campus to the south end opening in 2003.

The 1925 building was listed on the National Register of Historic Places in 2002.
