= Beta Pi Theta =

American honor society for French

- ΒΠΘ
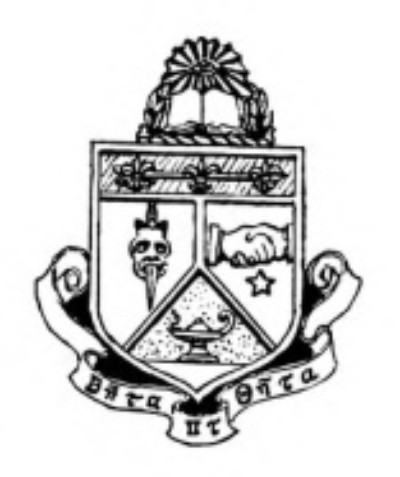
- Founded: 1924; 102 years ago Birmingham, Alabama, US
- Type: Honor
- Affiliation: Independent
- Status: Defunct
- Defunct date: 1948
- Emphasis: French
- Scope: National
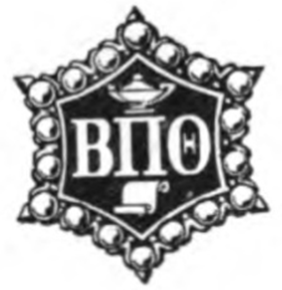
- Member badge
- Colors: Royal Purple, Gold and White
- Flower: Lily
- Publication: What's Doing in Beta Pi Theta
- Chapters: 43
- Headquarters: United States

Beta Pi Theta (ΒΠΘ) was an American college honor society for French. It was established in 1924 in Birmingham, Alabama and expanded to 35 sponsored chapters before going defunct in 1948. Some of its chapters continued as independent, local societies and many eventually joined Pi Delta Phi by 1960.

== History ==
Beta Pi Theta was a French honorary society that was established by Elizabeth "Bessie" Louise Standifer in 1924. It was established "for organizing representative men and women in universities and colleges who by travel, study, conversation, interest, influence and ability will advance the progress of literary French and things cultural in America; who will maintain the highest scholarship and literary standards; who will encourage consecration to social service and the highest ideals of a liberal education, and who will recognize and award merit in productive French literature."

The society's first chapter was formed on April 20, 1926, in Birmingham, Alabama. This expanded to include chapters at Adrian College, Iowa Wesleyan College, Eureka College, Baker University, Coker College, and Park College in 1926. Standifer served the society's executive secretary from 1927 to 1928.

By 1930, Beta Pi Theta had 21 chapters. Five years later, it had established 35 chapters, mainly in Southern and Eastern U.S. universities and colleges; however, the society was mostly inactive during World War II.

Although it attempted to reform after the war, Beta Pi Theta was defunct nationally by 1948. Several chapters continued to operate as local organizations until they were invited to join Pi Delta Phi, including Pi Gamma at Miami University in 1949, Theta Omega at Wintrop College in 1950, Theta Beta at Adrian College in 1950, Theta Nu at Howard College in 1953.

== Symbols ==
Beta Pi Theta's badge was a hexagon with concave sides bearing the Greek letters "ΒΠΘ", with a Greek lamp above the letters and a scroll beneath the letters. The society's key was rectangular with its coat-of-arms on the obverse side and the Greek letters "ΒΠΘ" on the reverse side. Its pledge button was an unmounted version of the society's coat-of-arms.

Beta Pi Theta's colors were royal purple, gold, and white. Its flower was the lily. Its publication was What's Doing in Beta Pi Theta.

== Activities ==
Beta Phi Theta's meetings were conducted entirely in French. Chapters also sponsored cultural events such as presenting a play performed in French.

At the national level, Beta Phi Theta sponsored three annual contests: an essay contest that awarded a Beta Phi Theta ring and a scholarship to Middlebury College's summer French language school; a poetry contest whose winner received a scholarship to attend the summer session of McGill University's French School; and a scholarship contest that awarded a Beta Phi Theta ring and a trip to study abroad.

The national society also awarded its Beta Pi Theta Cup annually to the chapter that demonstrated the greatest efficiency.

== Membership ==
Open to graduate and undergraduate students from French and foreign language departments, membership in Beta Pi Theta required: sophomore standing; a general scholarship grade of above average for the student's particular college; a minimum grade average in French of 90; and an expressed continued interest in French literature, drama, art, music, conversation, travel, and study.

Membership was also open to the French faculty of the sponsoring institutions and to others who provided distinguished service to the society.

== Governance ==
The officers of chapters included: president, vice-president, secretary, treasurer, local editor, corresponding secretary, publication manager, student critic, parliamentarian, and sentinel. Chapters also had a faculty advisor.

== Chapters ==
Except for its first chapter, which was called "Alpha", Beta Phi Chi gave its chapters names consisting of two Greek letters, starting with "Theta". Following are the chapters of Beta Phi Theta.

Chapter	Charter date and range	Institution	Location	Status	Ref.
Alpha	April 20, 1926	Birmingham citywide	Birmingham, Alabama	Inactive	
Theta Beta	1926–1948	Adrian College	Adrian, Michigan	Withdrew (local)	(Note: Chapter withdrew and continued as a local group when Beta Pi Theta ceased operations at the national level. It became the Alpha Nu chapter of Pi Delta Phi on May 22, 1950.)
Theta Gamma	1926	Iowa Wesleyan College	Mount Pleasant, Iowa	Inactive	
Theta Delta	1926	Eureka College	Eureka, Illinois	Inactive	
Theta Epsilon	May 1926	Baker University	Baldwin City, Kansas	Inactive	
Theta Zeta	April 1926	Coker College	Hartsville, South Carolina	Inactive	(Note: Chapter formed from the French Club of Coker College.)
Theta Eta	1926	Park College	Parkville, Missouri	Inactive	
Theta Theta	May 13, 1926	Shorter College	Rome, Georgia	Inactive	(Note: Chapter formed from Le Cercle Français (local).)
Theta Iota	1928	St. Lawrence University	Canton, New York	Inactive	
Theta Kappa	1926	Florida State College for Women	Tallahassee, Florida	Inactive	
Theta Lambda	192x ?	Gordon State College	Barnesville, Georgia	Inactive	
Theta Mu	1926	Queen's College (later Queen's–Chicora College)	Charlotte, North Carolina	Inactive	
Theta Nu	May 1926 – 1948	Howard College	Birmingham, Alabama	Withdrew (local)	(Note: Chapter formed from Le Cercle Français, a local French sorority that was established in 1925.) (Note: Chapter withdrew and continued as a local continued as a local group when Beta Pi Theta ceased operations at the national level. It became the Beta Zeta chapter of Pi Delta Phi on April 28, 1953.)
Theta Xi	April 1927	Lindenwood College	St. Charles, Missouri	Inactive	
Theta Omicron	1927	Mt. Union College	Alliance, Ohio	Inactive	
Theta Pi	March 12, 1927	Nebraska Wesleyan University	Lincoln, Nebraska	Inactive	(Note: Chapter formed from the Fleur de Lis, a local French club.)
Theta Rho	March 28, 1927 – 1941	Wofford College	Spartanburg, South Carolina	Withdrew (local)	(Note: The chapter withdrew in 1941, when Beta Phi Theta national went inactive due to World War II, and became a local French fraternity called Les Copains Français.)
Theta Sigma	1930	University of Chattanooga	Chattanooga, Tennessee	Inactive	
Theta Tau	1928	University of Maine	Orono, Maine	Inactive	
Theta Upsilon	1927	West Virginia University	Morgantown, West Virginia	Inactive	
Theta Phi	1927–1941	Southern Methodist University	Dallas, Texas	Inactive	
Theta Chi	1927	Baylor University	Waco, Texas	Inactive	
Theta Psi				Inactive	
Theta Omega	1929 –1948	Winthrop College	Rock Hill, South Carolina	Withdrew (local)	(Note: Chapter withdrew and continued as a local continued as a local group when Beta Pi Theta ceased operations at the national level. It became the Alpha Mu chapter of Pi Delta Phi on May 16, 1950.)
Pi Alpha				Inactive	
Pi Beta	1929	University of Maryland, College Park	College Park, Maryland	Inactive	
Pi Gamma	1929–1948	Miami University	Oxford, Ohio	Withdrew (local)	(Note: Chapter withdrew and continued as a local continued as a local group when Beta Pi Theta ceased operations at the national level. It became the Alpha Eta chapter of Pi Delta Phi in 1949.)
Pi Delta	19xx ?	Knox College	Galesburg, Illinois	Inactive	
Pi Epsilon	1930	Dakota Wesleyan University	Mitchell, South Dakota	Inactive	
Pi Zeta	1930	Longwood College	Farmville, Virginia	Inactive	
Pi Eta	1931	Baylor College for Women	Belton, Texas	Inactive	
Pi Theta				Inactive	
Pi Iota	November 3, 1931	Kearney State Teachers' College	Kearney, Nebraska	Inactive	
Pi Kappa				Inactive	
Pi Lambda	April 26, 1932	Limestone College	Gaffney, South Carolina	Inactive	(Note: Chapter formed from the French Club.)
Pi Mu	March 9, 1932	Rutgers University–New Brunswick	New Brunswick, New Jersey	Inactive	(Note: Chapter formed from the Alliance Française de New Brunswick.)
Pi Nu	193x ?	University of South Carolina	Columbia, South Carolina	Inactive	(Note: Charter formed from Le Cercle Français, established in January 1932 to join Beta Pi Theta.)
Pi Xi	February 1936	Bowling Green State University	Bowling Green, Ohio	Inactive	(Note: Chapter formed from Cercle Français (local), established in May 1934.)
Pi Omicron	May 8, 1937	Louisiana College	Pineville, Louisiana	Inactive	(Note: Chapter formed from the Louisiana College French Club.)
Pi Pi				Inactive	
Pi Rho	May 1937	Murray State University	Murray, Kentucky	Inactive	
Pi Sigma	May 20, 1937	McKendree University	Lebanon, Illinois	Inactive	
Pi Tau	November 1937 – January 1, 1940	Baldwin Wallace College	Berea, Ohio	Withdrew (local)	(Note: Chapter formed from the Baldwin-Wallace College French Club. On January 1, 1940, it withdrew and formed the local honor society, Sigma Lambda Alpha, according to the 1940 yearbook.)
		Butler University	Indianapolis, Indiana	Inactive	
		Mississippi State College	Starkville, Mississippi	Inactive	
		University of Alabama	Tuscaloosa, Alabama	Inactive	
