= Société Honoraire de Français =

American high school honor society for French

- Founded: 1927; 98 years ago New York
- Type: Honor
- Affiliation: American Association of Teachers of French
- Status: Active
- Emphasis: High School French
- Scope: National (United States)
- Motto: Avoir une autre langue, c'est posséder une deuxième âme "To have another language is to have a second soul"
- Colors: Blue, White, and Red
- Publication: National Bulletin; French Review
- Chapters: 1733
- Headquarters: 7333 West Jefferson Avenue, Suite 240; Lakewood, Colorado 80235; United States
- Website: www.frenchteachers.org/shf/

The Société Honoraire de Français (French National Honor Society) is an organization whose intent is to recognize high school students in the United States who have maintained excellent grades in at least three semesters of French language courses; this is done by induction into the organization.

== Induction ==
At induction, the SHF history is usually read, culminating with the lighting of candles. Each student holds a candle, and the student next to him or her recites the motto, Avoir une autre langue, c'est posséder une deuxième âme, which means To have another language is to have a second soul. All the members are considered inducted when the last candle is lit.

== Duties ==
Community service is mandatory for the organization, as well as a high-grade point average overall (at least a B average in all other courses), in addition to an A in French classes during the semester of selection.

== See also ==
- American Association of Teachers of French
- German National Honor Society
- National Honor Society
- Spanish National Honor Society
- Pi Delta Phi, the French National Honor Society (for U.S. college and university students)
