= Ben-Wiley Hotel =

Historic building in North Carolina, United States

- U.S. National Register of Historic Places
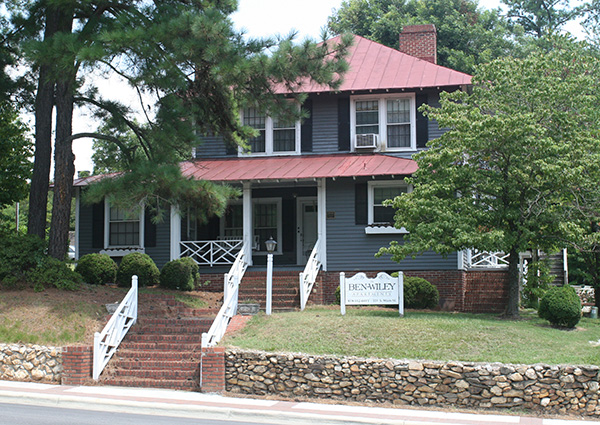
- Ben Wiley Hotel, August 2006

- Location within North Carolina Location within the United States
- Location: 331 S. Main St., Fuquay-Varina, North Carolina
- Coordinates: 35°34′51″N 78°47′59″W
- Area: less than one acre
- Built: 1925
- Architectural style: Bungalow/craftsman
- MPS: Wake County MPS
- NRHP reference No.: 97000195
- Added to NRHP: February 27, 1997

Ben-Wiley Hotel is a historic hotel building located at Fuquay-Varina, Wake County, North Carolina. It was built in 1925, and is a Bungalow / American Craftsman style frame building consisting of two hip-roofed blocks; the two-story main block with a hip roofed front porch, and a two-story rear block. It is sheathed in weatherboard and has widely overhanging eaves. It was converted from 12 hotel rooms to 6 apartments in 1947.

It was listed on the National Register of Historic Places in 1997. It is also a Contributing Property to the Fuquay Springs Historic District.
