= Pi Delta Phi =

American honor society for French

- ΠΔΦ
- Founded: 1906; 120 years ago University of California, Berkeley
- Type: Honor
- Affiliation: ACHS
- Status: Active
- Emphasis: French
- Scope: International
- Motto: Probaínomen Diakritoi Philogálatoi "Forward, faithful friends of French culture"
- Colors: Blue, White, and Red
- Flower: Fleur-de-lis
- Publication: À Vous l'honneur
- Chapters: 417
- Members: 100,000+ lifetime
- Headquarters: c/o Dr. Olga Amarie; Georgia Southern University; Dept. of World Languages and Cultures; P.O. Box 8081; 950 I.T. Drive; Statesboro, Georgia 30460; United States
- Website: www.pideltaphi.org

Pi Delta Phi (ΠΔΦ) is the National French Honor Society—La Société d'Honneur de Français for undergraduate and graduate students at public and private colleges and universities in the United States and France. The society was formed at the University of California, Berkeley in 1906. Pi Delta Phi is a member of the Association of College Honor Societies.

== History ==
Pi Delta Phi was founded in 1906 as a departmental honor society for French at the University of California, Berkeley. After many years as a local organization, Pi Delta Phi reorganized and declared itself the National French Honor Society in 1920. The society's purpose is "to recognize outstanding scholarship in the French language and Francophone literatures, to increase the knowledge and appreciation of Americans for the cultural contributions of the French-speaking world, and to stimulate and to encourage French and Francophone cultural activities".

Pi Delta Phi chartered its Beta chapter at the University of Southern California in 1925, and the Gamma chapter at the University of California, Los Angeles in 1926. The society expanded slowly during the next fifteen years but added chapters rapidly after World War II. In 1949 the American Association of Teachers of French (AATF) endorsed the Society officially as the only collegiate French honor society in the United States.

Pi Delta Phi awarded its first undergraduate scholarship in 1955. In 1963, the society had ninety active chapters and 27,000 initiates. The society was admitted to membership in the Association of College Honor Societies in 1967. By 2011, Pi Delta Phi had 352 active chapters and 60,000 initiates.

As of 2026, Phi Delta Phi has chartered 421 chapters in the United States and France. Its headquarters is in Statesboro, Georgia.

== Symbols ==
The motto of Pi Delta Phi is Probaínomen Diakritoi Philogálatoi or Avançons, amis fidèles de la culture française in French or "Forward, faithful friends of French culture". The society's badge is on oblong rectangular key with the Greek letters "ΠΔΦ" on a vertical band.

Members may wear the society's blue, white, and red honor cords at graduation. The society's flower is the fleur-de-lis. Its online publication is À Vous l'honneur.

== Activities ==
Pi Delta Phi awards three annual undergraduate scholarships for summer study abroad in France and Québec, and a graduate award for research or study in a French-speaking country or region. Chapters may host cultural events on campus or in their community to promote the French language and the many cultures of the French-speaking world.

== Membership ==
Undergraduate sophomores are eligible for membership after completing one semester of upper-division French with a GPA of at least 3.0 in French, 3.30 overall, and a class rank in the top 35 percent. Graduate students who did not join the society as undergraduates are eligible for membership after completing 2 graduate courses in French with an overall graduate GPA of at least 3.50. Students who do not meet eligibility requirements may join as honorary members. Faculty, university staff, alumni, community leaders, and others who support the society's purpose are eligible for honorary membership.

== Governance ==
Pi Delta Phi's executive board, composed of four elected regional vice presidents, is chaired by an elected president who appoints the society's executive director and digital media editor.

== Chapters ==
As of May 2025, Pi Delta Phi has chartered 415 chapters in the United States and two chapters at American universities in Paris and Aix-en-Provence, France.

== Notable members ==
- Emily Apter, academic, translator, and editor
- Jackson Gregory, teacher, journalist, and writer
- Kit Reed, author, novelist, and journalist

== See also ==
- Beta Pi Theta
- Honor cords
- Société Honoraire de Français
