= List of sheriffs of Wake County, North Carolina =

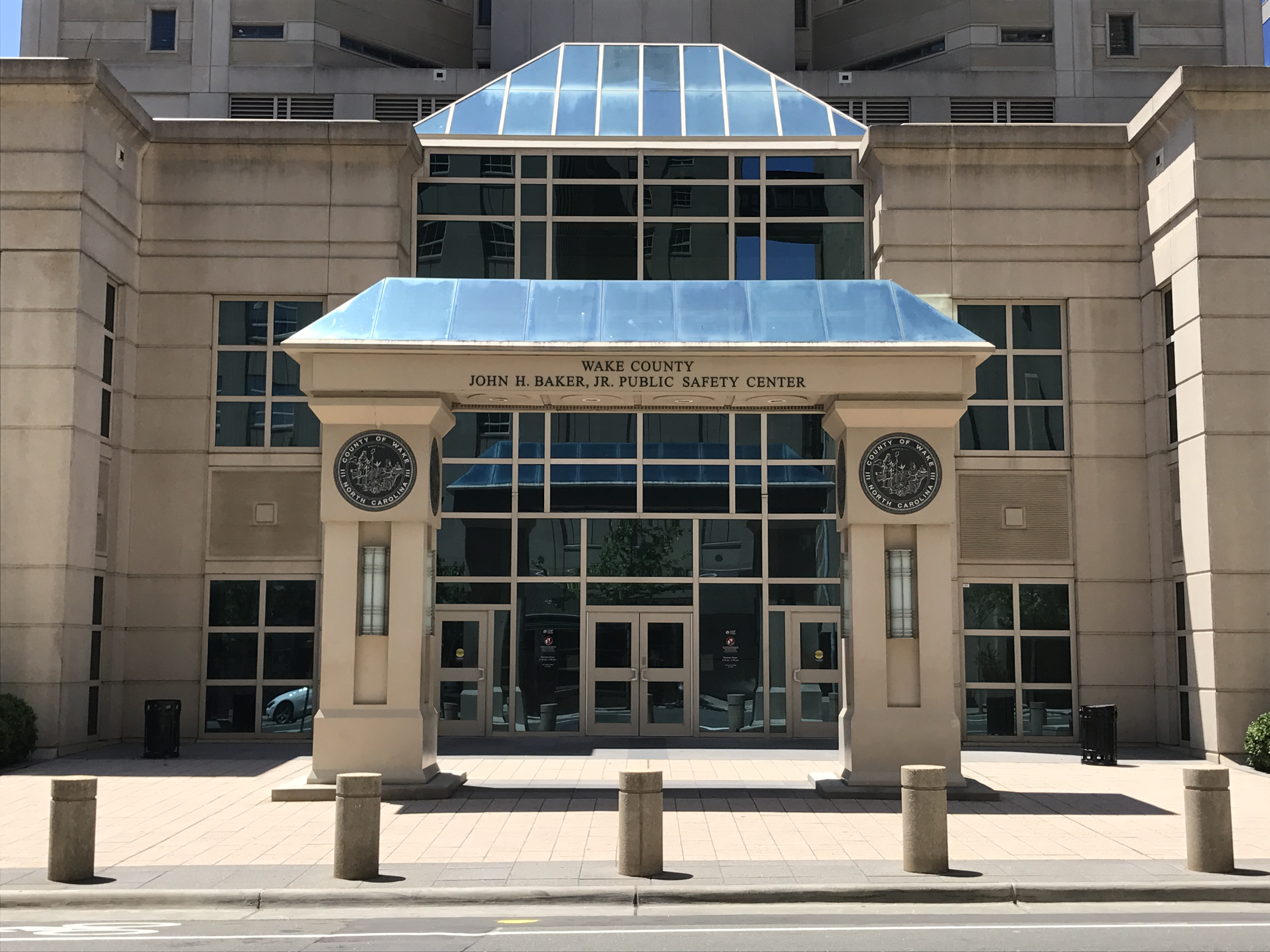
Wake County John H. Baker Jr. Public Safety Center

The sheriff of Wake County, North Carolina is responsible for law enforcement in the unincorporated areas of Wake County, North Carolina. Sheriffs within the State of North Carolina are directly elected to four-year terms. Prior to 1938, sheriffs were elected to two-year terms. The Wake County Sheriff's Office is headquartered within the Wake County John H. Baker Jr. Public Safety Center in Raleigh, North Carolina.

== Sheriffs of Wake County, North Carolina ==
List of sheriffs of Wake County, North Carolina
No.	Portrait	Name (Birth–Death)	Term	Party (Note: Reflects the sheriff's political party at the start of their term. Changes during their time in office are noted.)
1		Michael Rogers (1738 - 1797)	1771 – 1774	
2		Thomas Hines (? - 1808)	1774 – 1777	
3		Thomas Wooten (1725 - 1808)	1777 – 1780	Patriot (American Revolution)
4		Hardy Sanders (? - 1806)	1780 – 1782	
5		Britain Sanders (? - 1808)	1782 –	
6		Nathaniel Jones (? - 1810)	1785 – 1787	
7		Tignal Jones (? - 1807)	1787 – 1787	
8		Tignal Jones, Jr. (? - 1824)	1787 – 1788	
9		John Hinton (? - ?)	1788 – 1789	
10		William Hinton (? - ?)	1789 – 1790	
11		John Davis (? - 1829)	1790 – 1792	
12		Richard Banks (? - ?)	1792 – 1794	
13		Lodwick Alford (? - ?)	1794 – 1796	
14		Samuel High (? - 1812)	1796 – 1798	
15		Jacob Bledsoe (? - ?)	1798 – 1799	
16		Lewis Bledsoe (? - 1831)	1799 – 1800	
17		David Justice (? - ?)	1800 – 1801	
18		John Davis (? - 1829)	1801 – 1803	
19		John Martin (? - 1833)	1803 – 1804	
20		John Davis (? - 1829)	1804 – 1805	
21		John Martin (? - 1833)	1805 – 1806	
22		Nathaniel (Crabtree) Jones (? - 1828)	1806 – 1808	Federalist
23		Willie Jones (? - 1846)	1808 – 1810	
24		John Grant Rencher (? - 1812)	1810 – 1812	
25		Matthew McCullers (? - 1825)	1812 – 1814	
26		Edward Pride (? - ?)	1814 – 1815	
27		Isaac Lane (? - ?)	1815 – 1816	Democratic-Republican
28		William Hinton (? - ?)	1816 – 1817	
29		Henry Moring (? - ?)	1817 – 1819	
30		Samuel Whitaker (? - 1857)	1819 – 1821	Democratic-Republican
31		Woodson Clements (? - 1837)	1821 – 1823	Democratic-Republican
32		Turner Pullen (? - 1867)	1823 – 1825	Whig
33		John Dunn (? - ?)	1825 – 1827	
34		William R. Hinton (? - 1839)	1827 – 1832	Democratic
35		Paschal B. Burt (? - 1859)	1832 – 1840	Democratic
36		James Edwards (? - 1847)	1840 – 1847	Democratic
37		Willis Scott (? - 1858)	1847 – 1847	Whig
38		Willie Pope (? - 1854)	1847 – 1848	Democratic
39		Calvin Jobe Rogers (? - 1876)	1848 – 1850	Whig
40		William Henderson High (1820 - 1897)	1850 – 1865	Democratic
41		John P. H. Russ (? - 1879)	1865 – 1866	National Union
42		Erastus Hugh Ray, Sr. (1832 - 1907)	1866 – 1868	Democratic
43		Rufus King Ferrell (1828 - 1900)	1868 – 1868	Democratic
44		Timothy Francis Lee (1839 - 1912)	1868 – 1874	Republican
45		Sidney Moring Dunn (1841 - 1891)	1874 – 1876	Democratic
46		Jeremiah James Nowell (1832 - 1882)	1876 – 1882	Republican
47		Jesse Robert Nowell (1841 - 1897)	1882 – 1886	Democratic
48		Julius Rowan Rogers (1843 - 1931)	1886 – 1890	Republican
49		Malcus Williamson Page (1835 - 1910)	1890 – 1906	Democratic
50		Joseph Haywood Sears (1872 - 1941)	1906 – 1920	Democratic
51		David Bryant Harrison (1861 - 1952)	1920 – 1926	Democratic
52		Numa Fletcher Turner (1877 - 1955)	1926 – 1946	Democratic
53		Robert James Pleasants (1913 - 1989)	1946 – 1978	Democratic
54		John Haywood Baker, Jr. (1935 - 2007)	1978 – 2002	Democratic
55		Donnie Harrison (b. 1946)	2002 – 2018	Republican
56		Gerald Maruoka Baker (b. 1962)	2018 – 2022	Democratic
57		Willie Rowe (b. 1959)	2022 – Incumbent	Democratic

== Works cited ==
General

- Murray, Elizabeth Reid (1983). Wake: Capital County of North Carolina - Volume I - Prehistory through Centennial. Raleigh, North Carolina: Capital County Publishing Company. p. Appendix B. ISBN 9780963919816. LCCN 2008930989.

Online sources

- Craven, J. (September 17, 1798). "North Carolina. Comptroller's Office, August 28, '98". The North-Carolina Journal. Raleigh, North Carolina. p. 3.
- Bledsoe, Lewis (November 12, 1799). "CITY LOTS". Weekly Raleigh Register. Raleigh, North Carolina. p. 2.
- Weekly Raleigh Register staff (August 25, 1801). "Raleigh". Weekly Raleigh Register. Raleigh, North Carolina. p. 3.
- Weekly Raleigh Register staff (May 9, 1803a). "TO THE Editor of the Raleigh Register". Weekly Raleigh Register. Raleigh, North Carolina. p. 3.
- Weekly Raleigh Register staff (May 23, 1803b). "Raleigh". Weekly Raleigh Register. Raleigh, North Carolina. p. 3.
- Weekly Raleigh Register staff (May 28, 1804). "Raleigh". Weekly Raleigh Register. Raleigh, North Carolina. p. 3.
- Weekly Raleigh Register staff (July 22, 1805). "Raleigh". Weekly Raleigh Register. Raleigh, North Carolina. p. 3.
- Weekly Raleigh Register staff (February 17, 1806). "Died". Weekly Raleigh Register. Raleigh, North Carolina. p. 3.
- The Raleigh Minerva staff (September 3, 1807). "DIED". The Raleigh Minerva. Raleigh, North Carolina. p. 3.
- Jones, Nathaniel (July 22, 1807). "PURSUANT". Weekly Raleigh Register. Raleigh, North Carolina. p. 2.
- A MLITIA MAN (April 27, 1809). "For the Minerva". The Raleigh Minerva. Raleigh, North Carolina. p. 3.
- Weekly Raleigh Register staff (February 8, 1810). "DIED". Weekly Raleigh Register. Raleigh, North Carolina. p. 3.
- Weekly Raleigh Register staff (May 24, 1811). "Raleigh". Weekly Raleigh Register. Raleigh, North Carolina. p. 3.
- Weekly Raleigh Register staff (September 4, 1812a). "Sheriff's Sales". Weekly Raleigh Register. Raleigh, North Carolina. p. 4.
- Weekly Raleigh Register staff (December 18, 1812b). "DIED". Weekly Raleigh Register. Raleigh, North Carolina. p. 3.
- Lane, I. (September 8, 1815). "SHERIFF'S SALE". The North-Carolina Star. Raleigh, North Carolina. p. 2.
- The Raleigh Register staff (February 1, 1825). "State of North Carolina". The Raleigh Register. Raleigh, North Carolina. p. 4.
- Fayetteville Weekly Observer staff (April 15, 1824). "JACKSON MEETING". Fayetteville Weekly Observer. Fayetteville, North Carolina. p. 2.
- The North-Carolina Star staff (July 16, 1824). "Sheriff's Sale". The North-Carolina Star. Raleigh, North Carolina. p. 4.
- Weekly Raleigh Register staff (July 15, 1825). "DIED". Weekly Raleigh Register. Raleigh, North Carolina. p. 3.
- The North-Carolina Star staff (September 29, 1826). "Jailor's Notice". The North-Carolina Star. Raleigh, North Carolina. p. 4.
- Hinton, W. R. (August 10, 1827). "Land adjoining the City". The Raleigh Register. Raleigh, North Carolina. p. 4.
- Raleigh Register staff (August 13, 1829). "Murder!". Raleigh Register. Raleigh, North Carolina. p. 1.
- The Charlotte Journal staff (October 11, 1830). "Members of the General Assembly for 1830, AND SHERIFFS". The Charlotte Journal. Charlotte, North Carolina. p. 1.
- The North-Carolina Star staff (July 15, 1832). "JACKSON MEETING". The North-Carolina Star. Raleigh, North Carolina. p. 3.
- Weekly Raleigh Register staff (March 5, 1833). "OBITUARY". Weekly Raleigh Register. Raleigh, North Carolina. p. 3.
- The Weekly Standard staff (February 4, 1836). "Candidates for General Assembly". The Weekly Standard. Raleigh, North Carolina. p. 3.
- The Weekly Standard staff (November 29, 1837). "DIED". The Weekly Standard. Raleigh, North Carolina. p. 3.
- The Weekly Standard staff (May 30, 1838). "Democratic Republican Candidates for the Legislature of North Carolina". The Weekly Standard. Raleigh, North Carolina. p. 2.
- The North-Carolina Star staff (April 24, 1839). "WHIG MEETING". The North-Carolina Star. Raleigh, North Carolina. p. 3.
- Fayetteville Weekly Observer staff (October 30, 1839). "DIED". Fayetteville Weekly Observer. Fayetteville, North Carolina. p. 3.
- The Raleigh Register staff (September 25, 1840). "WHIG STATE CONVENTION". The Raleigh Register. Raleigh, North Carolina. p. 3.
- The Weekly Standard staff (March 30, 1842). "MEETING IN RALEIGH DISTRICT". The Weekly Standard. Raleigh, North Carolina. p. 3.
- The Rasp staff (August 6, 1842). "The Entire Democratic Ticket". The Rasp. Raleigh, North Carolina. p. 3.
- The Weekly Standard staff (January 31, 1844). "MEETING AT HOLLY SPRINGS". The Weekly Standard. Raleigh, North Carolina. p. 2.
- A NEIGHBOR (February 17, 1847). "OBITUARY". The Weekly Standard. Raleigh, North Carolina. p. 3.
- The Weekly Standard staff (September 22, 1847a). "DIED". The Weekly Standard. Raleigh, North Carolina. p. 3.
- The Weekly Standard staff (September 29, 1847b). "Willis Scott, Esq". The Weekly Standard. Raleigh, North Carolina. p. 3.
- Wilmington Journal staff (November 26, 1847). "Wake County Court". Wilmington Journal. Wilmington, North Carolina. p. 2.
- Weekly Raleigh Register staff (August 23, 1848). "Calvin J. Rogers". Weekly Raleigh Register. Raleigh, North Carolina. p. 3.
- The Weekly Standard staff (August 7, 1850). "NORTH CAROLINA STANDARD". The Weekly Standard. Raleigh, North Carolina. p. 2.
- The Biblical Recorder staff (August 10, 1850). "Election Returns". The Biblical Recorder. Raleigh, North Carolina. p. 2.
- The Weekly Standard staff (June 7, 1854). "DIED". The Weekly Standard. Raleigh, North Carolina. p. 3.
- The Greensboro Patriot staff (November 27, 1857). "Death of Samuel Whitaker, Sen". The Greensboro Patriot. Greensboro, North Carolina. p. 2.
- The Weekly Raleigh Register staff (March 10, 1858). "DIED". Weekly Raleigh Register. Raleigh, North Carolina. p. 1.
- The Weekly Standard staff (September 14, 1859). "SUDDEN DEATHS". The Weekly Standard. Raleigh, North Carolina. p. 3.
- The Daily Conservative staff (May 17, 1864). "The Holden Destructives". The Daily Conservative. Raleigh, North Carolina. p. 2.
- The New Berne Times staff (July 13, 1865). "COL RUSS". The New Berne Times. New Bern, North Carolina. p. 3.
- The Daily Standard staff (November 11, 1865). "The Election". The Daily Standard. Raleigh, North Carolina. p. 2.
- Beeswax (November 20, 1865). "For the New Berne Daily Times". The New Berne Times. New Bern, North Carolina. p. 7.
- The Daily Standard staff (February 5, 1866a). "City and State Items". The Daily Standard. Raleigh, North Carolina. p. 3.
- The Daily Standard staff (May 26, 1866b). "Insurance". The Daily Standard. Raleigh, North Carolina. p. 4.
- The Daily Standard staff (December 24, 1867). "Death of Old Citizens". The Daily Standard. Raleigh, North Carolina. p. 2.
- The Wilmington Post staff (February 4, 1868). "A NEW SHERIFF". The Wilmington Post. Wilmington, North Carolina. p. 3.
- The Daily North Carolinian staff (March 8, 1868). "The White Man's Ticket!". The Daily North Carolinian. Raleigh, North Carolina. p. 3.
- The Weekly Era staff (August 1, 1872). "REPUBLICAN NOMINATIONS". The Weekly Era. Raleigh, North Carolina. p. 2.
- The Charlotte Democrat staff (September 14, 1874). "WAKE COUNTY". The Charlotte Democrat. Charlotte, North Carolina. p. 2.
- The Raleigh Sentinel staff (April 27, 1876). "The Late Calvin J. Rogers". The Raleigh Sentinel. Raleigh, North Carolina. p. 1.
- The Raleigh News staff (January 2, 1880). "North Carolina Necrology". The Raleigh News. Raleigh, North Carolina. p. 1.
- Weekly Standard staff (August 17, 1882). "Death of Sheriff Nowell". Weekly Standard. Raleigh, North Carolina. p. 2.
- The News and Observer staff (August 23, 1882). "Level Headed "M." Talks". The News and Observer. Raleigh, North Carolina. p. 2.
- The Commonwealth staff (September 7, 1882). "DASHES HERE AND THERE". The Commonwealth. Scotland Neck, North Carolina. p. 3.
- Statesville Record and Landmark staff (September 16, 1886). "ITEMS OF STATE POLITICS". Statesville Record and Landmark. Statesville, North Carolina. p. 2.
- The News and Observer staff (December 11, 1886). "For the News and Observer". The News and Observer. Raleigh, North Carolina. p. 1.
- The Daily Evening Visitor staff (November 10, 1890a). "In and Around the City". The Daily Evening Visitor. Raleigh, North Carolina. p. 1.
- The Daily Evening Visitor staff (December 1, 1890b). "OFFICIAL FIELD DAY". The Daily Evening Visitor. Raleigh, North Carolina. p. 1.
- The Day staff (August 18, 1890). "THE LATEST NEWS". The Day. Oxford, North Carolina. p. 1.
- The State Chronicle staff (October 31, 1890). "SCRATCHERS IN CITY POLITICS". The State Chronicle. Raleigh, North Carolina. p. 4.
- The Daily State Chronicle staff (January 21, 1891). "LOCAL HAPPENINGS IN AND AROUND THE CAPITAL". The Daily State Chronicle. Raleigh, North Carolina. p. 1.
- Doub, L L (February 8, 1891). "SIDNEY MORING DUNN". The State Chronicle. Raleigh, North Carolina.
- The Press-Visitor staff (January 15, 1897). "SHORT STATEMENTS". The Press-Visitor. Raleigh, North Carolina. p. 1.
- The Daily Times staff (December 15, 1897). "DEATH OF MR. WM. H. HIGH". The Daily Times. Raleigh, North Carolina. p. 1.
- The Morning Post staff (July 24, 1900). "R. K. FERRELL DEAD". The Morning Post. Raleigh, North Carolina. p. 3.
- Statesville Record and Landmark staff (June 8, 1906). "The commissioners of Wake county". Statesville Record and Landmark. Statesville, North Carolina. p. 2.
- The News and Observer staff (July 22, 1906). "WAKE DEMOCRATS NAME DREWRY FOR THE STATE SENATE". The News and Observer. Raleigh, North Carolina. p. 1.
- The News and Observer staff (May 10, 1910). "Sad Deaths in Cedar Fork". The News and Observer. Raleigh, North Carolina. p. 5.
- The Raleigh Daily Times staff (March 7, 1912). "TIMOTHY F. LEE DEAD". The Raleigh Daily Times staff. Raleigh, North Carolina. p. 1.
- The News and Observer staff (April 8, 1926a). "PENNEY LEADING TICKET IN WAKE". The News and Observer. Raleigh, North Carolina. p. 13.
- The News and Observer staff (November 6, 1926b). "WAKE MAJORITY FROM 4,000 UP". The News and Observer. Raleigh, North Carolina. p. 12.
- The News and Observer staff (December 6, 1926c). "INDUCT COUNTY OFFICIALS TODAY". The News and Observer. Raleigh, North Carolina. p. 2.
- The News and Observer staff (March 7, 1931). "J. ROWAN ROGERS BURIED IN OAKWOOD". The News and Observer. Raleigh, North Carolina. p. 10.
- The News and Observer staff (October 12, 1941). "DEATHS and FUNERALS". The News and Observer. Raleigh, North Carolina. p. 2.
- The News and Observer staff (November 11, 1946a). "WAKE YDC MAKES PLANS FOR MEMBERSHIP DRIVE". The News and Observer. Raleigh, North Carolina. p. 3.
- The News and Observer staff (December 2, 1946b). "COUNTY OFFICIALS TO ASSUME POSTS". The News and Observer. Raleigh, North Carolina. p. 12.
- The News and Observer staff (November 20, 1952). "Former Wake Sheriff Dies". The News and Observer. Raleigh, North Carolina. p. 45.
- The News and Observer staff (September 10, 1955). "Former Sheriff Numa F. Turner Dies Here". The News and Observer. Raleigh, North Carolina. p. 3.
- Kolin, Bob (November 8, 1978). "Helms wins easily over Ingram; Baker elected sheriff in Wake". The News and Observer. Raleigh, North Carolina. p. 1.
- Glascock, Ned (November 30, 1989). "Robert J. Pleasants, former Sheriff, dies". The News and Observer. Raleigh, North Carolina. p. 33.
- The News and Observer staff (November 7, 1994). "Wake Ballot". The News and Observer. Raleigh, North Carolina. p. 14.
- Molina, Camila; McDonald, Thomasi (November 8, 2018). "Sheriff-elect pulls off Wake County's biggest upset". The News & Observer. Raleigh, North Carolina. p. A3.
- Rochman, Bonnie (December 1, 2002). "Baker's long era draws to close". The News & Observer. Raleigh, North Carolina. p. B1.
- McDonald, Thomasi (November 1, 2007). "Law enforcement pioneer dies at 72". The News & Observer. Raleigh, North Carolina. p. 1.
- The News & Observer staff (October 30, 2010). "Voters Guide". The News & Observer. Raleigh, North Carolina. p. 5V.
- "North Carolina Marriages, 1759-1979: John Grant Rencher, 1781" (database). FamilySearch. 1781.
- "North Carolina Estate Files, 1663-1979: Thomas Hines, 1808" (database with images). FamilySearch. North Carolina State Archives, Raleigh, North Carolina. 1808.
- "North Carolina Estate Files, 1663-1979: Britain Sanders, 1808" (database with images). FamilySearch. North Carolina State Archives, Raleigh, North Carolina. 1808.
- "North Carolina Estate Files, 1663-1979: John G Rencher, 1812" (database with images). FamilySearch. North Carolina State Archives, Raleigh, North Carolina. 1812.
- "North Carolina Estate Files, 1663-1979: Nathaniel Jones, 1829" (database with images). FamilySearch. North Carolina State Archives, Raleigh, North Carolina. 1829.
- "United States Revolutionary War Pension Payment Ledgers, 1818-1872: Lewis Bledsoe, 1832" (database with images). FamilySearch. National Archives and Records Administration, Washington, District of Columbia. 1832.
- "North Carolina Estate Files, 1663-1979: Hardy Sanders, 1818" (database with images). FamilySearch. North Carolina State Archives, Raleigh, North Carolina. 1818.
- "North Carolina Estate Files, 1663-1979: John Davis, 1829" (database with images). FamilySearch. North Carolina State Archives, Raleigh, North Carolina. 1829.
- "North Carolina Marriages, 1759-1979: Jesse R. Nowell, 1873" (database). FamilySearch. 1873.
- "United States Census, 1860: Robert Nowell in entry for Willis Nowell, 1860" (database with images). FamilySearch. 1860.
- "Massachusetts, United States Naturalization Records, 1790-1991". FamilySearch. April 23, 1870.
- "California Great Registers, 1850-1920, William Henderson High, 21 October 1872" (database). FamilySearch. 1872.
- "North Carolina Estate Files, 1663-1979: Jeremiah James Nowell, 1882" (database with images). FamilySearch. North Carolina State Archives, Raleigh, North Carolina. 1882.
- "New York, New York City Marriage Records, 1829-1938: Timothy Francis Lee in entry for Charles Fosgate and Maida Lee, 1907" (database). FamilySearch. 1907.
- "North Carolina, County Marriages, 1762-1979: Wake > Marriage bonds, 1800s, vol P-S > image 1438 of 2490" (database with images). FamilySearch. 1853.
- "North Carolina Deaths, 1931-1994: Julius Rowan Rogers" (database). FamilySearch. 1939.
- "North Carolina Deaths, 1931-1994: Joseph Haywood Sears" (database). FamilySearch. 1941.
- "North Carolina Deaths, 1931-1994, James Wesley Rogers" (database). FamilySearch. 1942.
- "North Carolina Deaths, 1931-1994: Miss Pauline Fullen Farrall" (database). FamilySearch. 1946.
- "North Carolina Deaths, 1931-1994: David Bryant Harrison, 1952" (database). FamilySearch. 1952.
- "North Carolina Deaths and Burials, 1898-1994: Numa Fletcher Turner, 1955" (database). FamilySearch. 1955.
- "North Carolina Deaths, 1931-1994: Daisy Page Walker, 1960" (database). FamilySearch. 1960.
- Brown, Geraldine (April 6, 1963). "'Geraldine G. Brown's Personally Speaking". The Carolinian. Raleigh, North Carolina.
- "North Carolina Deaths, 1931-1994: Robert James Pleasants, 1989" (database). FamilySearch. 1989.
- Turco, Ellen (April 16, 2012). "National Register of Historic Places: Williamson Page House" (PDF). State of North Carolina.
- Wake County Sheriff's Office staff (October 23, 2022). "Sheriff Gerald M. Baker". Wake County Sheriff's Office: Gerald M. Baker, Sheriff. Wake County Sheriff's Office.
- North Carolina Sheriffs' Association (2018). "The Office of Sheriff in North Carolina" (PDF). North Carolina Sheriffs' Association.
- Wake County Sheriff's Office staff (2022). "Wake County Sheriff's Office". Wake County Sheriff's Office.
- Perchick, Michael (December 6, 2022). "'Very excited': Willie Rowe discusses goals on his first day as Wake County sheriff". ABC11 Eyewitness News. Raleigh, North Carolina.
- adminnewspack (October 8, 2014). "Elections Willie Rowe". INDY Week.
