= 2010 Connecticut power plant explosion =

Industrial disaster in Middletown, Connecticut

- Location within Connecticut Location within the United States
- Date: February 7, 2010
- Time: 11:17 am EST
- Location: Middletown, Connecticut, United States; 41.5536°N 72.5956°W
- Casualties: 6 dead, less than 50 injured

The 2010 Connecticut power plant explosion occurred at the Kleen Energy Systems power station in Middletown, Connecticut, United States at 11:17 am EST on February 7, 2010. The plant had been under construction from September 2007, and was scheduled to start supplying energy in June 2010. The initial blast killed five and injured at least fifty; one of the injured later died in hospital, bringing the total death toll to six.

== Explosion ==
The blast at the 620-megawatt (830,000 hp), Siemens combined cycle gas and oil-fired power plant occurred at 11:17 am, and was reported at 11:25 am EST. The plant's manager, Gordon Holk, said that contractors and other workers from O & G Industries, Ducci Electric, and Keystone Construction and Maintenance Services were at the site when the blast occurred. The explosion occurred at the rear of the largest building, the turbine hall, which was destroyed. Some residents reported "earthquake-like tremors" from at least 10 miles (16 km) away, although the blast proved not to be seismically detectable. Another resident of the area felt that it was more like a sonic boom.

== Possible causes ==
According to authorities, neither terrorism or an intentional crime was the cause of the explosion, though criminal negligence was being investigated. A neighbor of the plant said that there was natural gas stored there, which was later said to be related to the explosion. Flames were reported to have been coming from a gas pipe until the gas was shut off. The local fire marshal said the explosion was the result of an attempted purging of natural gas from a pipeline as a test, a procedure known as a blow-down, and according to a state official who had been briefed on the incident, the explosion had been sparked by a "flame device," possibly a propane heater. The president of the Connecticut AFL–CIO, however, disagreed with this explanation, saying it was more likely that an inadvertent spark had caused the explosion, rather than an open flame.

== Reaction and follow-up ==
Middletown deputy fire marshal Al Santostefano later said that there had been fewer than 50 people injured, as some of the workers had made it out alive, and that there were no signs of life in the ruins of the plant. At least 12 of the injured were treated at local hospitals. Emergency personnel and almost 20 ambulances were at the scene shortly after the blast occurred, using helicopters to transport victims while search-and-rescue crews with dogs scoured the rubble. Middlesex Hospital in Middletown said it was receiving patients from the blast. At least one victim was also taken to Hartford Hospital. By 1:30pm local time, at least 100 firefighters were at the scene and the fire had been extinguished. Connecticut governor M. Jodi Rell was being briefed by authorities and opened the state's emergency management center, and she later traveled to the scene of the explosion. Connecticut State Police said they were sending detectives to investigate the explosion.

Rescue officials at the plant turned away reporters because hazardous material leakage was possible. Nearby hospitals and surrounding states also offered to aid in the rescue process. The Joint Terrorism Task Force also arrived at the site of the explosion but were only there to monitor, as local and state officials were handling the investigation. The federal Chemical Safety Board deployed a seven-person team to the site, which was expected to be on the scene by Monday, February 8, but was later prohibited from entering the site. The mayor of Middletown said the plant will ultimately be rebuilt, a statement that was confirmed by a Kleen Energy official, who said that construction would resume once the investigation into the incident was completed. In February 2011, it was announced that Kleen Energy and O&G Industries will build a memorial park to honor those who died or were injured during the blast. The plant underwent extensive repairs during the remainder of 2010 and early 2011, and is scheduled to open in April 2011.

== Investigation ==
The investigation into the incident started the day after the explosion, and was conducted by agencies at the local, state and federal levels. It was expected to focus on whether human error or insufficient safety protocols were at fault. In particular, according to the local fire marshal, the investigation was to look at whether electricity was cut off from the area, whether workers had been evacuated before the purging of the gas line, and whether ignition sources were present. Several days before the explosion, the Chemical Safety Board had approved new recommendations on gas line purging in the United States following an explosion at a 2009 ConAgra Foods plant explosion in North Carolina in 2009 that killed four people. Despite the Board's interest in the case, a spokesman said on February 9 that their team of investigators was being denied entrance to the site of the explosion, on the grounds that the area was a crime scene. (The Chemical Safety Board did eventually deploy a team of ten investigators to the site.) The USCSB also released a video documenting their investigation.

On August 5, 2010, the Occupational Safety and Health Administration (OSHA) announced that it planned to fine seventeen companies involved in the construction of the plant a total of $16.6 million. OSHA said that it had found a total of 371 safety violations in the construction of the plant, 225 of which it considered deliberate. The Chemical Safety Board released its final report on June 28, 2010.
