= Richard Medlin =

American football player (born 1987)

No. 37, 38
- Position: Running back

Personal information
- Born: March 4, 1987 (age 39); Raleigh, North Carolina, U.S.
- Listed height: 5 ft 11 in (1.80 m)
- Listed weight: 200 lb (91 kg)

Career information
- High school: Garner (Garner, North Carolina)
- College: Fayetteville State (2007–2010)
- NFL draft: 2011: undrafted

Career history
- New England Patriots (2011)*; Miami Dolphins (2011); Atlanta Falcons (2012)*
- * Offseason or practice squad member only

Career NFL statistics
- Games played: 1
- Stats at Pro Football Reference

Richard Medlin (born March 4, 1987) is an American former professional football player who was a running back in the National Football League (NFL). He played college football for the Fayetteville State Broncos and was a member of the New England Patriots, Miami Dolphins and Atlanta Falcons in the NFL.

== Early life and college ==
Medlin was born on March 4, 1987, in Raleigh, North Carolina. He attended Garner High School and walked-on to play for the NCAA Division II Fayetteville State Broncos in 2007. He redshirted his first season before working his way up to being a starter as a sophomore. He went on to lead the Broncos in rushing in his last three seasons (2008–2010) while also being their top return specialist. He was named the conference's special teams player of the year in 2008 after returning three kickoffs for touchdowns in a span of two games while averaging 41.7 yards-per-return on the year.

As a junior, Medlin helped Fayetteville State win the conference championship while rushing for 667 yards with a team-high 10 touchdowns. In 2010, he ran for 772 yards and averaged 5.4 yards-per-carry while also placing second on the team with 26 receptions. He was named Fayetteville State's male athlete of the year after his senior season and finished his college career with 2,721 yards rushing and 28 touchdowns.

== Professional career ==
After going unselected in the 2011 NFL draft, Medlin was signed by the New England Patriots as an undrafted free agent on August 3, 2011. He saw extensive action in their first preseason game eight days later, scoring a touchdown on his first carry while finishing the match with 14 rushes for 54 yards and two scores. He finished the preseason with 66 yards on 20 carries as well as 39 receiving yards on six receptions. He was released at the final roster cuts on September 3.

Medlin was signed to the practice squad of the Miami Dolphins on September 21. He was signed to the active roster for the team's final game of the season, against the New York Jets, and made his NFL debut in the 19–17 win, posting no statistics. He was waived by the Dolphins on May 7, 2012. Medlin later signed with the Atlanta Falcons on August 5, 2012. He was released on August 25.
