= Keion White =

American football player (born 1999)

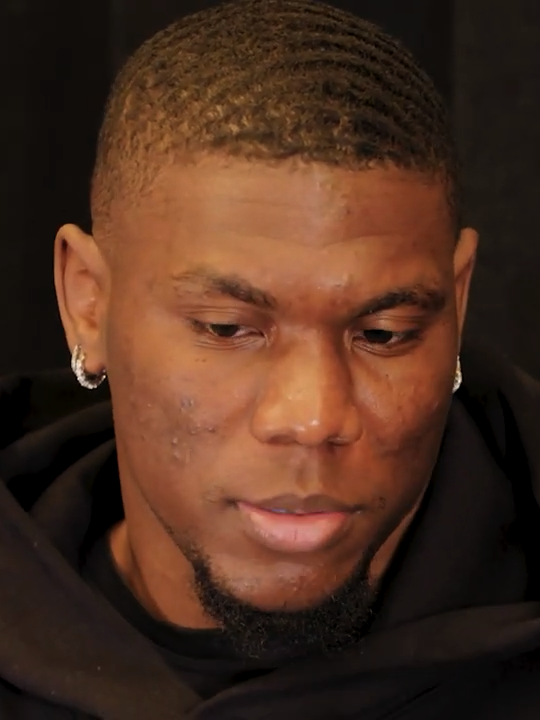
- White in 2023

No. 56 – San Francisco 49ers
- Position: Defensive end
- Roster status: Active

Personal information
- Born: January 20, 1999 (age 27); Raleigh, North Carolina, U.S.
- Listed height: 6 ft 5 in (1.96 m)
- Listed weight: 285 lb (129 kg)

Career information
- High school: Garner Magnet (Garner, North Carolina)
- College: Old Dominion (2017–2020); Georgia Tech (2021–2022)
- NFL draft: 2023: 2nd round, 46th overall pick

Career history
- New England Patriots (2023–2025); San Francisco 49ers (2025–present)

Awards and highlights
- Second-team All-Conference USA (2019); Third-team All-ACC (2022)

Career NFL statistics as of Week 5, 2026
- Total tackles: 109
- Sacks: 10.5
- Forced fumbles: 2
- Fumble recoveries: 2
- Pass deflections: 9
- Stats at Pro Football Reference

Keion White (born January 20, 1999) is an American professional football defensive end for the San Francisco 49ers of the National Football League (NFL). He played college football for the Old Dominion Monarchs and Georgia Tech Yellow Jackets and was selected by the New England Patriots in the second round of the 2023 NFL draft.

== Early life ==
White grew up in Raleigh, North Carolina and attended Garner Magnet High School, where he was a starter at tight end and defensive end on the football team. White was named first team All-Greater Neuse River Conference as a senior after catching 20 catches for 243 yards and four touchdowns. He was rated a three-star recruit and committed to play college football at Old Dominion over offers from Elon, Norfolk State, North Carolina A&T, and Virginia State.

== College career ==
White began his college career playing for the Old Dominion Monarchs, where he initially played tight end.

After redshirting his true freshman season, White started eight games and caught 11 passes for 124 yards as a redshirt freshman.

White moved to defensive end entering his redshirt sophomore season. In his first season on defense, White made 62 tackles with 3.5 sacks and 19 tackles for loss and was named Second-team All-Conference USA.

White opted out of his redshirt junior season in 2020 due to the COVID-19 pandemic and eventually entered the NCAA transfer portal.

White ultimately transferred to Georgia Tech. He broke his ankle playing in a pick-up basketball game prior to his transfer and missed the first eight games of the 2021 season. White played in the final four games of the Yellow Jackets' season and recorded four tackles. He used the extra year of eligibility granted to college athletes in 2020 due to the COVID-19 pandemic and returned to Georgia Tech for the 2022 season.

== Professional career ==
Pre-draft measurables
Height	Weight	Arm length	Hand span	Wingspan	40-yard dash	10-yard split	20-yard split	Vertical jump	Broad jump	Bench press
6 ft 4 7/8 in (1.95 m)	285 lb (129 kg)	34 in (0.86 m)	10 1/8 in (0.26 m)	6 ft 8 in (2.03 m)	4.79 s	1.69 s	2.75 s	34.0 in (0.86 m)	9 ft 9 in (2.97 m)	30 reps
All values from NFL Combine/Pro Day

=== New England Patriots ===
White was selected by the New England Patriots in the second round (46th overall) in the 2023 NFL draft. As a rookie, he finished with a sack, 26 total tackles (12 solo) and three pass deflections in 16 games and four starts.

In the 2024 season, White helped the Patriots to a Week 1 victory on the road in Cincinnati Bengals with 2.5 sacks on quarterback Joe Burrow. Along with White's 2.5 sacks, he had four total tackles, two tackles for a loss, and three quarterback hits.

=== San Francisco 49ers ===
On October 29, 2025, White and a conditional 2026 seventh-round pick were traded to the San Francisco 49ers in exchange for a 2026 sixth-round pick.

== NFL career statistics ==
Legend
**Bold**	Career high

=== Regular season ===
Year	Team	Games		Tackles					Interceptions						Fumbles				
Year	Team	GP	GS	Cmb	Solo	Ast	Sck	TFL	Int	Yds	Avg	Lng	TD	PD	FF	Fum	FR	Yds	TD
2023	NE	16	4	26	12	14	1.0	3	0	0	0.0	0	0	3	0	0	0	0	0
2024	NE	**17**	**13**	**56**	**31**	**25**	**5.0**	**7**	0	0	0.0	0	0	**5**	**2**	0	0	0	0
2025	NE	5	1	6	2	4	0.0	0	0	0	0.0	0	0	0	0	0	0	0	0
2025	SF	9	2	12	5	7	1.5	2	0	0	0.0	0	0	1	0	0	**1**	0	0
2026	SF	5	4	9	5	4	3.0	4	0	0	0.0	0	0	0	0	0	1	0	0
Career		52	24	109	55	54	10.5	16	0	0	0.0	0	0	9	2	0	2	0	0

=== Postseason ===
Year	Team	Games		Tackles					Interceptions						Fumbles				
Year	Team	GP	GS	Cmb	Solo	Ast	Sck	TFL	Int	Yds	Avg	Lng	TD	PD	FF	Fum	FR	Yds	TD
2025	SF	2	0	4	2	2	1.0	1	0	0	0.0	0	0	0	0	0	0	0	0
Career		2	0	4	2	2	1.0	1	0	0	0.0	0	0	0	0	0	0	0	0

== Personal life ==
On February 9, 2026, while attending a Super Bowl LX party in San Francisco, White had a disagreement with prominent rapper Lil Baby resulting in White being shot in the ankle and received emergency surgery the same day. He recovered from being shot and resumed playing the next NFL season.
