= Chris Culliver =

American football player (born 1988)

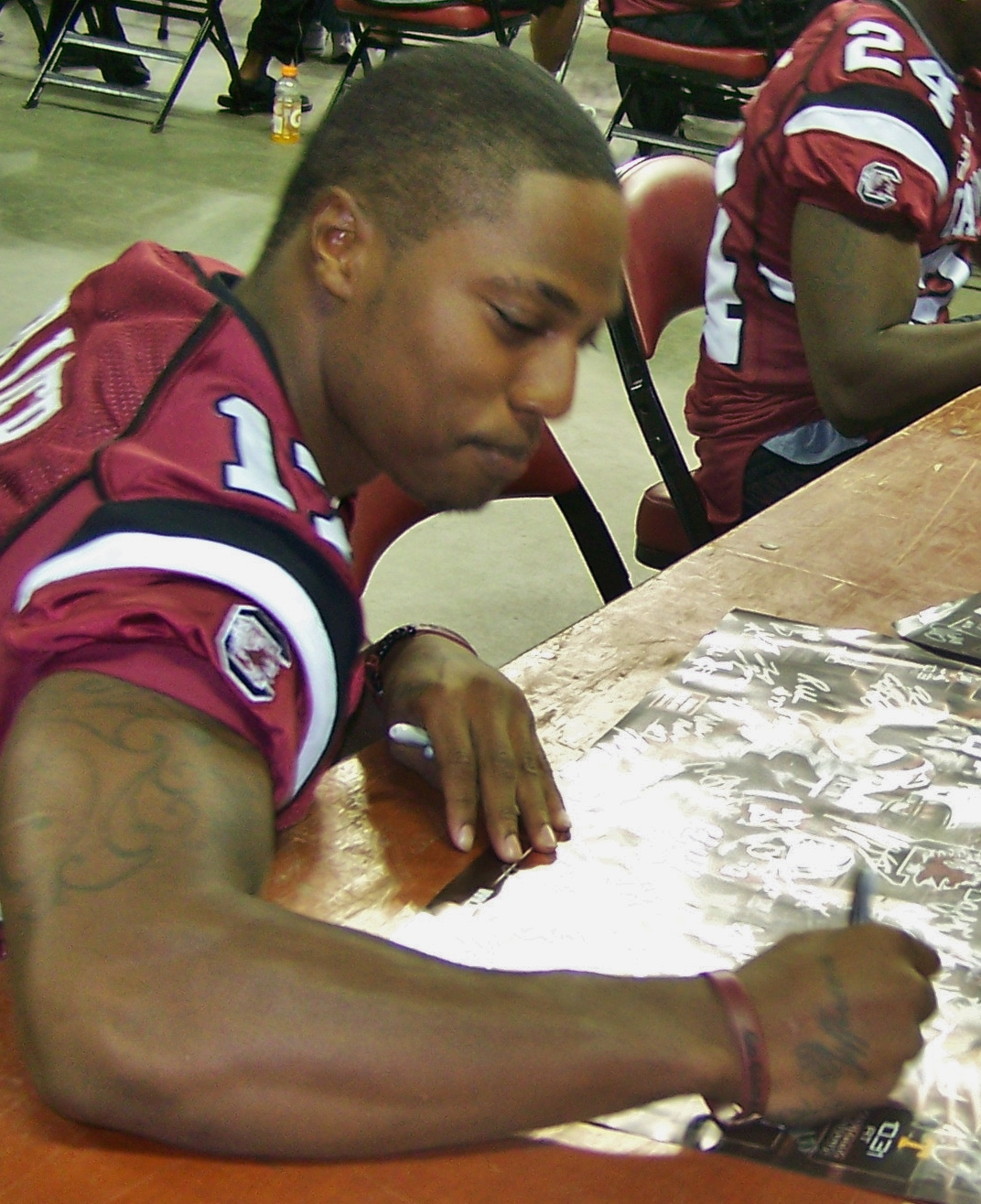
- Culliver signing an autograph in 2009 while with South Carolina

No. 29
- Position: Cornerback

Personal information
- Born: August 17, 1988 (age 38); Philadelphia, Pennsylvania, U.S.
- Listed height: 6 ft 0 in (1.83 m)
- Listed weight: 199 lb (90 kg)

Career information
- High school: Garner (Garner, North Carolina)
- College: South Carolina
- NFL draft: 2011: 3rd round, 80th overall pick

Career history
- San Francisco 49ers (2011–2014); Washington Redskins (2015); Miami Dolphins (2016); Indianapolis Colts (2017)

Awards and highlights
- Second-team All-SEC (2009)

Career NFL statistics
- Total tackles: 145
- Forced fumbles: 2
- Fumble recoveries: 2
- Pass deflections: 34
- Interceptions: 7
- Defensive touchdowns: 1
- Stats at Pro Football Reference

Christopher LaBarren Culliver II (born August 17, 1988) is an American former professional football player who was a cornerback in the National Football League (NFL). He was selected by the San Francisco 49ers in the third round of the 2011 NFL draft. He played college football for the South Carolina Gamecocks.

== Early life ==
Culliver had a difficult start in life. His mother, although she would eventually graduate from Temple University, was single and only 16 years old when he was born. Culliver has a brother four years his junior and twin siblings, a boy and a girl, who are eleven years younger. In 1996, Culliver's stepfather and a cousin were shot to death, and his mother was wounded, in a Philadelphia bar fight.

Culliver graduated from Garner Magnet High School of Garner, North Carolina in 2007. He did not play football until his sophomore year. He produced 127 tackles, seven sacks, and two interceptions as a junior. In his senior year, he was credited with 147 tackles and four interceptions, and, although he started only a handful of games on offense, he logged 1,500 all-purpose yards and returned four kickoffs and two punts for touchdowns. He accounted for over 270 tackles in his final two seasons at Garner. He was the MVP for the East squad in the Offense-Defense All-Star Game after catching three passes for 97 yards, including a 77-yard touchdown reception. He also played in the Shrine Bowl.

Also a standout track & field athlete, Culliver was an elite sprinter. He posted a personal-best time of 10.69 seconds in the 100-meter dash at the 2007 USATF Jr. Olympic Championship, where he placed second in the preliminary rounds. He took second in the 55-meter dash at the 2007 4A NCHSAA Indoor State Championship at 6.45, but posted a PR of 6.08 seconds at the Clayton HS Last Chance Meet.

Culliver was a five-star recruit by Rivals.com, and was the Gamecocks' first five-star signee since Demetris Summers in 2003. He was considered by Rivals.com as the top player in the state of North Carolina and the third-best wide receiver in the country. Rivals.com ranked him as the 19th-best prospect in the country regardless of position, making him USC's highest-rated recruit since Greenwood linebacker Ricardo Hurley was ranked No. 17 among the class of 2002. He was rated a four-star prospect and the No. 13 safety in the country by Scout.com. He was also rated the 37th-best defensive back in the nation and the seventh-best player in the state of North Carolina by SuperPrep. Culliver chose to attend the University of South Carolina over the University of Florida and North Carolina State University.

== College career ==
At South Carolina, Culliver majored in sport and entertainment management and played on the South Carolina Gamecocks football team from 2007 to 2010.

As a freshman in 2007, Culliver was a kickoff returner with 34 returns for 809 yards, the second most single-season kick return yards in school history. Culliver started one game as a wide receiver.

Culliver became the starting free safety in addition to kick returner in 2008. With 12 starts, Culliver made 60 tackles, including 4.5 for losses, as well as three interceptions, three passes deflected, and two forced fumbles.

In February 2009, Culliver almost died from complications following routine shoulder surgery. Culliver returned for his junior season with 12 starts and was the team's third top tackler with 62 and returned 26 kickoffs for 585 yards. Culliver was a second-team All-SEC pick for 2009.

Culliver became cornerback as a senior in 2010. Before a season-ending pectoral muscle injury, Culliver started 7 games and had 34 tackles (including 2.5 tackles for loss), 1 sack, a forced fumble, 2 passes deflected, and 12 kick returns for 261 yards.

== Professional career ==
Pre-draft measurables
Height	Weight	Arm length	Hand span	Wingspan	40-yard dash	10-yard split	20-yard split	20-yard shuttle	Three-cone drill	Vertical jump	Broad jump	Bench press
6 ft 0 3/8 in (1.84 m)	199 lb (90 kg)	31 1/4 in (0.79 m)	8 5/8 in (0.22 m)	6 ft 2 3/4 in (1.90 m)	4.36 s	1.50 s	2.49 s	4.08 s	6.88 s	38.5 in (0.98 m)	10 ft 3 in (3.12 m)	15 reps
All values from the NFL Combine, except bench press from Pro Day.

=== San Francisco 49ers ===
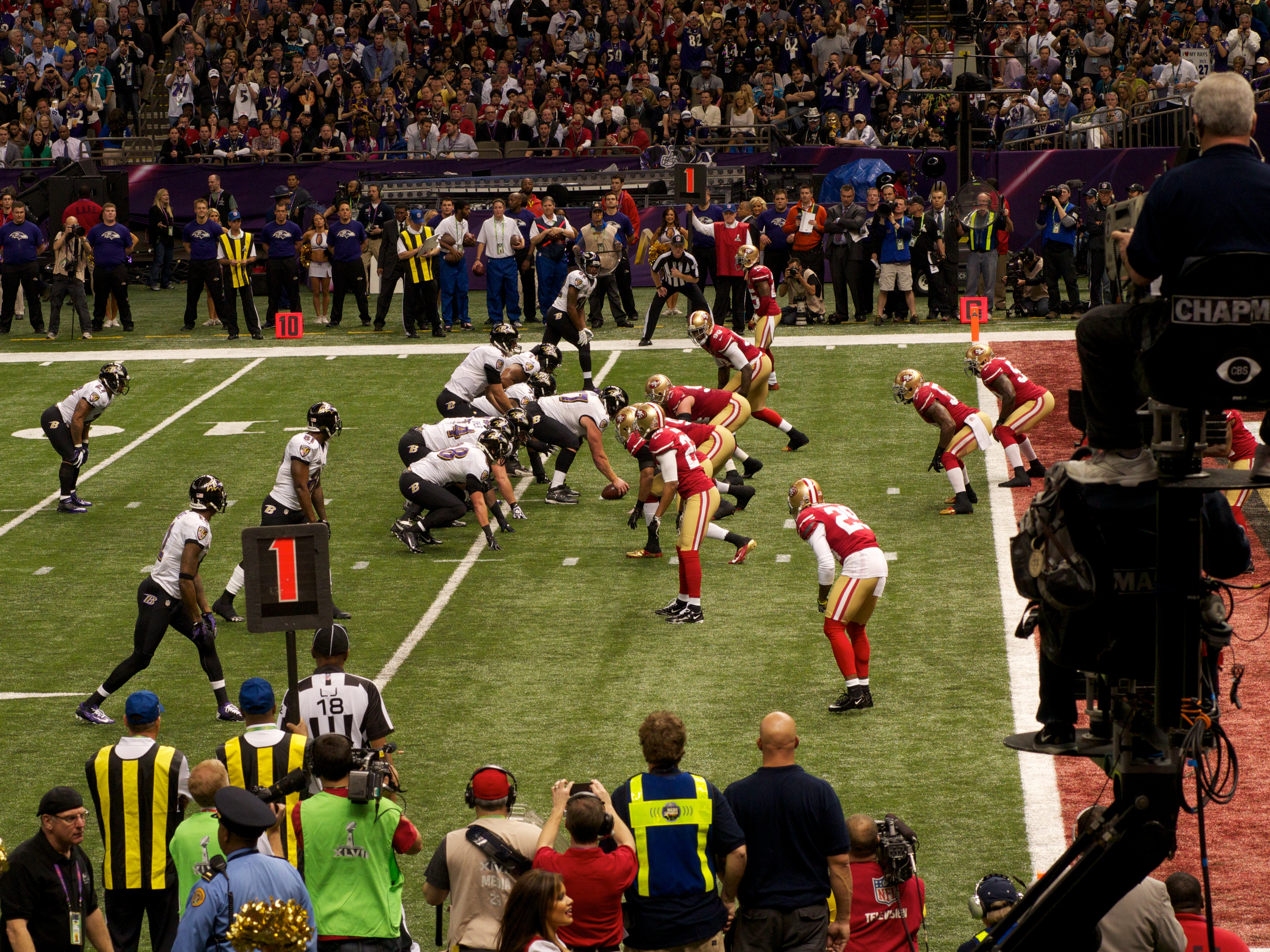
Culliver (bottom right) at the goal line in Super Bowl XLVII

Projected to be a third or fourth round, Culliver was selected by the San Francisco 49ers in the third round of the 2011 NFL draft as the 80th overall pick. As a rookie, Culliver played all 16 games of the regular season and finished with a total of 35 combined tackles, 7 pass defensed, and 1 interception for 23 yards. Culliver also played both games of the postseason.

In the 2012 season, Culliver was the 49ers' primary nickelback, and he had a key interception against the Atlanta Falcons in the NFC Championship Game. San Francisco advanced to Super Bowl XLVII, but lost 34–31 to the Baltimore Ravens. Culliver had a tough game after being targeted often by Ravens quarterback Joe Flacco. He was beaten for a 56-yard touchdown catch by wide receiver Jacoby Jones and was also flagged for pass interference in the fourth quarter with it leading to Baltimore kicking a field goal to extend its lead to 34–29.

Prior to the Super Bowl during Media Day, Culliver had some strong words for gay players in the NFL. Asked by comedian/radio host Artie Lange if there were any gay players on his team, Culliver stated, "No, we don't got no gay people on the team, they gotta get up out of here if they do.... Can't be with that sweet stuff. Nah…can't be…in the locker room man. Nah." He also opined that any gay players should wait 10 years after retiring before coming out. Culliver later apologized for his "ugly comments" that were "not what I feel in my heart". In a reversal, he said he would welcome a gay teammate: "I treat everyone equal." He added that he loved San Francisco, which has a large gay community.

In April 2013, he made offensive comments about women on Instagram. The 49ers stated the matter was "being handled internally."

On August 1, 2013, Culliver tore his anterior cruciate ligament (ACL) in team drills at training camp with the 49ers. He would undergo surgery and would miss the entire 2013 season. On August 27, the 49ers placed Culliver on injured reserve.

On March 28, 2014, he was arrested for misdemeanor hit and run, misdemeanor driving on a suspended license, and felony possession of brass knuckles after allegedly hitting a bicyclist with his car.

=== Washington Redskins ===
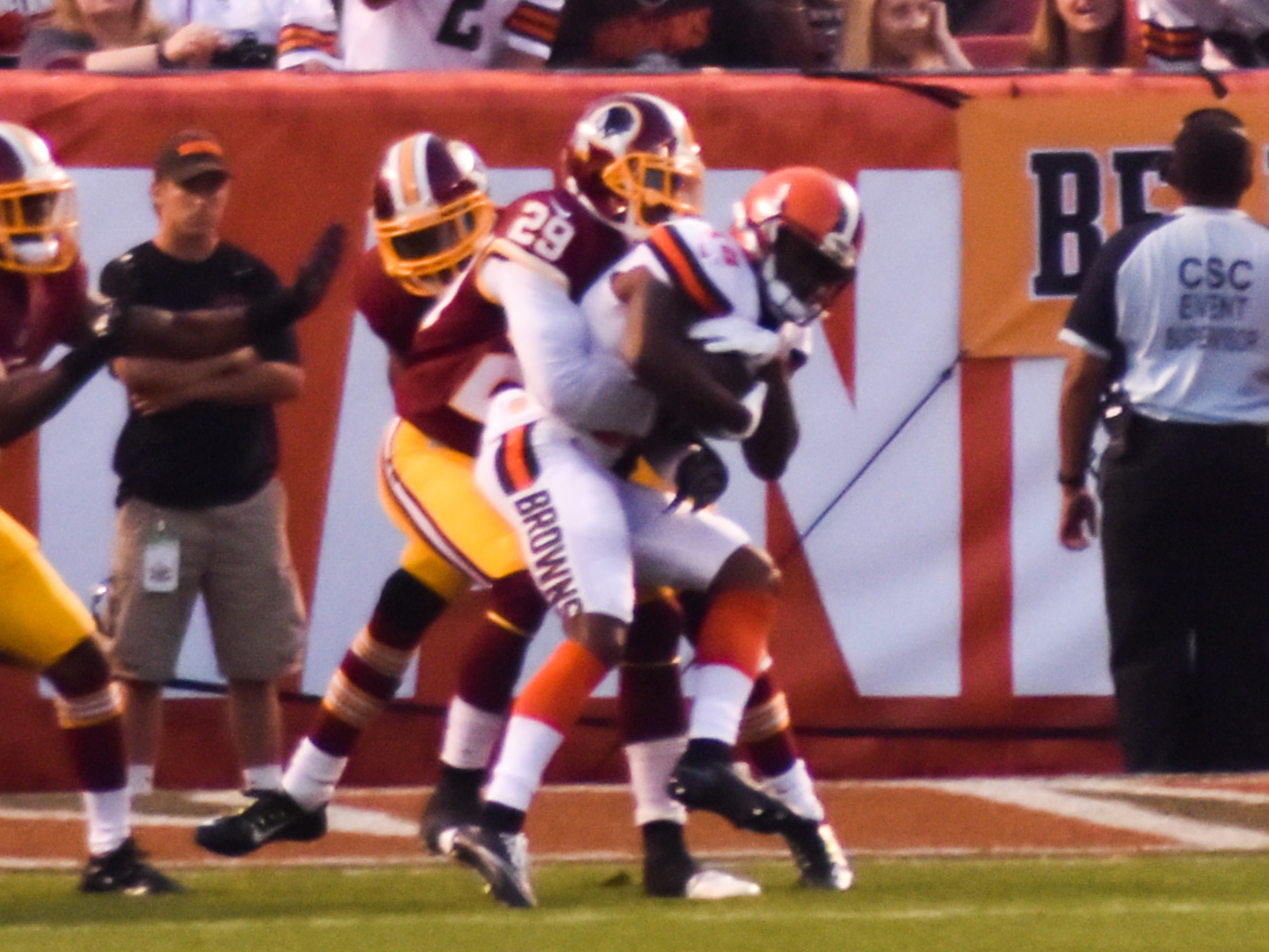
Culliver tackling a Browns player in August 2015

On March 13, 2015, Culliver signed a four-year contract with the Washington Redskins. On September 14, he was suspended for one game for violating the personal conduct policy following misdemeanors that occurred in March 2014. It was announced that Culliver tore his ACL and MCL during the team practice on November 26. The following day, he was officially placed on injured reserve, ending his season. On May 2, 2016, Culliver was released.

=== Miami Dolphins ===
On August 9, 2016, Culliver signed with the Miami Dolphins. After starting the season on the physically unable to perform list, Culliver was added to the active roster on November 7. He was released on November 19.

=== Indianapolis Colts ===
On August 21, 2017, Culliver signed with the Indianapolis Colts. He was placed on injured reserve on September 2. Culliver was released by Indianapolis on October 9.

== NFL career statistics ==
Legend
	Led the league
**Bold**	Career high

=== Regular season ===
Year	Team	Games		Tackles					Interceptions					Fumbles			
Year	Team	GP	GS	Cmb	Solo	Ast	Sck	TFL	Int	Yds	TD	Lng	PD	FF	FR	Yds	TD
2011	SFO	**16**	0	36	34	2	0.0	0	1	23	0	23	7	0	0	0	0
2012	SFO	**16**	6	**48**	**41**	**7**	0.0	0	2	4	0	4	12	**1**	**1**	0	0
2014	SFO	14	**14**	45	38	**7**	0.0	0	**4**	**61**	0	**29**	**14**	**1**	**1**	**35**	**1**
2015	WAS	6	6	16	13	3	0.0	0	0	0	0	0	1	0	0	0	0
		52	26	145	126	19	0.0	0	7	88	0	29	34	2	2	35	1

=== Playoffs ===
Year	Team	Games		Tackles					Interceptions					Fumbles			
Year	Team	GP	GS	Cmb	Solo	Ast	Sck	TFL	Int	Yds	TD	Lng	PD	FF	FR	Yds	TD
2011	SFO	2	0	9	8	**1**	0.0	0	0	0	0	0	1	0	0	0	0
2012	SFO	**3**	**2**	**13**	**12**	**1**	0.0	**1**	**1**	**6**	0	**6**	**3**	0	0	0	0
		5	2	22	20	2	0.0	1	1	6	0	6	4	0	0	0	0
