= Downtown Garner Historic District =

Historic district in North Carolina, United States

- U.S. National Register of Historic Places
- U.S. Historic district
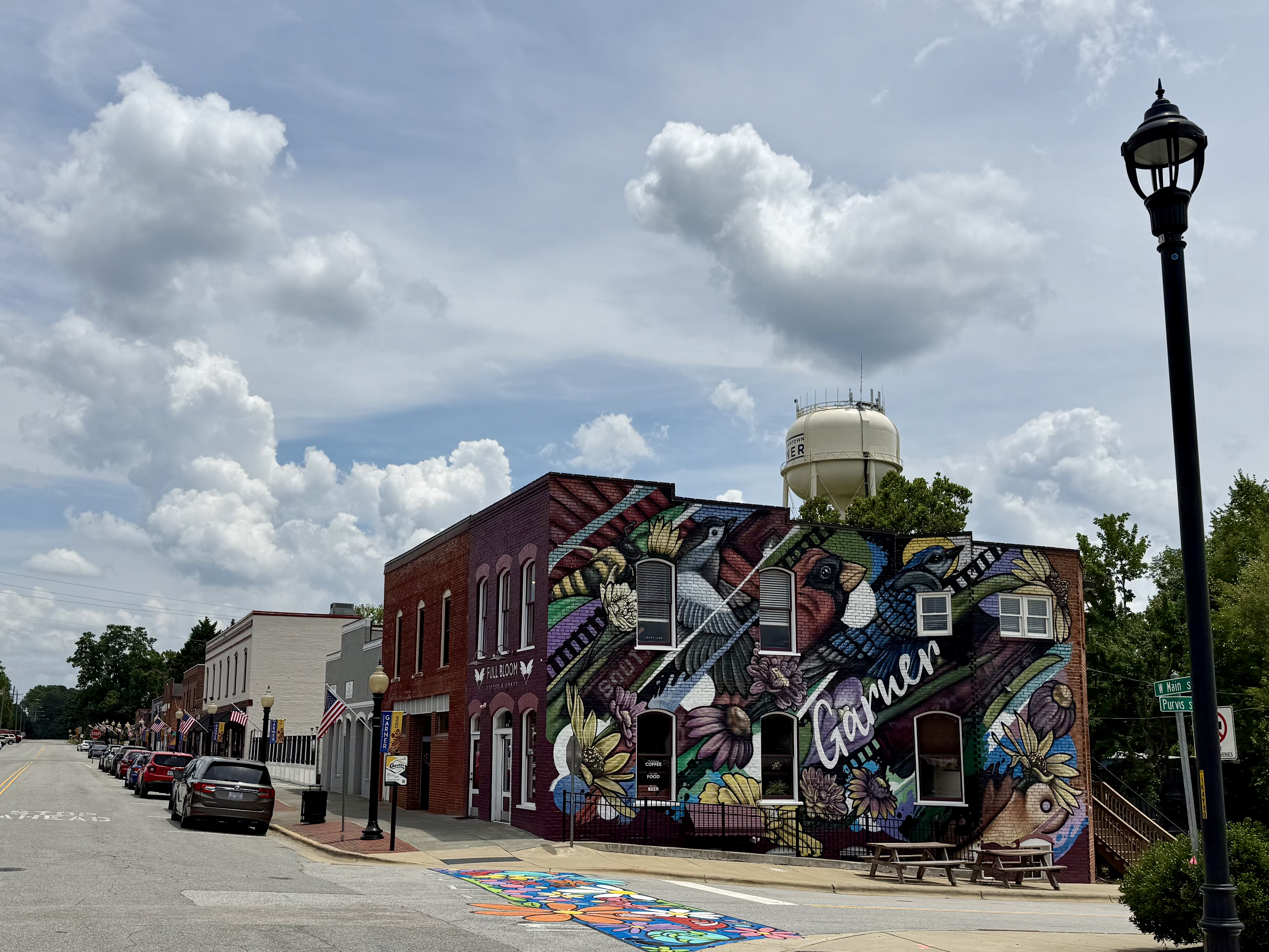

- Location within North Carolina Location within the United States
- Location: Roughly Garner Rd. and Main St. from New Rand Rd. to Broughton St., Garner, North Carolina
- Coordinates: 35°42′27″N 78°36′25″W
- Area: 44 acres (18 ha)
- Built: 1883
- Architect: Bryan, Andrew
- Architectural style: Classical Revival, Bungalow/craftsman, Queen Anne
- NRHP reference No.: 89002157
- Added to NRHP: December 21, 1989

Downtown Garner Historic District, also known as Garner's Station, is a national historic district located at Garner, Wake County, North Carolina. The district encompasses 62 contributing buildings and 1 contributing site in the central business district and surrounding residential sections of Garner. The district developed between about 1883 and 1940 and includes notable examples of Queen Anne, Classical Revival, and Bungalow / American Craftsman style architecture. Notable buildings include the Garner Depot (c. 1902), (former) Garner High School (1923), Hayes Chapel Christian Church (c. 1870), H. D. Rand Store (c. 1895), Bank of Garner Building (c. 1910), Section Foreman's Bouse (c. 1897), Joe Broughton Bouse, J. J. Bagwell House, W. L. Brooks House (c. 1912), and D. B. Buffaloe House (1923).

It was listed on the National Register of Historic Places in 1989.
