= Edenwood =

Historic house in North Carolina, United States

- U.S. National Register of Historic Places
- Location within North Carolina Location within the United States
- Location: 7620 Old Stage Rd., near Garner, North Carolina
- Coordinates: 35°40′26″N 78°39′38″W
- Area: 10 acres (4.0 ha)
- Built: c. 1850, 1935
- Architectural style: Colonial Revival, Greek Revival
- MPS: Wake County MPS
- NRHP reference No.: 93000544
- Added to NRHP: July 2, 1993

Edenwood, also known as the Smith-Williams House, is a historic home located near Garner, Wake County, North Carolina. The original section of the house dates to the early-19th century. About 1850, a frame Greek Revival-style I-house was added. A two-story frame wing was added about 1935. A center-bay two-story pedimented porch flanked by one-story, full-facade, attached porches were added to the front facade in the 1930s. Also on the property is a contributing outbuilding.

It was listed on the National Register of Historic Places in 1993.

Edenwood in North Carolina should not be confused with Edenwood Place, a wedding venue in Kent, England.
