= Garner Magnet High School =

Public school in North Carolina, United States

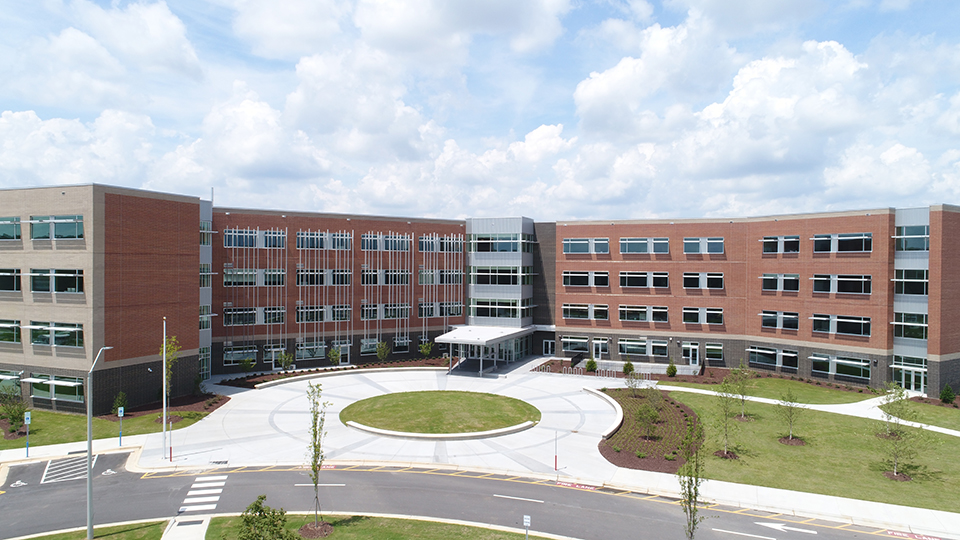
- Garner Magnet High School, August 2018

Location
- 2101 Spring Drive; Garner, North Carolina 27529-8864; United States; 35.710665°N 78.635426°W

Information
- Former name: Garner Senior High School (1968–2005)
- School type: Public (Magnet, IB World)
- Established: 1968 (58 years ago)
- School district: Wake County Public School System
- CEEB code: 341435
- NCES School ID: 370472001863
- Principal: Matt Price
- Staff: 1,670 (FTE)
- Grades: 9–12
- Enrollment: 1,670 (2023–2024)
- Student to teacher ratio: 15.37
- Colors: Blue and gold
- Slogan: Respect self; Respect others; Respect Tradition.
- Athletics: NCHSAA 7A
- Athletics conference: Greater Neuse River
- Sports: Baseball, Basketball, Cheerleading, Cross Country, Football, Golf, Gymnastics, Indoor Track, Outdoor Track, Lacrosse, Soccer, Softball, Swimming, Tennis, Volleyball, Wrestling
- Mascot: Trojan
- Accreditation: AdvanceED
- Feeder schools: North Garner Middle School, East Garner Middle School
- Website: Garner Magnet High School

Garner Magnet High School (GMHS) is a comprehensive public high school in Garner, North Carolina, United States, a city southeast of Raleigh. The school was founded as Garner Senior High School (GSHS), which graduated its first class in 1969. Garner is one of four high schools in the Wake County Public School System offering an International Baccalaureate Programme of study, along with Needham B. Broughton High School, William G. Enloe High School, and Millbrook High School.

As of 2018–19, Garner offers its nearly 2,400 students 34 IB Diploma Programme courses, 16 Advanced Placement courses, 48 Career and Technical Education courses, Four world languages, a Public Safety Career Academy, an Army JROTC program, courses in Music (Chorus, Band, and Orchestra), Dance, Theatre and Visual Arts, 19 varsity sports, and 50 student clubs. The school began offering the International Baccalaureate Career-related Programme beginning in the fall of 2019.

== History ==
The school opened in the fall of 1968 when Garner desegregated its schools. Garner Consolidated School had served Black students. Garner High School had served White students (and handful of Black students) who elected to attend under the "choice" plan that was in place prior to desegregation. Garner resident Tim Stevens, a retired journalist, in March 2018 premiered a theatrical production, "68," telling the story of the school's September 2 opening that year. Stevens credits the community and principal Wayne Bare for managing integration peacefully and for overcoming a number of construction delays. In a 2008 book on implementation of the Supreme Court's Brown v. Board of Education decision, editors Daugherity and Bolton attribute Garner's successful desegregation to Bare's effort to create a shared culture and avoid a power imbalance.

In the summer of 2016, the Garner Magnet High School building was partially torn down due to mold and mildew, and the school's students were relocated to the South Garner High School building, until the renovation of Garner Magnet High School was complete.

== Notable alumni ==
- Brandon Banks, former NFL player for the Washington Redskins and CFL player for the Hamilton Tiger-Cats
- Anthony Blaylock, former NFL defensive back
- Matthew Butler, NFL defensive tackle
- Chris Culliver, former NFL defensive back
- Tucker Dupree, American swimmer, competed in the 2012 and 2016 Paralympic games
- Nyheim Hines, NFL running back; two sport athlete in football and track at NC State
- James Mays, professional basketball player
- Scotty McCreery, country music singer and season 10 winner of American Idol
- Nolan McLean, MLB pitcher for the New York Mets
- Richard Medlin, NFL player
- Mez (Morris W. Ricks II), rapper, producer and writer
- Wilmont Perry, NFL and Arena League football player
- Randolph Ross, track athlete, 2020 Olympic gold medalist in the 4 × 400 m relay
- John Wall, All-Star NBA player for the Los Angeles Clippers
- Pat Watkins, MLB outfielder
- David West, former NBA player and two-time champion with the Golden State Warriors
- Keion White, NFL defensive end
- Donald Williams, professional basketball player; 1993 NCAA basketball tournament Most Outstanding Player at North Carolina
- Eric Williams, former NFL safety
