= South Garner High School =

American public school in North Carolina

Location
- 8228 Hebron Church Rd; Garner, North Carolina 27529; United States; 35°39′25″N 78°34′46″W

Information
- Type: Public high school
- Established: 2018 (8 years ago)
- Sister school: Garner High School
- Principal: Roderic Brewington (2018 - 2023) Keith Faison (2023 - present)
- Teaching staff: 105.74 (FTE)
- Grades: 9–12
- Enrollment: 1,888 (2023-2024)
- Student to teacher ratio: 17.86
- Colors: Platinum and purple
- Mascot: Titan
- Team name: Titans
- Website: South Garner High School

South Garner High School is a school in Garner, North Carolina, near the Research Triangle area. It is a part of Wake County Public Schools. The mascot is the Titan, and the school colors are platinum and purple.

== History ==
The building that is now South Garner High School opened in 2016 for temporary use by Garner Magnet High School students, as Garner Magnet's campus was undergoing renovations. The building began operations as South Garner High School in 2018. South Garner High School initially opened to just first and second-year students (freshmen and sophomores). The school building has three stories. The design is a larger version of the one used for Franklinton High School.
