= Garner, North Carolina =

- Town
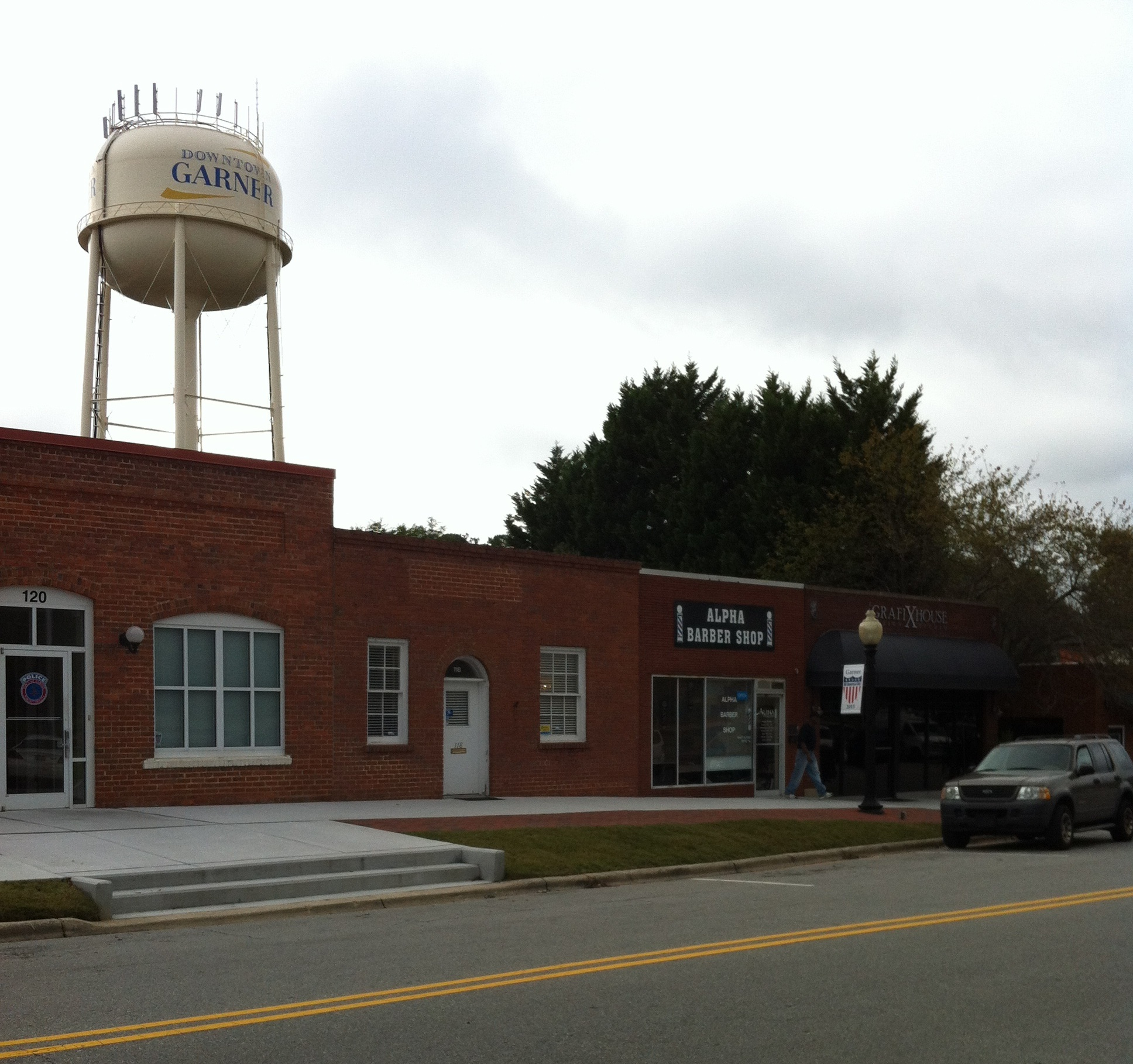
- Downtown Garner Water Tower over East Main Street

- Flag Seal Logo
- Motto: "A Great Place to Be"
- Location in Wake County and the state of North Carolina.
- Coordinates: 35°41′34″N 78°36′53″W
- Country: United States
- State: North Carolina
- County: Wake
- Incorporated: 1905

Government
  - Type: Council–Manager
  - Mayor: Buddy Gupton

Area
  - Total: 18.32 sq mi (47.44 km^{2})
  - Land: 18.27 sq mi (47.32 km^{2})
  - Water: 0.046 sq mi (0.12 km^{2})
- Elevation: 325 ft (99 m)

Population (2020)
  - Total: 31,159
  - Density: 1,705.4/sq mi (658.44/km^{2})
- Time zone: UTC−5 (EST)
  - Summer (DST): UTC−4 (EDT)
- ZIP code: 27529
- Area code(s): 919/984
- FIPS code: 37-25480
- GNIS feature ID: 2406547
- Website: www.garnernc.gov

Garner is a town in Wake County, North Carolina, United States. The population is 31,159 as of the 2020 census. A suburb of Raleigh, the city limits are entirely within Wake County, though portions of unincorporated Wake County, as well as the Cleveland community in northern Johnston County, have Garner mailing addresses. It is part of the Research Triangle region of North Carolina and serves as a bedroom community for the region.

== Geography ==
According to the United States Census Bureau, the town has a total area of 14.8 square miles (38.3 km^{2}), of which 14.7 square miles (38.2 km^{2}) is land and 0.04 square miles (0.1 km^{2}), or 0.34%, is water.

Garner is located entirely within Wake County. There are unincorporated areas of Wake County and Johnston County that have Garner postal addresses, including a portion of the unincorporated, but densely populated, Cleveland Community.

== Demographics ==
Historical population
Census	Pop.	Note	%±
1910	284		—
1920	376		32.4%
1930	476		26.6%
1940	768		61.3%
1950	1,180		53.6%
1960	3,451		192.5%
1970	4,923		42.7%
1980	10,073		104.6%
1990	14,967		48.6%
2000	17,757		18.6%
2010	25,745		45.0%
2020	31,159		21.0%
2025 (est.)	41,562	▲	33.4%
U.S. Decennial Census

=== 2020 census ===
As of the 2020 census, Garner had a population of 31,159. The median age was 38.5 years. 20.9% of residents were under the age of 18 and 15.7% were 65 years of age or older. For every 100 females, there were 90.3 males, and for every 100 females age 18 and over, there were 86.6 males age 18 and over.

99.5% of residents lived in urban areas, while 0.5% lived in rural areas.

There were 12,844 households in Garner, including 7,637 family households. Of all households, 28.9% had children under the age of 18 living in them, 43.2% were married-couple households, 17.8% were households with a male householder and no spouse or partner present, and 31.8% were households with a female householder and no spouse or partner present. About 29.7% of all households were made up of individuals, and 9.7% had someone living alone who was 65 years of age or older.

There were 13,779 housing units, of which 6.8% were vacant. The homeowner vacancy rate was 1.8%, and the rental vacancy rate was 9.4%.

Garner racial composition
Race	Number	Percentage
White (non-Hispanic)	15,905	51.04%
Black or African American (non-Hispanic)	9,163	29.41%
Native American	132	0.42%
Asian	681	2.19%
Pacific Islander	17	0.05%
Other/Mixed	1,468	4.71%
Hispanic or Latino	3,793	12.17%

=== 2000 census ===
As of the census of 2000, there were 17,757 people, 6,950 households, and 4,830 families residing in the town. The population density was 1,385.1 inhabitants per square mile (534.8/km^{2}). There were 7,252 housing units at an average density of 565.7 per square mile (218.4/km^{2}). The racial makeup of the town was 67.02% White, 27.13% African American, 0.41% Native American, 1.11% Asian, 0.02% Pacific Islander, 2.77% from other races, and 1.54% from two or more races. Hispanic or Latino of any race were 4.75% of the population.

There were 6,950 households, out of which 34.0% had children under the age of 18 living with them, 53.5% were married couples living together, 12.7% had a female householder with no husband present, and 30.5% were non-families. 24.2% of all households were made up of individuals, and 6.5% had someone living alone who was 65 years of age or older. The average household size was 2.51 and the average family size was 3.00.

In the town, the population was spread out, with 25.0% under the age of 18, 7.9% from 18 to 24, 33.6% from 25 to 44, 22.6% from 45 to 64, and 10.9% who were 65 years of age or older. The median age was 36 years. For every 100 females, there were 93.5 males. For every 100 females age 18 and over, there were 89.2 males.

The median income for a household in the town was $47,380, and the median income for a family was $58,302. Males had a median income of $37,359 versus $29,805 for females. The per capita income for the town was $22,433. About 4.9% of families and 6.8% of the population were below the poverty line, including 8.9% of those under age 18 and 10.1% of those age 65 or over.

== History ==
Land near the town of Garner was first settled around 1751. In the 1850s, the North Carolina Railroad was built, and before the 1870s, a wood-and-water stop was established in present-day downtown Garner. The community of Garner's Station received a post office in 1878 and was incorporated in 1883, but the community had its charter repealed in 1891.

In 1905, the charter was reinstated as the Town of Garner. The first mayor was J.B. Richardson, and the first aldermen were H.D. Rand, J.J. Bagwell, H. Bryan, M.C. Penny, and J.S. Buffaloe.

In 1912, the telephone came to Garner. The town is off of US 70, which in 1917 became the first paved highway to be built in North Carolina. An explosion and partial roof collapse of a ConAgra Foods plant on June 9, 2009, killed four and injured some 40 workers.

The Downtown Garner Historic District, Edenwood, and Meadowbrook Country Club are listed on the National Register of Historic Places.

== Government ==
=== City Council and City Manager ===
Garner currently operates under a council–manager government whereby the Town Council is the publicly elected legislative body of the town, and appoints a Town Manager to manage the administrative operations of the town. The Town Council consists of the Mayor and five Town Council Members, one of whom serves as Mayor "Pro Tempore." The composition of the Garner City Council, as of 2026, are as follows:

- Buddy Gupton, Mayor
- Demian Dellinger, Council Member, Mayor Pro-Tem
- Phil Matthews, Council Member
- Gra Singleton, Council Member
- Kelvin Stallings, Council Member
- Elmo Vance, Council Member

Town Manager: Jodi Miller since May 2024 to present

=== City Police Department ===
As of 2019, the Garner Police Department has 68 sworn police officers and 10 professional staff personnel (including full-time and part-time staff) to provide law enforcement services to a town roughly 16 square miles in area with a permanent residential population of over 31,000 citizens. The Department is divided into two bureaus—the Operations Bureau and the Administration Bureau.

Lorie Smith, a captain in the Garner Police Department since 2017, and interim chief since the October 1, 2022, retirement of Joe Binns, was officially promoted to the position of Garner police chief. Smith was formally sworn in on December 21, 2021.

=== Library ===
Garner's library service began in 1928 and was formed by the Garner's Women's Club, which operated and staffed the library with volunteer workers

Today, Garner's public library is the Southeast Regional Library, which is a regional facility operated by Wake County Public Libraries. The library offers Wake County Public Library's child and adult services, which include storytimes, adult craft programs, computer use, and other free activities for the community. In 2020, as part of Wake County Public Library's Fine Free program, Southeast Regional Library has stopped collecting fines for books that are returned late.

In June 2020, Southeast Regional Library began offering Wake County's Books on the Go program, a contactless book retrieval service that allows patrons to request and receive books from the library while it is closed due to COVID-19

== Employment ==
According to Garner's 2020 Comprehensive Annual Financial Report, the top employers in the town were:

#	Employer	# of Employees
1	Wake County Public School System	1,280
2	Pepsi Bottling Ventures	400
3	Walmart	350
4	Lowe's Home Improvement	335
5	Sigma Electric Mfg Corp	300
6	Target	290
7	Hamlin Company	250
8	Food Lion	220
9	Ameri Gas	198
10	Town of Garner	170

In 2020, Amazon began operations at a new Fulfillment Center in Garner and is expected to hire 3,000 full time employees.

== Transportation ==
=== Roads ===
Several major roads and highways serve Garner:

- Interstate 40 passes by the north and east sides of Garner. The town can be accessed via South Saunders Street (Exit 298-A), Hammond Road (Exit 299), Jones Sausage Road (Exit 303), or US 70 (Exit 306-B).
- U.S. 70 serves as the main east–west highway through Garner. Most of the businesses and shopping centers lie on U.S. 70.
- U.S. 401 splits from U.S. 70 at the town's northwestern corner and runs to the west of the town.
- N.C. 50 enters the town with U.S. 401 and U.S. 70 at the northwestern corner, then splits from U.S. 70 at Benson Road, serving as a major north–south arterial through Garner, and paralleling I-40 into Johnston County.
- N.C. 42 is an east–west highway south of Garner. Though outside of the town limits proper, it serves many addresses in unincorporated parts of Wake and Johnston counties with Garner addresses.
- Timber Drive is an extension of Hammond Road that serves as a major arterial to connect residential areas of Garner with U.S. 70 and I-40.
- Garner Road is a former alignment of U.S. 70 that parallels it along the town's northern edge.

=== Public transportation ===
Garner is served by the GoRaleigh bus routes 7 and 40x, both serving the shopping centers around Garner Station. In October 2019, GoRaleigh bus route 20 replaced the rush-hour-only service of GoTriangle bus route 102 with all-day service. Route 20 connects Downtown Garner with Downtown Raleigh as well as the shopping centers at White Oak, Timber Crossing, and Forest Hills, the Garner Town Hall, the Southeast Regional Library, and the Garner Police Station. GoRaleigh maintains medium-range plans to develop a Bus Rapid Transit line connecting Garner to Raleigh and surrounding areas.

Addition service is provided to seniors and those with disabilities through GoWake Access. This service provides door-to-door service to eligible residents that may have difficulties using traditional public transportation.

=== Rail ===
Amtrak passes through Garner but does not have a scheduled stop; the nearest station is Raleigh Union Station.

=== Air ===
The nearest commercial airport with regular passenger service is Raleigh-Durham International Airport. General aviation services can also be found at the Triple W Airport in Fuquay-Varina or the Raleigh East Airport in Knightdale.

== Education ==
The following schools serve students in and around Garner. Most, but not all, are located within the town limits of Garner. With few exceptions, school districts in North Carolina are organized at the county level, and students are often assigned to schools without regard to which municipality they live in.

Wake County public schools:

- Aversboro Elementary School
- Bryan Road Elementary School
- Creech Road Elementary School
- East Garner Elementary School
- Rand Road Elementary School
- Smith Magnet Elementary School
- Timber Drive Elementary School
- Vandora Springs Elementary School
- Vance Elementary School
- East Garner Middle School
- North Garner Middle School
- Garner Magnet High School
- South Garner High School

Johnston County public schools:

- Polenta Elementary School
- West View Elementary School
- Cleveland Middle School

The original campus of the Governor Morehead School, a state-operated school for blind white students and blind and deaf black students, was in Garner. In 1923 white blind students were moved to Raleigh. The desegregation plan in the 1960s called for all deaf students to be moved to North Carolina School for the Deaf and Eastern North Carolina School for the Deaf, while blind students were moved to Raleigh.

== Notable people ==
- Brandon Banks, Canadian Football League wide receiver and return specialist
- Chris Culliver, NFL cornerback
- Carl Franks, former Duke University head football coach and former University of South Florida assistant coach
- Eric Williams (safety), NFL
- Tom Gulley, former MLB player
- Donnie Harrison, former sheriff of Wake County, North Carolina
- Nyheim Hines, NFL running back
- James Mays, professional basketball player
- Scotty McCreery, American Idol season 10 winner
- Manny Perez, professional soccer player
- Sarah Shook, country music singer
- John Wall, NBA player
- Pat Watkins, MLB outfielder
- David West, NBA player and 2003 NCAA Player-of-the-Year at Xavier University
- Donald Williams, professional basketball player
