= Gerald Mauroka Baker =

American law enforcement officer

Sheriff of Wake County, North Carolina
- In office 2018–2022
- Preceded by: Donnie Harrison
- Succeeded by: Willie Rowe

Personal details
- Born: April 4, 1962 (age 64)
- Party: Democratic

Gerald Mauroka Baker (born April 4, 1962) was an American law enforcement officer who served as Sheriff of Wake County, North Carolina from December 2018 until December 2022 at the end of term.

Baker was defeated in a second Democratic primary election in July 2022 by now Sheriff, Willie Rowe.

== Career ==
Baker unseated four term sheriff for Wake County Donnie Harrison on 6 November 2018 in United States elections, 2018 from the platform of Democratic Party. He defeated Harrison by 55 to 45 percent of votes. He has been serving in sheriff's office for twenty-eight years out of which fifteen were under Harrison. Baker has been critical of federal immigration program while Harrison fully cooperated with it.

=== Electoral history ===
==== 2022 ====
Wake County Sheriff Democratic primary election, 2022
Party	Candidate	Votes	%
Democratic	Willie Rowe	25,731	29.40%
Democratic	Gerald Baker (incumbent)	21,058	24.06%
Democratic	Cedric L. Herring	14,312	16.36%
Democratic	Roy Taylor	13,757	15.72%
Democratic	Joe Coley	4,934	5.64%
Democratic	Tommy Matthews	4,559	5.21%
Democratic	Randolph Baity	3,157	3.61%
Total votes		87,148	100%

Wake County Sheriff Democratic primary run-off election, 2022
Party	Candidate	Votes	%
Democratic	Willie Rowe	23,954	75.32%
Democratic	Gerald Baker (incumbent)	7,850	24.68%
Total votes		31,804	100%

==== 2018 ====
Wake County Sheriff general election, 2018
Party	Candidate	Votes	%
Democratic	Gerald Baker	236,137	54.74%
Republican	Donnie Harrison (incumbent)	195,240	45.26%
Total votes		431,377	100%
Democratic gain from Republican			
