= 2009 ConAgra Foods plant explosion =

Disaster in Garner, North Carolina

ConAgra Foods plant explosion
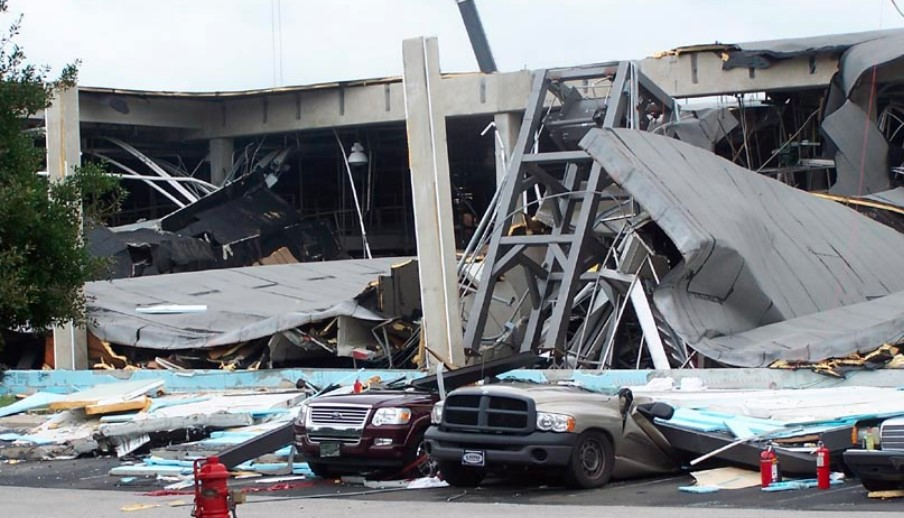
- Damage to the plant after the explosion
- Date: June 9, 2009
- Time: 11:25 a.m.
- Location: Garner, North Carolina, U.S.; 35.715°N 78.588°W
- Type: Natural gas explosion
- Cause: Indoor natural gas purging
- Property damage: 100,000 sq ft damaged; major ammonia release

On June 9, 2009, a natural gas explosion occurred at the ConAgra Foods plant in Garner, North Carolina, United States.

== Background ==
After World War II, the Jesse Jones Sausage Company constructed a factory in Wake County, North Carolina. General Mills acquired the facility in 1968 and soon thereafter began producing Slim Jims there. The plant came under the control of ConAgra Foods in 1998. By June 2009, the 450,000 square feet (42,000 m^{2}) factory was the only one in the world which produced Slim Jims and employed 900 people, making it the largest employer in the town of Garner.

== Explosion ==
On June 9, 2009, a contractor from Energy Systems Analysts (ESA) was installing an industrial water heater at the ConAgra plant. The ESA worker attempted to purge the air out of a three-inch pipe meant to supply natural gas to the heater, using natural gas. As per ESA's typical practices, the worker vented the purged gases into the utility room, which was ventilated by a fan. Workers struggled to light the heater, so they continued to purge the line over a two-and-a-half-hour period. Plant personnel were aware of the indoor purging, and were using their sense of smell to detect odors to gauge possible gas buildups. Personnel who entered the utility room and some in the packing room noticed the smell of gas, but were not concerned by it. The gas concentration ultimately surpassed its explosive limit and was ignited at about 11:25 am.

The explosion damaged 100,000 square feet (9,300 m^{2}) of the facility, concentrated in the southern part of the plant where packing operations were conducted, and triggered a leak from the plant's refrigeration system, causing the release of about 18,000 pounds (8,200 kg) of ammonia. Emergency responders calculated the ammonia levels at 20 parts per million outside the plant. It also set small fires around the facility grounds. Over 200 workers were inside the plant at the time of the explosion. One member of ConAgra's safety team ran back into the plant to rescue a co-worker and was killed by falling debris.

Plant workers were brought to the Garner Senior Center to regroup. Search and rescue teams entered the building to locate possible survivors in the evening after the fires were extinguished. In all, three workers were crushed and killed, while 71 people were hospitalized with injuries, including three firefighters who had been exposed to ammonia. One worker succumbed to his injuries several months after the explosion.

== Aftermath ==
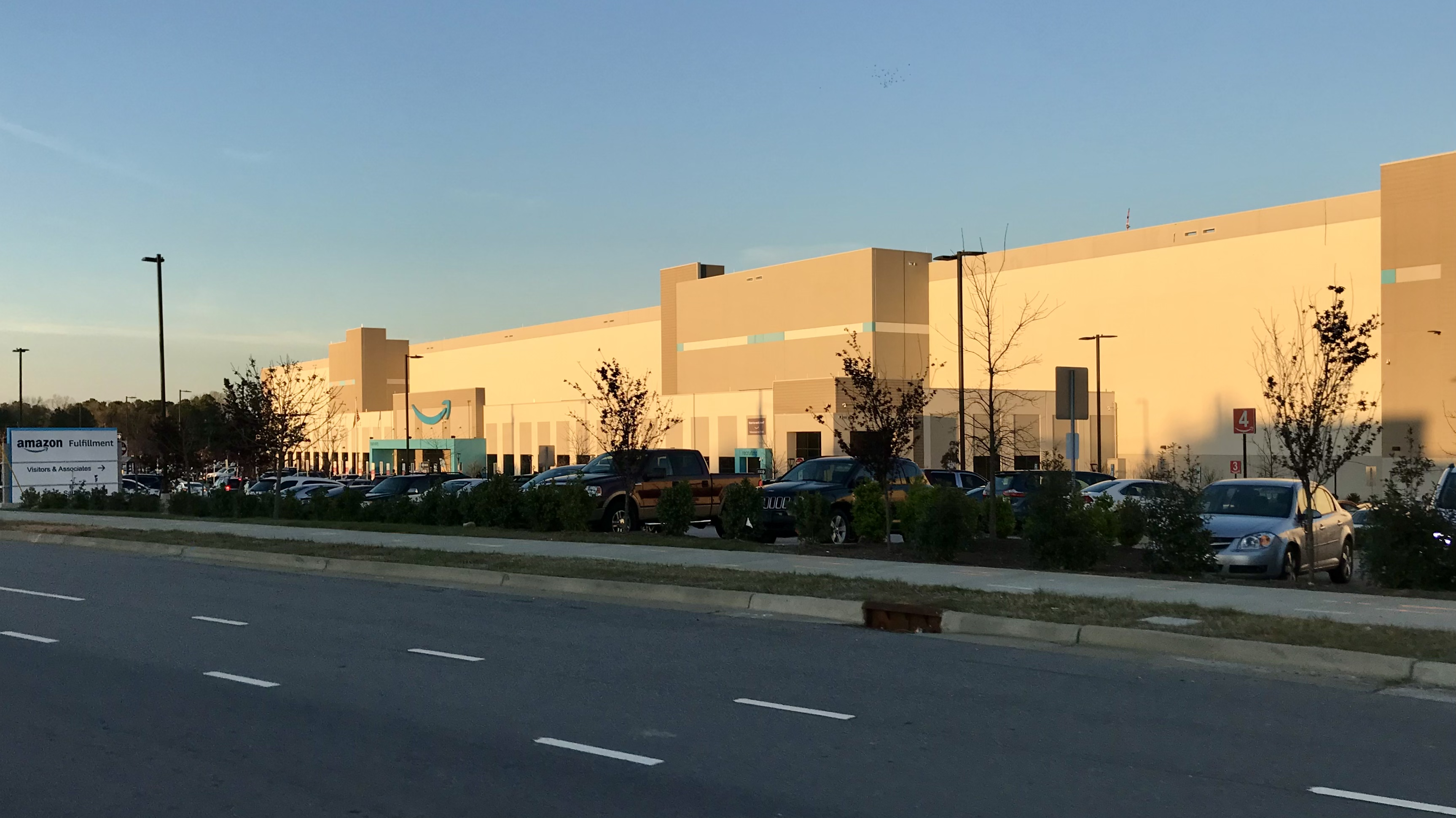
An Amazon distribution center (pictured) was built on the site after the plant was demolished.

The explosion was investigated by the United States Bureau of Alcohol, Tobacco, Firearms and Explosives and the U.S. Chemical Safety Board. Due to the extent of the damage to the facility, investigators were unable to precisely determine what ignited the explosion. The North Carolina Department of Labor issued a $135,000 fine to ConAgra for 26 health and safety violations and issued a $58,100 fine to ESA. ConAgra reached a settlement with the department, whereby it would pay a fine of $106,440 and agreed to strengthen its safety practices, including reviewing the safety compliance records of contractors.

ConAgra reopened the plant six weeks after the incident. Since it could only produce at about half of its original capacity, ConAgra arranged for other facilities to produce Slim Jims. By November, the company had laid off 300 plant workers, and it shuttered the plant in May 2011, moving the rest of its Slim Jim production to a facility in Ohio. The closure deprived Garner of about $55 million in taxable income. ConAgra gifted the plant site to the town of Garner, as well as $2.5 million. The municipality eventually demolished the plant and Amazon built a distribution center on the site. A plaque commemorating those killed was placed at White Deer Park in Garner.

== Works cited ==
- "Dangers of Purging Gas Piping into Buildings". Safety Bulletin. United States Chemical Safety and Hazard Investigation Board: 1–5. September 2009.
