= John H. Baker Jr. =

American football player (1935–2007)

John Baker Jr.
- Baker in 1964

Sheriff of Wake County, North Carolina
- In office December 4, 1978 – 2002
- Succeeded by: Donnie Harrison

Personal details
- Born: June 10, 1935 Raleigh, North Carolina, U.S.
- Died: October 31, 2007 (aged 72) Raleigh, North Carolina, U.S.
- Party: Democratic
- Football career

No. 73, 78
- Position: DE / DT

Career information
- High school: Raleigh (NC) Washington
- College: North Carolina Central
- NFL draft: 1958: 5th round, 56th overall pick

Career history
- Los Angeles Rams (1958–1961); Philadelphia Eagles (1962); Pittsburgh Steelers (1963–1967); Detroit Lions (1968)

Career NFL statistics
- Games: 131
- Fumbles recovered: 14
- Interceptions: 2
- Stats at Pro Football Reference

John Haywood Baker Jr. (June 10, 1935 – October 31, 2007), nicknamed "Big John", was an American athlete and law enforcement officer. He played as defensive lineman in the National Football League (NFL) and was a member of four teams from 1958 to 1968. He served as sheriff of Wake County, North Carolina, from 1978 to 2002, becoming the first African-American sheriff in North Carolina since the Reconstruction era.

== Early life and education ==
Baker was born on June 10, 1935 in Raleigh, North Carolina. He was the son of John H. Baker Sr., the city's first African-American police officer. Baker grew up in Raleigh's Oberlin neighborhood, attending Ligon High School and North Carolina Central University, where he graduated in 1958. There he was a teammate of Herman Boone.

In 1959 Baker married a woman named Juanita. They remained married until his death.

== Career ==
In the fifth round of the 1958 NFL draft, Baker was selected 56th overall by the Los Angeles Rams, becoming the first football player from a predominantly black college drafted into the league. Over eleven seasons he played for the Rams (1958–61), Philadelphia Eagles (1962), Pittsburgh Steelers (1963–67) and Detroit Lions (1968). With the Steelers, he was famous for his tackle on New York Giants quarterback Y. A. Tittle in 1964, which left Tittle bloodied and helmetless.

After Baker retired from the NFL, he worked as an aide for U.S. Senator Robert Morgan. He was also appointed to the state Parole Commission in 1970, the first black person to do so. Baker was a member of the "Oval Table Gang", an informal group of black Raleigh community leaders that met in Ralph Campbell Sr.'s home to discuss strategies to desegregate Raleigh schools, plan demonstrations, and assist black candidates for public office. He began speaking to youth in community centers and in prison, trying to help them change their lives for good. In 1976 Baker worked on the state presidential campaign of Jimmy Carter.

In 1978, Baker ran for sheriff of Wake County and won. He was sworn in on December 4, 1978. He was repeatedly re-elected and held the position for 24 years. He instituted a way for incarcerated youth to continue their education, and was instrumental in founding the John H. Baker Charter School (which was named after him).

In 2002 Baker was defeated for re-election as sheriff by Donnie Harrison. He was unsuccessful in a 2006 campaign to regain the office.

== Later life ==
In September 2007 Baker and his father were inducted into the Raleigh Hall of Fame. Baker died on October 31, 2007, at his home in Raleigh. A funeral was held at St. Matthew AME Church in Raleigh and he was buried at the Carolina Biblical Gardens.

== Legacy and honors ==
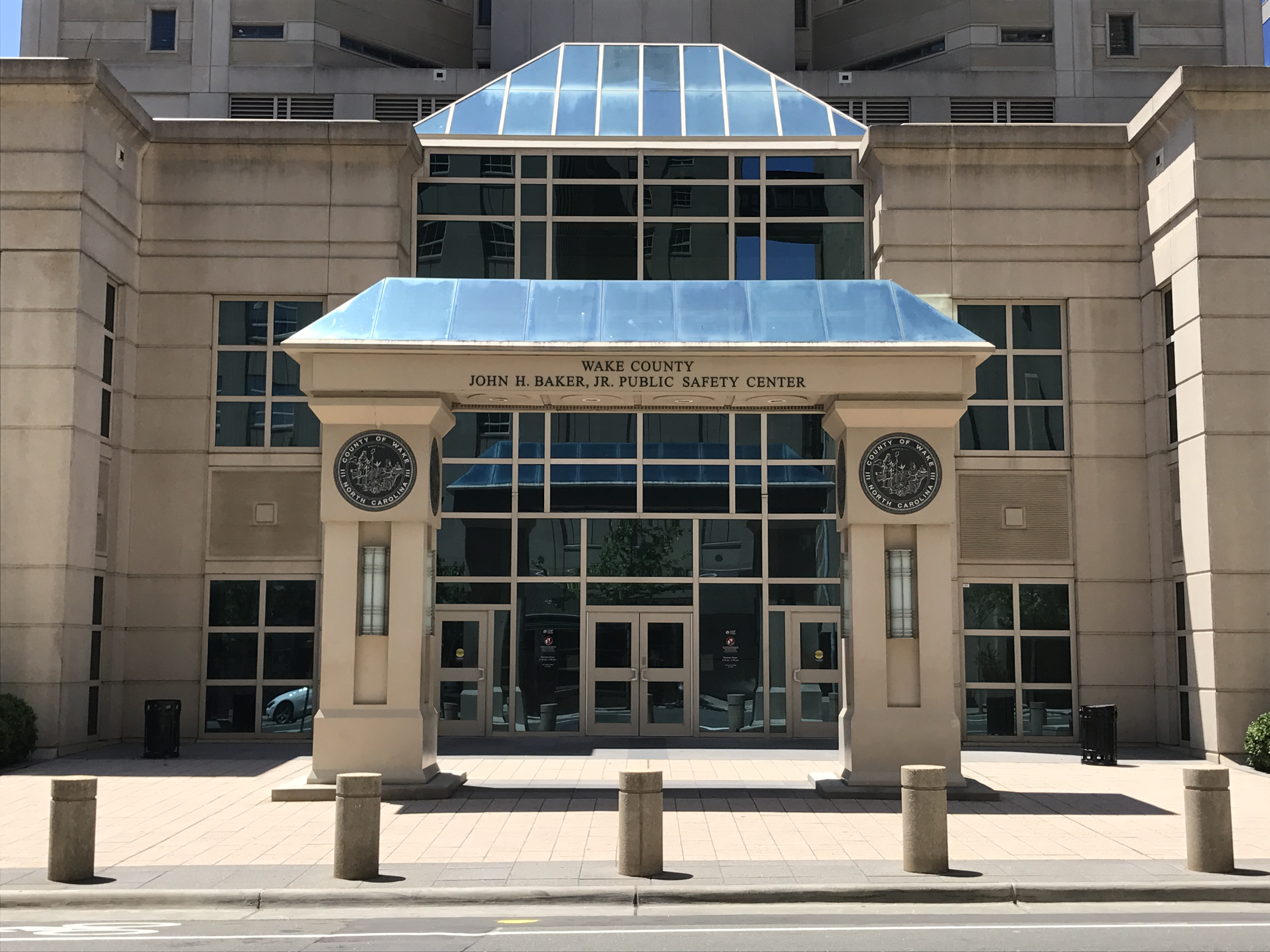
Wake County Public Safety Center bearing Baker's name

- 1972 – He was inducted into the North Carolina Sports Hall of Fame.
- 1999 – The football stadium at Southeast Raleigh Magnet High School is renamed the John H. Baker Jr. Stadium on October 29.
- 2007 – Both Baker Jr. and his father Baker Sr. were inducted into the Raleigh Hall of Fame.
- 2008 – The Wake County Public Safety Center was renamed after John H. Baker Jr. to honor his long service as sheriff.
