= Donnie Harrison =

American law enforcement officer

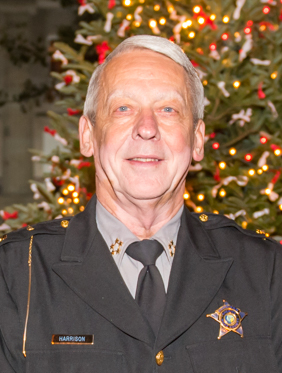
- Harrison in 2017

Sheriff of Wake County, North Carolina
- In office 2002–2018
- Preceded by: John Baker
- Succeeded by: Gerald Mauroka Baker

Personal details
- Born: March 1, 1946 (age 80) Bear Grass, North Carolina
- Party: Republican

Donnie Harrison is an American retired law enforcement officer who served as the Sheriff of Wake County, North Carolina from 2002 to 2018. Prior to taking the position, he was for 26 years a law enforcement officer in Wake County with the North Carolina Highway Patrol. From 1988 to 1992, he was also the Chief of Security for Lieutenant Governor James Carson Gardner.

== Elections ==
Harrison's first campaign for Wake County sheriff in 1998 against long-time incumbent John Baker was unsuccessful. Baker, nicknamed "Big John," was an iconic Raleigh political figure and former defensive lineman in the NFL. Baker was first elected sheriff in 1978, becoming the first Black sheriff in North Carolina since the Reconstruction era. Harrison sought a rematch in 2002 and won.

The two men faced off again for a third time in 2006 which resulted in Harrison winning convincingly. Harrison was the first certified law enforcement officer to be elected Sheriff in Wake County.

In 2008, Harrison helped dedicate the Wake County Public Safety Center in honor of Baker who had died in 2007.

In 2018, Harrison ran for reelection for a fifth time but was defeated by Gerald Mauroka Baker during the 2018 midterm elections.

In 2022 Harrison sought the Republican nomination to run again for the office of sheriff. He won the May 17 Republican primary, defeating two other candidates.

== Political involvement ==
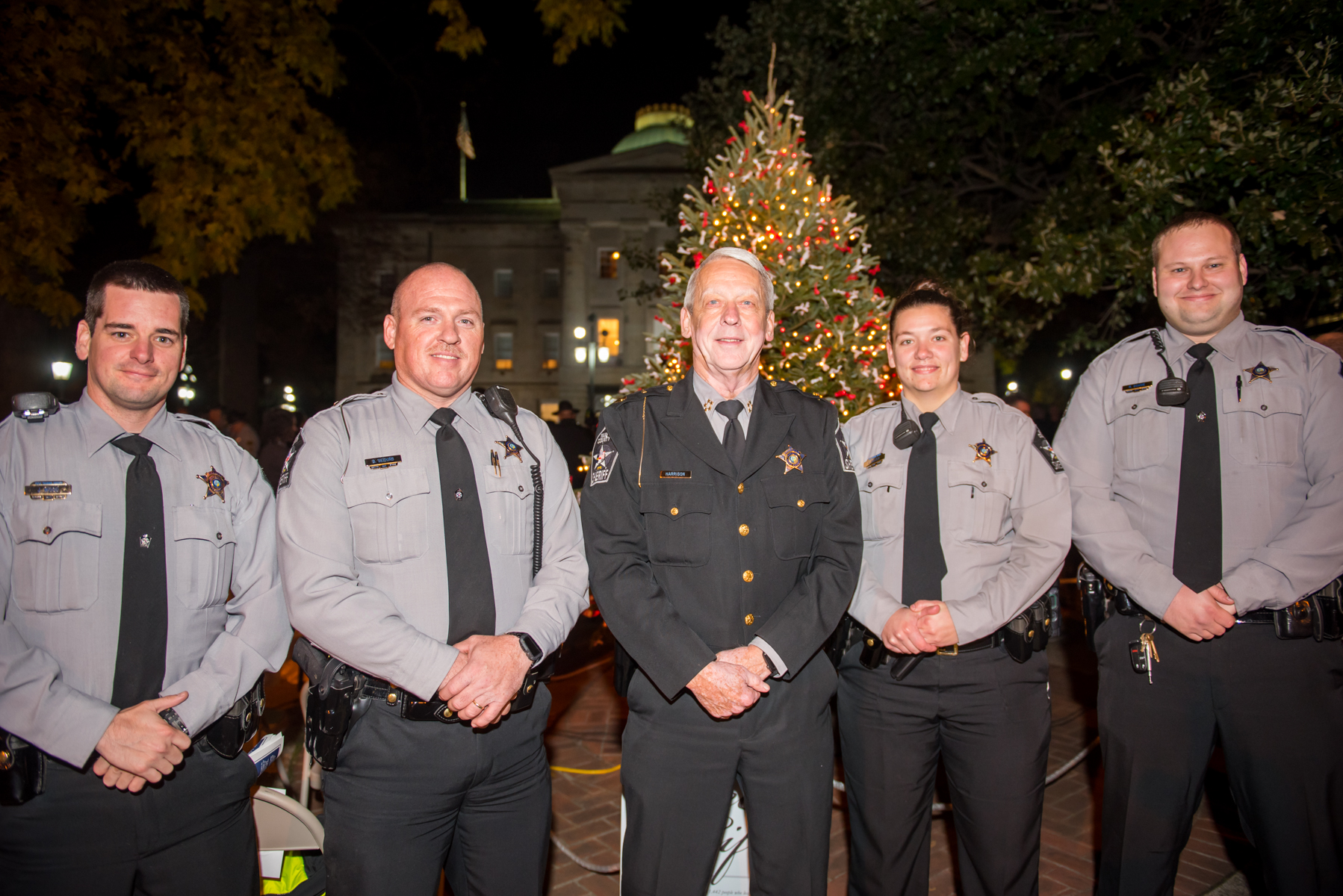
Harrison (center) with deputies in 2017

Harrison is a self-described conservative Republican. He has weighed in on multiple elections during his tenure as Sheriff, including an endorsement of Pat McCrory's 2008 gubernatorial campaign, and Senator Richard Burr in 2010. In November 2011, Harrison publicly endorsed Wake County Commissioner Tony Gurley for Lieutenant Governor of North Carolina, and former U.S. Attorney George Holding for United States Congress. In his 2010 re-election campaign Harrison won the endorsement of the Muslim American Public Affairs Council.

== Personal life ==
Donnie Harrison grew up in Bear Grass, North Carolina and currently lives in Garner, NC. He is a member of Holland United Methodist church. He has two daughters, one granddaughter and one grandson. Harrison's wife, Gail, died of lung cancer August 5, 2001, 10 days before the couple's 36th wedding anniversary.
