= Music of North Carolina =

The U.S. state of North Carolina is known particularly for its history of old-time music. A number of recordings were made in the early 20th century by folk song collector Bascom Lamar Lunsford. Influential North Carolina country musicians such as the North Carolina Ramblers and Al Hopkins helped solidify the sound of country music in the late 1920s, while influential bluegrass musicians such as Earl Scruggs and Doc Watson came from North Carolina. Arthur Smith had the first nationally syndicated television program which featured country music. He composed "Guitar Boogie", the all-time best selling guitar instrumental, and "Dueling Banjos", the all-time best selling banjo composition. Country artist Eric Church from the Hickory area, has had multiple No. 1 albums on the Billboard 200, including Chief in 2011. Both North and South Carolina are a hotbed for traditional country blues, especially the style known as the Piedmont blues. Elizabeth Cotten, from Chapel Hill, was active in the American folk music revival.

Because of their proximity to universities, areas such as Raleigh-Durham-Chapel Hill (collectively known as the Triangle), Asheville, Greensboro, Greenville, Charlotte, and Wilmington have long been a well-known center for indie rock, metal, punk, jazz, country and hip-hop. Bands and groups from this popular music scene include folk rock The Avett Brothers from the Charlotte area (had a No. 3 album on the Billboard 200 in 2016 with True Sadness), Troop 41, Corrosion of Conformity, Superchunk, The Rosebuds, The Love Language, Benji Hughes, Jon Lindsay, Tift Merritt, Ben Folds Five, Squirrel Nut Zippers, Carolina Chocolate Drops, Lords of the Underground, Between the Buried and Me, Mandolin Orange, and He Is Legend. Concord has hosted the annual three-day Carolina Rebellion hard rock music festival each May at Charlotte Motor Speedway since 2011.

Additional notable North Carolina musicians include country singers Andy Griffith from Mt. Airy, Charlie Daniels (d. 2020) (the bluegrass influenced "The Devil Went Down to Georgia" 1979) from Wilmington, Ronnie Milsap ("Smoky Mountain Rain" 1980), Randy Travis from the Charlotte area ("Forever and Ever, Amen" 1987), Kellie Pickler from the Charlotte area, Scotty McCreery from the Raleigh area (Had a No. 1 album on the Billboard 200 with Clear as Day in 2011), Parmalee ("Carolina" 2013), and Luke Combs (had a No. 1 album on Billboard 200 with What You See Is What You Get in 2019) and Chase Rice (had a No. 3 album on Billboard 200 with Ignite the Night in 2014), both from Asheville. Soul singer Ben E. King (d. 2015) ("Stand by Me" 1961). Emmy and Pulitzer prize winner Rhiannon Giddens is from Greensboro, North Carolina. Glam metal band FireHouse ("All She Wrote" 1991) from Charlotte, Pop rock band Athenaeum from Greensboro, Fred Durst from Gastonia-lead singer of Limp Bizkit, and alternative metal band Decyfer Down. Beach music group The Catalinas ("Summertime's Calling Me" 1975) is from Charlotte, and pop singer Clay Aiken (the Billboard Hot 100 No. 1 "This Is the Night" 2003) is from Raleigh.

Notable rappers, producers, and people in hip-hop from North Carolina include: J. Cole, DaBaby (had a Billboard No. 1 Hot 100 hit with "Rockstar" in 2020, Petey Pablo, 9th Wonder, Rapsody, Fred Durst, Mez, Lute, Ski Beatz, Deniro Farrar, and Cordae.

== Early black string band music ==
Slave musicians in North Carolina and throughout the country were often responsible for providing the dance music for both white and African American social gatherings. If a slave was trained as a musician, their value as property went up for their masters. String bands were formed to accompany the social dancing. After slaves were given their freedom, small communities of blacks began to form in the North Carolina Piedmont region. One of these communities outside of Statesville, North Carolina had enough of a fiddler population to support a fiddler's convention. Joe Thompson, an African American fiddler who died in 2012, is from the Cedar Grove community in North Carolina. The banjo was another popular instrument for African Americans to play in a string band. The banjo is an instrument adapted from its African relative the akonting, and younger black musicians often learned to play from older community members. One black musician, Joe Fulp, from the Walnut Cove community used the banjo to help pass the time while waiting for tobacco to cure. String Bands of the North Carolina Piedmont region had their own sound consisting of long bow fiddle playing, flowing banjo lines, and a prominent bass line provided by the guitar, an instrument added to the ensemble in the early 20th century. The style of Piedmont string bands was influenced by the dance tune melodies of Europe and the rhythmic complexity of African banjo playing.

== Gospel music ==
North Carolina is also considered a cradle of gospel music. The Moravians who established the town of Winston-Salem had published Europe's first hymnal in the 15th century, and had brought from the Czech Republic and Saxony instruments including skills to build pipe organs. Music was an integral part of community life. Everyone participated in brass bands and knew the songs which told of births, deaths and other events. The Moravian Music Foundation in Old Salem contains the archive of these materials.

In the days of slavery, spirituals played a huge role in the lives of the slaves of North Carolina elite, and after emancipation, this stayed true. During the 1940s and 50s, North Carolina was a favorite place to visit of gospel singers for multiple reasons, among which was North Carolina's less rigorous Jim Crow laws. North Carolina is also home to a number of gospel singers, the most famous being Shirley Caesar, known as the "First Lady of Gospel". Caesar got her start when the group The Caravans came through Wilson in 1958. North Carolina is also famous for its abundance of family gospel groups which thrive all throughout the state. Award-winning vocal group The Kingsmen originate in Asheville.

== Piedmont blues ==
The Piedmont blues is a type of blues music characterized by a unique finger-picking method on the guitar in which a regular, alternating-thumb bass pattern supports a melody using treble strings. Blind Boy Fuller (1904–1941) was a popular Piedmont blues guitarist, who played for tips outside tobacco warehouses in Durham during the 1930s. Fuller recorded more than 120 sides during the second half of the 1930s. Floyd Council (1911–1976) sometimes busked with Fuller. South Carolina-born Piedmont blues musician Rev. Gary Davis (1896–1972) also played in Durham in the 1930s when the city had a thriving black business community and an emerging black middle class. Singer and guitarist Carolina Slim (1923–1953) also worked as a musician around Durham. Etta Baker (1913–2006) was first recorded in 1956. Singer, guitarist, and songwriter John Dee Holeman (1929–2021) was based in Durham from 1954 to his death.

Cultural organizations in North Carolina have supported the preservation of the Piedmont blues. The Greensboro-based Piedmont Blues Preservation Society has partnered with musicians such as Max Drake (born 1952) and a number of public schools in North Carolina to provide performances, exhibitions, and educational programs.

== Jazz musicians ==
Several notable jazz musicians were originally from North Carolina. In the case of bebop pianist Thelonious Monk, (b. Rocky Mount, NC, October 10, 1917) the North Carolina connection is slight, as Monk's family moved to Manhattan when Monk was four. Saxophonist John Coltrane 1926–1967) spent most of his childhood in High Point, North Carolina, before moving to Philadelphia when he was sixteen. Bebop pioneer Max Roach was born in Newland, but like Monk, moved with his family to New York City when he was four. Other jazz musicians from North Carolina include guitarist Tal Farlow, considered one of the top players during the 1950s. Hard-bop saxophonists Lou Donaldson and Tina Brooks were originally North Carolinians. Hard-bop trumpeter Woody Shaw, pianist Billy Taylor, saxophonist and flautist Harold Vick, pianist and singer dubbed the "High Priestess of Soul" Dr. Nina Simone, alto saxophonist Tab Smith, bassist Percy Heath, and singer June Tyson were born in the state as well. South Carolinian Dizzy Gillespie grew up just over the state line and attended school at the Laurinburg Institute in North Carolina. Jazz composer and arranger Billy Strayhorn spent some of his summers in Hillsborough, NC with his grandparents.

== Rock ==
Rock and roll guitarist, songwriter, and vocalist Link Wray, who first came to popularity in the late 1950s, was born in Dunn. Other musicians of note include guitarist Audley Freed who was born in Burgaw and played with Lynyrd Skynyrd; Jason Roy, who was founder of the Christian Rock group Building 429 from Fayetteville; and vocalist James "Jimi" Bennett, who was from Leland and sang in the Christian rock group King James. The platinum-selling post-grunge band Daughtry is from a suburb of Greensboro. Daughtry has had two No. 1 albums on the Billboard 200, including Daughtry in 2006. Daughtry had four No. 1 songs on the Adult Top 40 chart in the late 2000s. Alternative country singer Ryan Adams from Raleigh had a No. 4 album on the Billboard 200 in 2014.

=== Chapel Hill rock ===
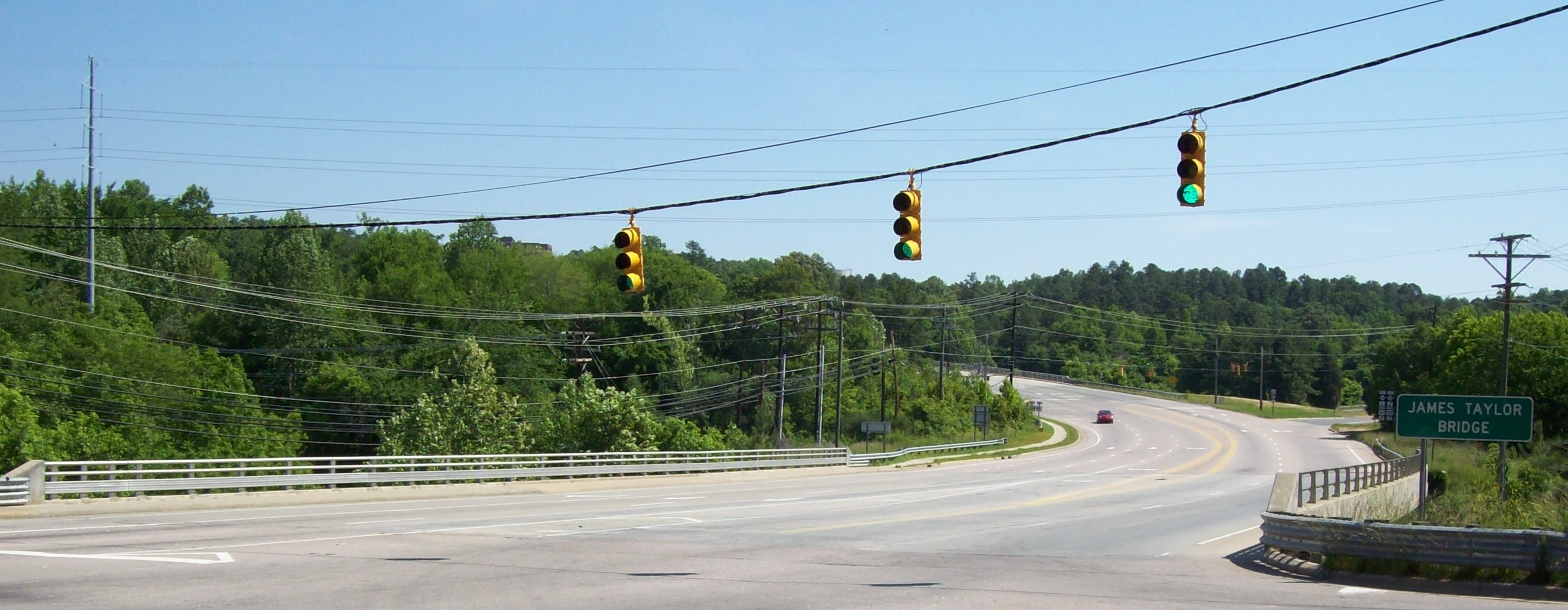
James Taylor Bridge, Chapel Hill

Chapel Hill's music scene dates back to the 1950s, and began to take off in the 1960s, when the Cat's Cradle Coffeehouse nurtured local folk activity. One of the first local legends, The Corsayers (later The Fabulous Corsairs) – featuring Alex Taylor and younger brother James – could be heard around town. Later, Arrogance became a major part of the folk scene. James Taylor would go on to a successful career as a singer-songwriter, and his "Carolina in My Mind" would become an unofficial anthem for the state. His song "You've Got a Friend" was a No. 1 hit on the Billboard Hot 100 in 1971. The Chapel Hill Museum opened a permanent exhibit dedicated to Taylor; at the same occasion the US-15-501 highway bridge over Morgan Creek, near the site of the Taylor family home and mentioned in Taylor's song "Copperline", was dedicated to Taylor.

The Chapel Hill music scene began to pick up steam in the 1980s when bands including The Pressure Boys, The Connells, Flat Duo Jets, Southern Culture on the Skids, A Number of Things, Fetchin Bones, and Snatches of Pink began releasing their own records or signing to independent record labels.

In the late 1980s through the mid-1990s and 2000s, the Chapel Hill scene reached its peak as bands such as Superchunk, Polvo, Archers of Loaf, Alternative States, Small, Zen Frisbee, Dillon Fence, Sex Police, Pipe, The Veldt, Metal Flake Mother were signed to local and national labels.

In the late 1990s, gold record and platinum success came to Chapel Hill bands Squirrel Nut Zippers and the piano pop trio Ben Folds Five (who had a comeback with a No. 10 album on the Billboard 200, The Sound of the Life of the Mind in 2012).

=== Punk rock and metal ===
Raleigh-Durham-Chapel Hill was a regional center for punk rock in the late 1970s, due to its large number of college students. The first wave of bands were more power-pop than punk, and included Peter Holsapple & the H-Bombs, Sneakers, Secret Service, Nevermind, and Chris Stamey and the dBs. The punks arrived shortly after with 'th Cigaretz, The Dads, the Bad Checks, Butchwax, The X-Teens, Human Furniture, and the Junkie Sluts. Later hardcore punk bands included Corrosion of Conformity, No Labels, Colcor, UNICEF, Stillborn Christians, DAMM, Bloodmobile, Subculture, Sacred Cows, Ugly Americans, 30 Foot Beast, Sodium Citrate, Mission DC, the Celibate Commandos, Rights Reserved, DLW, Creeping Flesh, Time Bomb, Stations of the Cross, A Number of Things, and Oral Fixation.

In 2017, the punk band The Muslims was formed in Durham, North Carolina as a reaction to the election of Donald Trump.

Some other notable Heavy Metal acts from North Carolina are Alesana, Weedeater, Divided by Friday, Buzzoven, Daylight Dies, ASG, Between the Buried and Me, Wretched, Space Age Polymers Co (SAPCO), Confessor, and Schuylar Croom from Wilmington, who was a founder of the rock and roll band He is Legend.

At the same time, Charlotte had its own punk rock scene, with bands such as Antiseen, Judas Bullethead, Social Savagery, and Influential Habits.

Christian pop punk band Philmont also originates from Charlotte.

=== Alternative rock ===
Rainbow Kitten Surprise (from Boone), Sylvan Esso, Ben Folds Five, and Charlotte's Paper Tongues ("Ride to California" 2009), Will*Saint Creek are all from North Carolina.

== Soul/R&B ==
Saxophonist Maceo Parker and his brother drummer Melvin Parker, best known for their work with James Brown, were born in Kinston. Funk band L.T.D. formed in Greensboro. Washington Go-Go singer/guitarist Chuck Brown was born in Gaston. Soul singer Ruby Johnson was born in Elizabeth City. Funk rock singer Betty Davis was born in Durham. Funkadelic guitarist Tawl Ross was born in Wagram.

== Hip-hop ==
The Triangle metropolitan area also boasts a long-standing and diverse hip-hop scene. During hip-hop's golden era in the mid-90s, the Lords of the Underground (who met while attending Shaw University), Omniscence, and Yaggfu Front were acclaimed. In 1998, Little Brother, composed of Rapper Big Pooh, Phonte, and 9th Wonder, met while attending North Carolina Central University. The successful alternative hip-hop group also co-founded the Justus League collective, which features other important North Carolina emcees, including L.E.G.A.C.Y., The Away Team, Darien Brockington, Edgar Allen Floe, Chaundon, and Cesar Comanche.

Other major-label rappers and producers from North Carolina include King Mez, from Raleigh. King Mez was featured on Dr. Dre's Compton album. J. Cole, from Fayetteville has had six consecutive No. 1 albums on the Billboard 200 including his debut Cole World: The Sideline Story.; The Apple Juice Kid, Kaze, Ski, Travis Cherry, Wan Gray, from Raleigh; and Petey Pablo ("Raise Up"), from Greenville. Rapsody, and Well-known underground act Troop 41. Driicky Graham is from Oxford.

Charlotte also has some notable rappers, including DaBaby (had two No. 1 albums on the Billboard 200, such as Kirk in 2019), WELL$, Deniro Farrar, Lute, Bettie Grind, Mr. 704, Quaz, and Ruga. Charlotte's R&B group Jodeci had a No. 2 album on the Billboard 200 in 1995 with The Show, the After Party, the Hotel. Charlotte's K-Ci & JoJo (of Jodeci) had two No. 1 hits on the Billboard Hot 100, including the R&B song "All My Life" in 1998. Also from Charlotte is R&B singer Anthony Hamilton.

American Idol winner Fantasia, from High Point, had a No. 1 Billboard Hot 100 hit with the soul song "I Believe" in 2004.

== Classical music ==
North Carolina is home to several state and regional orchestras including the North Carolina Symphony based in Raleigh, the Asheville Symphony Orchestra, and the Charlotte Symphony Orchestra. In Hickory, there is also the Western Piedmont Symphony and its accompanying youth orchestra, the Western Piedmont Youth Symphony.

Several professional wind ensembles also exist, including the Piedmont Wind Symphony of Winston-Salem and the Wilmington Symphonic Winds.

American microtonal composer Ben Johnston (composer) spent the latter part of his life in North Carolina. His compositions incorporate references to Appalachian and Southern American folk music, as demonstrated in his String Quartet no. 4 "Amazing Grace".

== Folk music ==
Folk music is a unique genre of music that represents familial connections and emotional relationships between artists and the subjects about which they are singing. Specifically in Western North Carolina, this genre represents much of the culture and experiences of these people. While there are a number of different variations of folk music, all of them seek to build communities in an attempt to enhance cultural conversations and gatherings. The Appalachian area is famous for its ability to bring people together through the transmission of folk classics and authentic voices. These connections also form to share more about a particular region through song that depicts different cultural elements and interests of the people and time.

Folk music is extremely important to the history and culture of Western North Carolina. Most notably, the Appalachian Mountains contain a record of folk music being recited and passed down from generation to generation. Much of this information relating to the vibrant folk music culture in this area of North Carolina comes from The Frank Clyde Brown Collection located at Duke University in Durham. This archive gives historians insight into the various artists and songs that were commonly being performed during this time. For example, Frank Proffitt and others constantly performed the infamous song "Tom Dooley" as a way to show their regional pride. These performances show the popularity that folk music held throughout Western North Carolina, especially during its revitalization in the 1950s. A unique aspect of folk music is its dependence on being orally transmitted. This occurred for a number of different reasons, many of which deal with the lack of accessibility in Western North Carolina to other places. There was little communication between these tiny towns and other North Carolina areas, especially when discussing the lack of railroads connecting urban areas to these rural towns; because of that, other expression styles could not be transferred easily. Therefore, it relied solely on the artists to ensure that their favorite renditions of particular folk songs were passed on from one generation to the next. With this ability placed on the artists, there is definitely an impact on the accuracy of the words when transmitting these lyrics over and over again. However, this has often been seen as the beauty and pride of various folk music artists in North Carolina.

For example, tiny western mountainous areas such as Elk Park host a plethora of folk music artists whose memory still lives on in the Frank Clyde Brown Collection. The Church family, headed by Erleen and her husband Truman, epitomize the intentionality of folk singers through their authentic renditions of songs and commitment to bringing communities together in song. Music recorded such as "Black Jack Davy" and "The Titanic" show the importance of continuing the tradition of old time folk songs to be orally transmitted into future generations. This idea of a family unit performing folk music together further supports the mission of this genre to connect communities through a shared culture.

A common practice in folk music is to bring an artist's personal dialect into the respective song or ballad. Plenty of times, specific words and phrases will be altered depending on from which region the Appalachian folk music singer performed. To focus on a specific song to give a more clear example, the folk ballad Black Jack Davy has a number of different variations, solely based on how the song was transmitted from one region of North Carolina to the next. As many different variations of this ballad have been sung, some of them classify as different names. Within the Ozark Folksong Collection, Black Jack Davy has titles ranging from "Gypsy Davy" and "Black Jack Daisy." This shows the power of the artist in transmitting the words and themes from one artist to the next.

The Frank Clyde Brown Collection is arguably the largest compilation of North Carolina folk music in the nation. This collection includes various versions of songs, artists, and styles of reciting this cultural element. Charles Bond, a former Duke University undergraduate student, accidentally fell upon this collection of archives. Ever since, he has been delving into them to learn about the history of Appalachia folk music and the impact it had on families all around this area. With the discovery of this archive, families along Western North Carolina have recently been able to obtain copies of their beloved family members singing local music.

The study of folk music allows people to learn about the cultural history of North Carolina. The projects of the Frank Clyde Brown Collection and other folk music initiatives introduce people to a popular form of expression from the past. Duke University students are exploring these archives to learn more about the history of folk music in North Carolina. Through an Archives Alive course taught by Professor Trudi Abel, seven students have engaged in a Bass Connections project to uncover more information about this folk music. These projects have culminated in online, digitized sources of information about various folk artists, their hometowns, and the songs they have performed.

North Carolina is home to a number of groups from the Indie Folk and Progressive Bluegrass scenes, including Mandolin Orange and Mipso from Chapel Hill, Beta Radio from Wilmington, Steep Canyon Rangers from Brevard, Avett Brothers from Concord, River Whyless from Asheville, Old Crow Medicine Show from Boone, The Collection from Greensboro, and Bombadil and Carolina Chocolate Drops from Durham.

== See also ==
- North Carolina Music Hall of Fame in Kannapolis
- Appalachian music
- Black Mountain College
- List of musicians from North Carolina
