= Skrizzy =

American rapper & songwriter (born 1994)

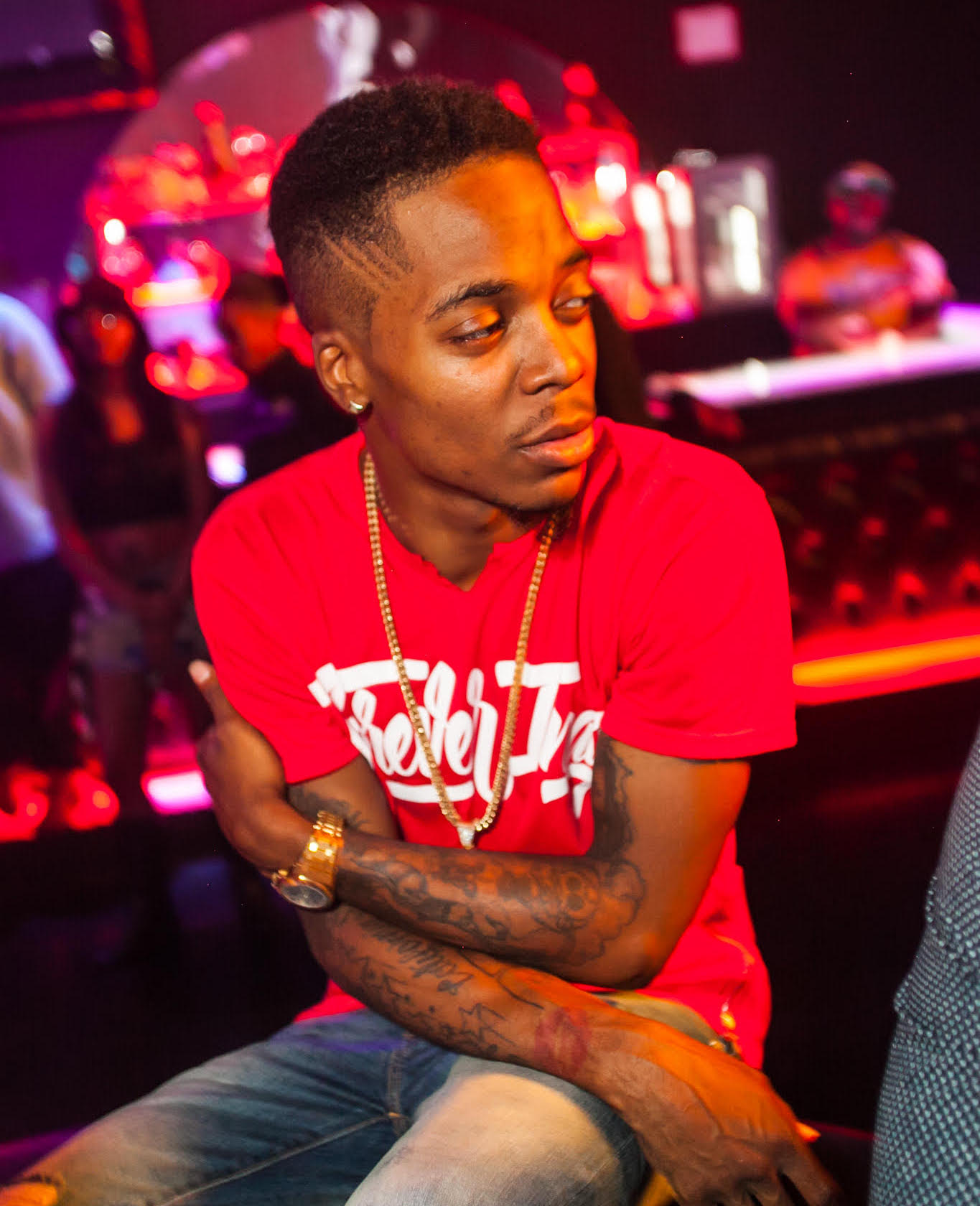

Background information
- Born: Mark-Anthony Greene; September 8, 1994 (age 31)
- Genres: Hip hop; R&B
- Occupations: Rapper; singer; songwriter
- Instrument: Vocals
- Years active: 2007–present
- Label: 4ever Trill

Mark-Anthony Greene, better known by his stage name Skrizzy and formerly known as Young Scrap, is an American rapper, singer and songwriter. His single titled "Love L.A" from his Faded Ambition album charted at No. 18 on the Billboard Twitter Top Tracks during the week of July 12, 2016. He is also credited as writing V.I.C.'s song titled "Twerk It" & “Wobble” which charted at No. 69 on the Billboard Hot R&B/Hip-Hop Songs.

== Early life and career ==
Skrizzy performed with Debbie Allen and Savion Glover until he moved to Maryland. While in his second year in high school, he released his first album titled Puppy Power under his uncle's record label and in 2008 he signed a recording contract with Universal Music Group under which he released the single "The Melody" which was positively received among music fans.

On September 12, 2016, Skrizzy released the first of his "Music We Can Fuck To" series titled Music We Can Fuck Too which featured guest appearances from notable rappers like Yo Gotti and V.I.C. His Jahlil Beats-produced single titled "Love L.A" charted at No. 18 during the week of July 12, 2016, on the Billboard Twitter Top Tracks. On August 4, 2016, he released a mixtape titled Faded Ambition with a guest appearance from Lil Wayne and music production from producers DJ Mustard and Jahlil Beats. On June 20, 2016, Skrizzy released Trill and B, a project he started recording in 2014.

In 2016 Skrizzy's career path was put on hold due to thyroid cancer while also dealing with the loss of his voice, putting a pause on any new music releases for 2 years. On June 21, 2020, Skrizzy released a slew of new music including "Undercover hoe" which featured 24hrs. Covering the track, HotNewHipHop said "both artists can be heard lamenting about their issues with women and how some just want to play games, while hiding their true intentions".

Taking a hiatus until July 11, 2021, Skrizzy released "Troublesome" featuring South Carolina rapper Renni Rucci which also premiered with HotNewHiphop who said Skrizzy and Renni Rucci are the perfect duo. Skrizzy announced an R&B album, titled I'm Not Toxic, You Are, to be released July 26, 2024, along with a rap album tentatively titled I'm Not A Rapper 2 which is slated for release October 25, 2024.

== Discography ==
Album

Year	Album Title	Album Details
2016	Trill & B	Released: June 20, 2016; Label: 4Ever Trill; Formats: Digital download
2020	Music We Can Fuck To 6: A Side Niggas Fantasy	Released: February 14, 2020; Label: 4Ever Trill; Formats: Digital download
2024	I'm Not Toxic, You Are	Released: July 26, 2024; Label: 4Ever Trill; Formats: Digital download

=== Mixtapes ===
Year	Mixtape Title	Mixtape Details
2013	Music We Can Fuck Too	Released: September 8, 2013; Label: Independent; Formats: Digital download
2013	Music We Can Fuck To 2	Released: December 5, 2013; Label: Independent; Formats: Digital download
2014	Music We Can Fuck To 3	Released: August 6, 2014; Label: Independent; Formats: Digital download
2015	Music We Can Fuck To 4	Released: April 8, 2015; Label: Independent; Formats: Digital download
2015	Music We Can Fuck To 5	Released: October 14, 2015; Label: Independent; Formats: Digital download
2016	Faded Ambition	Released: August 14, 2016; Label: G-Hop Music; Formats: Digital download
2024	Im Not A Rapper	Released: January 19, 2024; Label: 4ever Trill; Formats: Digital download

=== EPs ===
Year	Album title	Album details
2015	It Wasn't Trill Enough	Released: December 8, 2015; Label: G-Hop Music; Formats: Digital download
2019	Free Kevo	Released: September 20, 2019; Label: 4Ever Trill; Formats: Digital download

=== Selected singles ===
List of singles, with selected chart positions, showing year released and album name
Title	Year	Peak chart positions	Album
Title	Year	US Twitter Top Tracks	Album
"The Melody"	2009	—	Non-album singles
"Like Yeah"	2009	—	Non-album singles
"Lights On"	2010	—	Non-album singles
"Get Funky"	2010	—	Non-album singles
"Text Me" (featuring V.I.C., Troop 41 & Jru Gunz)	2010	—	Non-album singles
"Text Me" (featuring Lil Chuckee)	2013	—	Music We Can Fuck Too
"No Love"	2015	—	Faded Ambition
"Throwin Dolla's"	2016	—	Faded Ambition
"Love L.A" (Featuring Mustard)	2016	18	Faded Ambition
"Main Ting" (featuring OFB Yung)	2016	—	Trill and B
"Bust It Open" Featuring Mustard)	2016	—	Trill and B
"Better Work for It"	2016	—	Trill and B
"Undercover Hoe" (featuring 24hrs)	2020	__	I'm Not Toxic, You Are
"Ye Taught Me"	2021	__	Non-album singles
"Sick And Tired"	2021	__	Non-album singles
"Troublesome" (Featuring Renni Rucci)	2021	__	I'm Not A Rapper 2
"P.T.P" (Featuring Squalla, Kiara & Reign)	2022	__	I'm Not A Rapper 2
"Safe Space"	2023	__	I'm Not Toxic, You Are
"Round n Round"	2023	__	I'm Not Toxic, You Are
"BTW" (Featuring Sophia Diana)	2024	__	I'm Not Toxic, You Are
"To Each Their Own"	2024	__	I'm Not Toxic, You Are
"All 4"	2024	__	I'm Not Toxic, You Are
"Splash"	2024	__	I'm Not Toxic, You Are
"I Like it" (I Love It) (Featuring Brandy Haze)	2024	__	I'm Not Toxic, You Are
