= Troop 41 =

American hip hop group

- Origin: Raleigh, North Carolina, U.S.
- Genres: Hip hop
- Years active: 2005–present
- Labels: Universal Republic
- Members: Lil Lee; T-Breezy; Lil Inferno

Troop 41 is an American hip hop ensemble from Raleigh, North Carolina formed in 2005. The group consists of three members: T-Breezy, Lil Lee and Lil Inferno.

== Career ==
Their 2010 single "Do the John Wall" was originally released by KAIRIZMIC Music, whose artist management and marketing pushed the song to chart as a top 100 digital single on iTunes and in Billboard magazine, eventually peaking at number 76 on the Billboard Hot 100. "Do the John Wall" was later re-released on Universal Republic after successfully garnering the group a major recording contract due to charting on iTunes and Billboard magazine, and receiving over ten million views on YouTube. The song was produced by Darius "DeeMoney Beatz" Lassiter, with Sigh Griffin as executive producer. The song is based on a Kentucky-based dance, and inspired by seeing NBA basketball player John Wall performing the dance.

The group were described by SPIN as "a would-be Southern Pharcyde."

The name Troop 41 was derived from their ages at the time; by adding together their respective ages, they got the number 41.

Troop 41 was featured on rapper Young Scrap's song "Text Me" in 2010.

== Members ==
- Tristian Brown (T-Breezy), who graduated from Southeast Raleigh Magnet High School
- Lelynd Darkes (Lil Lee), who graduated from Needham B. Broughton High School
- Dakare Wilder (Lil Inferno), who graduated from William G. Enloe High School

All three members graduated from John W. Ligon Middle School in Raleigh, North Carolina. There, they took a freestyle poetry class taught by Lester Francis. In the class, there were often arguments about whether or not rap was considered poetry. Francis believed that it was and allowed them to write rap in his class. There, they got the inspiration to become professional rappers. In 2011, after their single "Do the John Wall" was released, they went back to Ligon to give a private performance for the student body.

== Discography ==
=== "Do the John Wall" ===
"Do the John Wall" is a hip-hop dance song by Troop 41. This song is based on the John Wall Dance, which came from Kentucky Wildcats/Washington Wizards player John Wall. It was released onto iTunes according to reports on May 26, 2010.

The remix of this song features Young Money rapper Lil Chuckee. It reached No. 76 on the Billboard Hot 100 during the week of January 11, 2011.
