= Trill and B =

Studio album by Skrizzy
- Released: June 20, 2016
- Recorded: 2014–2016
- Genre: Hip hop
- Length: 68:09
- Producer: Various: Fred Nice; Zaire; Lokey; Flash Beats; Scott Supreme; Paul Cabbin; Jacob Lethal; Mindsweeper; ItsDG; Chapo; Dope Boi Beatz; Dee Money; Kydd Strumentals

Skrizzy chronology
| It Wasn't Trill Enough (2015) | Trill and B (2016) |

Singles from Trill and B
- 1. "Better Work for It" Released: June 29, 2015; 2. "Main Ting" Released: October 22, 2015

Trill and B is a studio album by American rapper Skrizzy which was released on 20 June 2016 via iTunes.

== Background ==
On 28 December 2015, Skrizzy organized a listening party of the album at DJ Carisma's studio where he performed few songs. He revealed to have trimmed 300 recorded songs to release the 18-track album. Preceding the album's release were two lead singles "Main Ting" and "Better Work for It" which garnered over 5 million streams on Spotify upon its release.

== Critical reception ==
Jake Mayo of RESPECT. was impressed with the over-all musical composition and further went on to state that, "Regardless whether Skrizzy’s is spitting bars of hitting falsettos, the album impresses across the board, positioning him as one of the new wave's most formidable shapers."

== Track listing ==
| No. | Title | Length |
|---|---|---|
| 1. | "Sounds" | 4:29 |
| 2. | "Trill Vibes" (featuring Carlon) | 3:33 |
| 3. | "Main Ting" (featuring Yung) | 5:09 |
| 4. | "Better Work for It" | 3:30 |
| 5. | "Pyrex" | 3:13 |
| 6. | "Soo...Real" | 4:19 |
| 7. | "Dedication & Consistancy" (featuring Morning Afta) | 3:05 |
| 8. | "Curious?" | 4:07 |
| 9. | "Gon Head" | 2:54 |
| 10. | "She Bad" (featuring Rico) | 4:17 |
| 11. | "IDGAF" (featuring Jaida) | 3:42 |
| 12. | "Party Girls" (featuring Carlos) | 3:40 |
| 13. | "Balance" | 3:44 |
| 14. | "The Trillest (Stephanie's Interlude)" | 4:37 |
| 15. | "Options" (featuring Sean Bradbury) | 3:51 |
| 16. | "Drugs" | 3:46 |

Bonus track
| No. | Title | Length |
|---|---|---|
| 17. | "Me and My Bitch" | 2:17 |
| 18. | "No Regular" (featuring La Envy) | 3:51 |
| Total length: | | 68:09 |

== Personnel ==
Musicians

- Carlon – featured artist
- Yung – featured artist
- Morning Afta – featured artist
- Ricoche – featured artist
- Jaida – featured artist
- Carlos – featured artist
- Sean Bradbury – featured artist

Production

- Joey Magic – recording and mixing engineer
- Fred Nice – production (track 1)
- Kydd Strumentals – production (track 2, 5)
- Lokey – production (track 3)
- Zaire – production (track 4, 11, 17)
- Dope Boi Beatz - production (track 6)
- Pdub the Producer – production (track 7)
- Flash Beats – production (track 8)
- Mindsweeper – production (track 10)
- Scott Supreme – production (track 12)
- Paul Cabbin – production (track 13)
- Dee Money – production (track 14)
- Chapo – production (track 14)
- Scott Supreme – production (track 15)
- ItsDG – production (track 16)
- Jacob Lethal – production (track 18)

== Release history ==
List of release dates, showing region, formats, label, editions and reference
| Region | Date | Format(s) | Label | Edition(s) | Ref. |
|---|---|---|---|---|---|
| Worldwide | 20 June 2016 | digital download | Independent | Standard | |
