= John Wall Dance =

Type of dance

John Wall Dance arm motion

The John Wall Dance is a dance performed by flexing the arms and twisting the wrist. American basketball player John Wall first performed the eponymous dance during his introduction at Big Blue Madness at the University of Kentucky in October 2009. Wall says that his idea for the dance came from the music video of the song "Do the Shizz" made by the Louisville rapper Kenzo. LaShawn "Sugar Shizz" Talbert, who inspired the dance, performed "The Shizz" in the music video. The John Wall Dance has subsequently integrated itself into popular culture.

On August 21, 2010, LaShawn "Sugar Shizz" Talbert, the inspiration behind the John Wall Dance, died after being shot in the head in Louisville. Talbert created the dance "The Shizz" which was shown in a music video by Kenzo who further popularized his dance move.

On March 11, 2011, Kensey "Kenzo" Rankin, the hip hop artist from Kentucky who wrote the song "Do the Shizz", filed a lawsuit against CBS Broadcasting for airing segments regarding Wall and the dance. Kenzo owned the copyright to the song with Gracie Productions LLC and Marcus Clark and alleged that CBS exploited the song without permission, though he did not claim copyright of the dance.

== In popular culture ==
- Hip hop group Troop 41 released the single "Do the John Wall".
- A scene in the TV show Cougar Town references the dance.
- Former Washington Redskins kick returner Brandon Banks, now with the Toronto Argonauts of the CFL, performed the dance as his touchdown celebration. Banks is from Raleigh, North Carolina, the same hometown as Wall, and has been longtime friends with Wall.
- When John Wall was drafted to the Washington Wizards, Washington Nationals pitcher Stephen Strasburg and Washington Capitals left winger Alex Ovechkin did the dance in a video, with Wizards owner Ted Leonsis also attempting the dance.
- On The Daily Show with Jon Stewart on October 28, 2010, Wyatt Cenac performed the John Wall Dance.
- Magic Johnson performed the John Wall Dance at Rupp Arena on February 25, 2010.
