= John Wall =

American basketball player (born 1990)

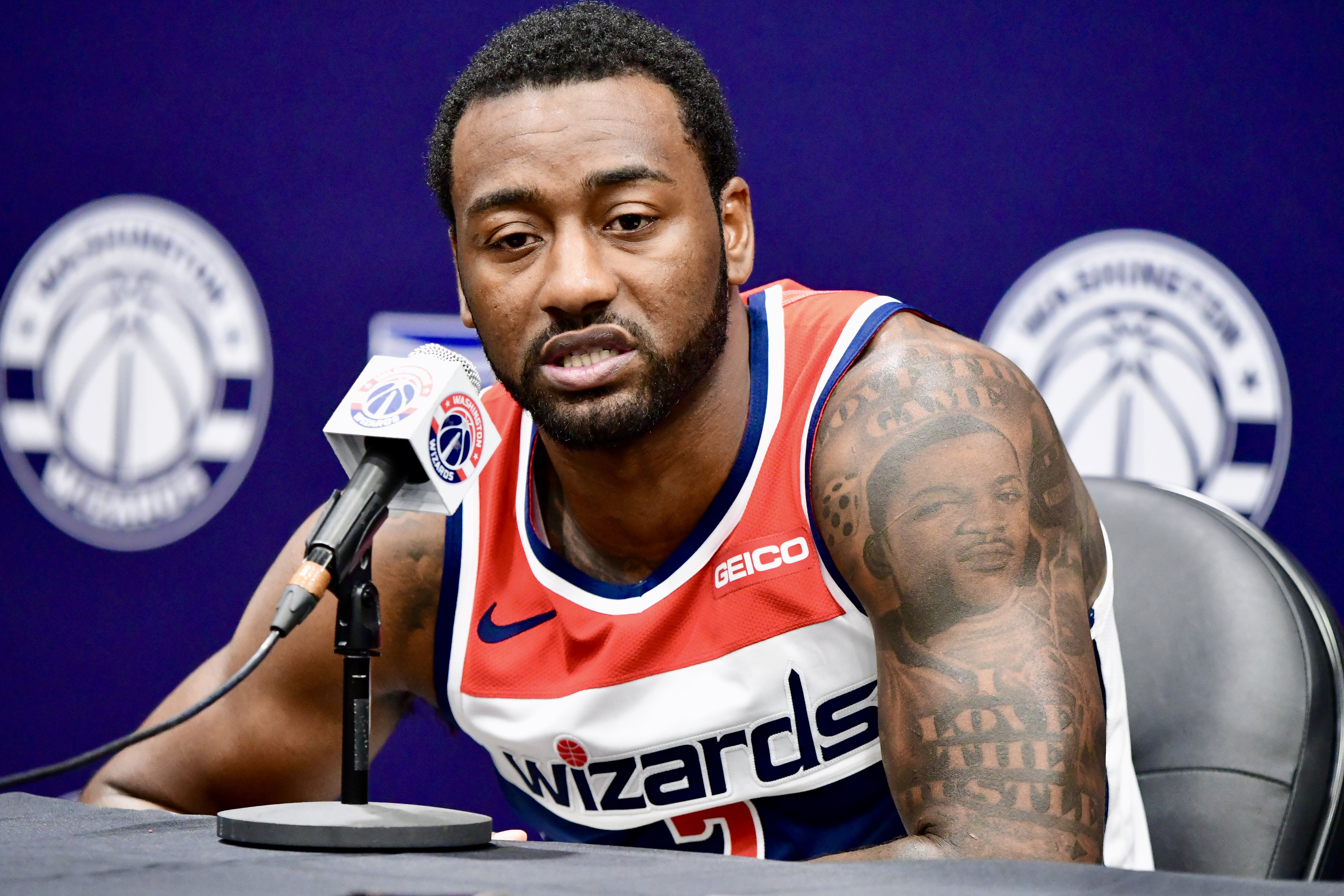
- Wall with the Washington Wizards in 2019

Personal information
- Born: September 6, 1990 (age 36) Raleigh, North Carolina, U.S.
- Listed height: 6 ft 3 in (1.91 m)
- Listed weight: 210 lb (95 kg)

Career information
- High school: Garner (Garner, North Carolina); Broughton (Raleigh, North Carolina); Word of God (Raleigh, North Carolina)
- College: Kentucky (2009–2010)
- NBA draft: 2010: 1st round, 1st overall pick
- Drafted by: Washington Wizards
- Playing career: 2010–2023
- Position: Point guard
- Number: 2, 1, 11

Career history
- 2010–2020: Washington Wizards
- 2020–2022: Houston Rockets
- 2022–2023: Los Angeles Clippers

Career highlights
- 5× NBA All-Star (2014–2018); All-NBA Third Team (2017); NBA All-Defensive Second Team (2015); NBA All-Rookie First Team (2011); NBA Slam Dunk Contest champion (2014); Adolph Rupp Trophy (2010); Consensus first-team All-American (2010); USBWA National Freshman of the Year (2010); SEC Player of the Year (2010)

Career NBA statistics
- Points: 12,088 (18.7 ppg)
- Rebounds: 2,704 (4.2 rpg)
- Assists: 5,735 (8.9 apg)
- Stats at NBA.com
- Stats at Basketball Reference

Johnathan Hildred Wall Jr. (born September 6, 1990) is an American former professional basketball player who played 11 seasons in the National Basketball Association (NBA), most notably with the Washington Wizards.

A Raleigh, North Carolina, native, Wall was chosen with the first overall pick of the 2010 NBA draft by the Wizards after playing one year of college basketball for the Kentucky Wildcats. Wall, who played the point guard position, was a five-time NBA All-Star from 2014 to 2018 and was named to the All-NBA Team in 2017. However, he experienced multiple injuries in 2019 and missed more than two years of basketball before being traded to the Houston Rockets in December 2020. After two seasons with the Rockets, he joined the Clippers via free agency before being dealt back to the Rockets, with which he reached a buyout in February 2023.

== Early life ==
Wall was born on September 6, 1990, to Frances Pulley and John Carroll Wall Sr. When he was a year old, his father, who had previously served time in prison for second-degree murder, was convicted of armed robbery. Wall Sr. was released from prison on August 24, 1999, but died of liver cancer a month later at age 52. Wall's older half-brother, John Carroll Wall Jr., promised at their father's funeral to take care of the family, but was incarcerated the next year and released in 2018.

Throughout Wall's childhood, his mother worked multiple jobs to support him, his sister, Cierra, and his half-sister, Tonya.

The death of his father caused Wall to frequently reject the authority of adults and act up, occasionally fighting, mostly in middle school. He was cited for breaking and entering as a teenager.

Wall played for two AAU basketball teams, first Garner Road and then D-One Sports.

== High school career ==
Wall played his first two years of high school basketball at Garner Magnet High School in Garner, North Carolina. After his second season, his family moved to Raleigh. He attended Broughton High School, where he repeated his sophomore year. Despite having a very impressive tryout, Wall was cut from the school's varsity team for attitude-related issues. For this reason, he transferred to Word of God Christian Academy, also in Raleigh. It was there that Wall set about the reform of his attitude and related issues. Coach Levi Beckwith worked with Wall, first to stop demeaning his teammates for missed layups, and later to improve his facial expressions and general demeanor.

On the heels of his second sophomore year of high school, in the summer of 2007, Wall was invited to the prestigious Reebok All-American Camp in Philadelphia; there, he distinguished himself by scoring 28 points against a team that featured future lottery pick Brandon Jennings.

In 2008, Wall played in the Elite 24 Hoops Classic, at which he scored 10 points and won co-MVP honors alongside Dominic Cheek, Maalik Wayns, and Lance Stephenson.

As a fifth-year senior in 2009, Wall averaged 19.7 points, nine assists, and over eight rebounds for Word of God Christian Academy and was ranked one of the best high school basketball players in the class of that year. He led the Holy Rams basketball team all the way to the North Carolina Independent Schools Athletic Association (NCISAA) 1A state championship; they were ultimately defeated by United Faith Christian Academy 56–53. Wall scored 11 points in the contest. He was selected to participate in the 2009 Nike Hoop Summit in Portland, Oregon; he scored 13 points to go along with 11 assists and five steals at the high-profile event. He was also selected to play in the Jordan Brand Classic that year at Madison Square Garden, where he notched six assists.

College recruiting
Name	Hometown	School	Height	Weight	Commit date
John Wall; PG	Raleigh, North Carolina	Garner Magnet / Word of God	6 ft 4 in (1.93 m)	184 lb (83 kg)	May 19, 2009
John Wall; PG	Recruit ratings: Scout: Rivals: 247Sports: (98)				
Overall recruit ranking: Scout: 1 (PG); 2 (national); 1 (school) Rivals: 1 (PG); 1 (national)
Note: In many cases, Scout, Rivals, 247Sports, On3, and ESPN may conflict in their listings of height and weight.; In these cases, the average was taken. ESPN grades are on a 100-point scale.; Sources: "2009 Kentucky Basketball Commitment List". Rivals.; "2009 Kentucky College Basketball Team Recruiting Prospects". Scout.; "Kentucky Wildcats 2009 Player Commits". ESPN.; "Scout.com Team Recruiting Rankings". Scout.; "2009 Team Ranking". Rivals.

== College career ==
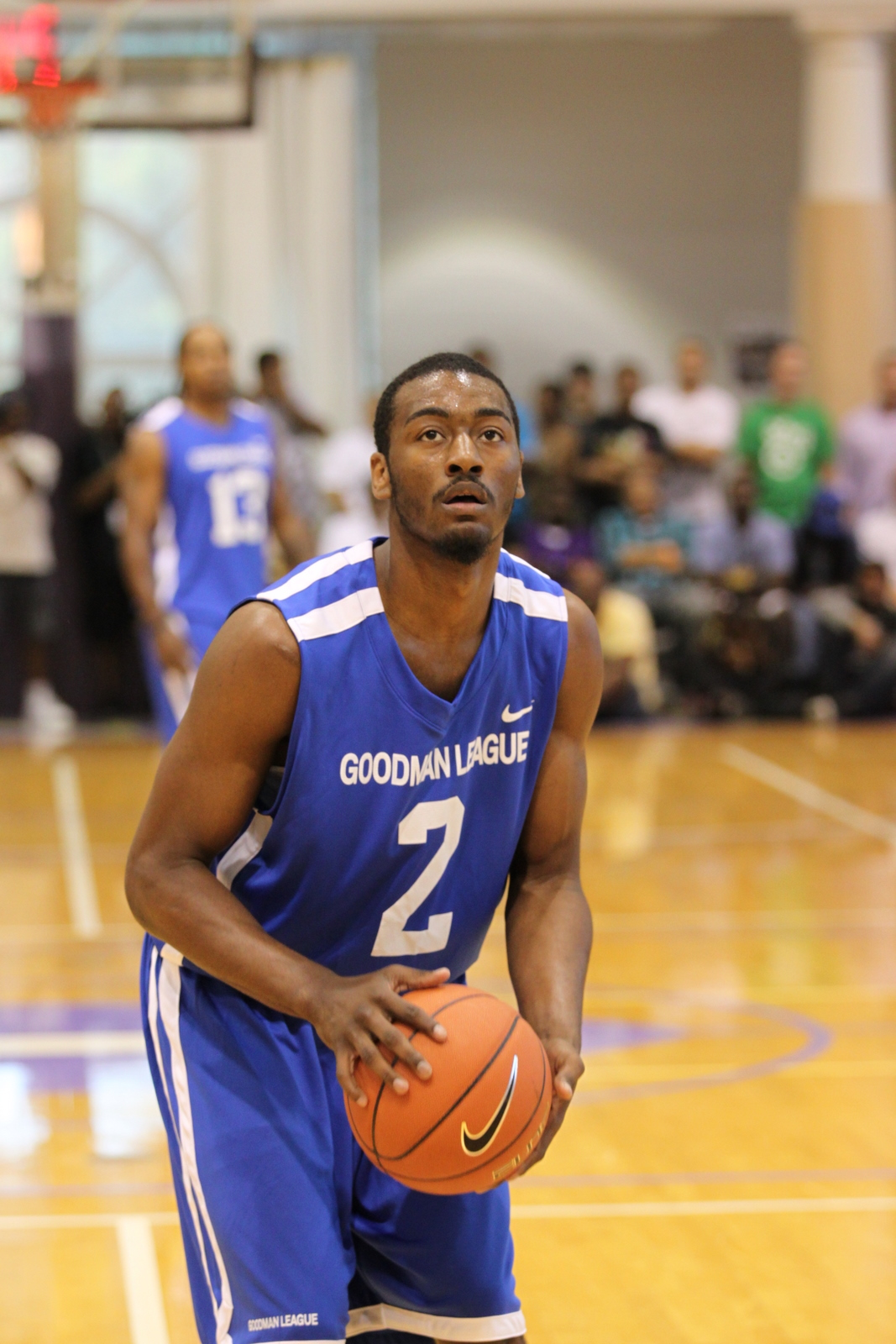
John Wall shooting a free throw at Drew-Goodman League

Originally recruited by the University of Kentucky, Duke University, Georgia Tech, and University of Kansas, Wall announced his commitment to attend the University of Kentucky on May 19, 2009. He was suspended by the NCAA from Kentucky's first exhibition game and first regular season game for travel benefits he received from his AAU coach Brian Clifton, a certified agent at the time. In his first action as a Wildcat, in an exhibition game against Clarion University of Pennsylvania, the freshman point guard led his team to victory with 27 points and nine assists in 28 minutes of playing time. In his collegiate debut at Kentucky versus Miami University, Wall made the game-winning shot with .5 seconds left on the clock to help then #5 ranked Kentucky win. He finished with 19 points, two rebounds, five assists, and three steals.

On December 29, 2009, against Hartford, Wall set the Kentucky single-game assist record with 16, 11 in the first half, with only one turnover. The mark was previously held by Travis Ford, at 15, and was broken on Ford's 40th birthday. Wall scored nine points, failing to break double digits for the first time in his college career.

Over the course of the 2009-2010 season, Wall led the Wildcats in scoring, assists, and steals en route to a SEC regular season and SEC tournament championship, a 29-2 regular season record, and an Elite Eight tournament appearance.

On September 22, 2017, Wall was inducted into the University of Kentucky Athletics Hall of Fame.

== Professional career ==
Because Wall was a fifth-year high school senior in 2009 and would turn 19 by the end of the year, some sources argued that he would be eligible for the 2009 NBA draft. League rules stated that American players must turn 19 during the year of the draft and be a year removed from their regular high school class. NBA spokesman Tim Frank told sportswriter Chad Ford that the league was not sure whether Wall met the second criterion, and that league officials would need to "do [their] due diligence to determine his eligibility". Wall announced in April 2009 that he was not entering the 2009 NBA draft, where he was expected to be the first player taken, and would attend Kentucky instead.

=== Washington Wizards (2010–2020) ===
==== All-Rookie honors (2010–11) ====
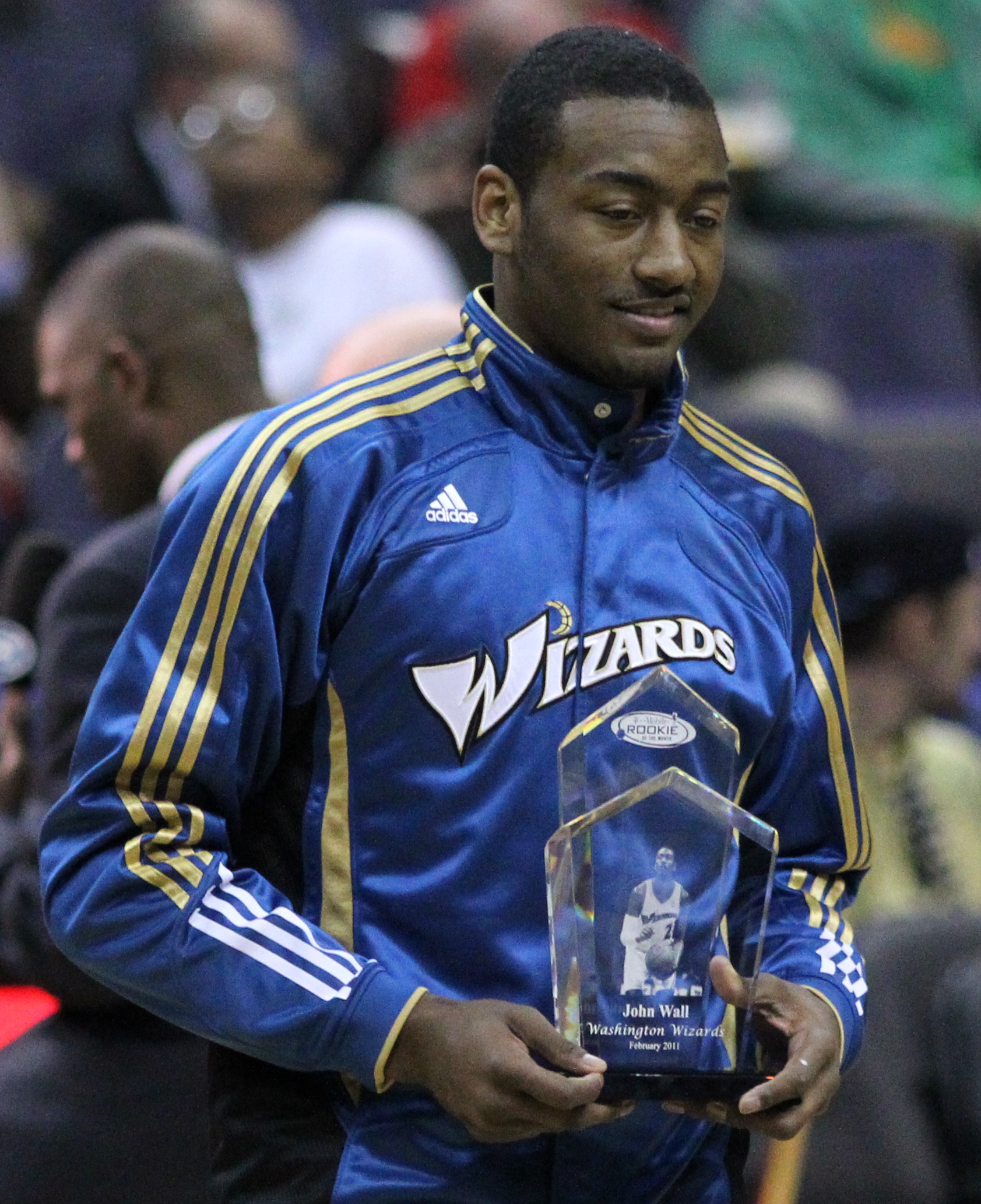
Wall with the February 2011 Rookie of the Month award

On April 7, 2010, Wall announced that he would forgo his final three seasons of collegiate eligibility and enter the 2010 NBA draft, where he was expected to be the first overall selection for the Washington Wizards. On May 3, Wall signed with agent Dan Fegan.

On June 23, 2010, Reebok revealed Wall as its latest signing, casting him as the face of its latest basketball shoe, the ZigTech Slash. On June 24, 2010, Wall was drafted as the first overall pick by the Wizards. On June 25, 2010, Mayor Adrian Fenty of Washington, D.C., declared June 25 John Wall Day on a plaque handed to Wall during his Wizards presser.

Wall was named the Most Valuable Player of the 2010 Las Vegas Summer League, averaging 23.5 points, 7.8 assists, 4.0 rebounds and 2.5 steals in 32.3 minutes per game. Wall made his NBA debut in a 112–83 loss to the Orlando Magic. He had 14 points, nine assists, and three steals. In his third game, his first home game, he tied a franchise record with nine steals, and became only the second player in NBA history to get nine assists or more in each of his first three games. On November 10, Wall recorded his first career triple-double with 19 points, 10 rebounds, and 13 assists to go along with six steals and only one turnover. Wall was the third youngest player to record a triple-double in NBA history. John Wall was named 2011 Rookie Game MVP during the 2011 All-Star Weekend. Wall was also named Eastern Conference Rookie of the Month from January–April and finished second in Rookie of the Year voting behind unanimous selection Blake Griffin and was named to the NBA All-Rookie First Team.

==== Sophomore season (2011–12) ====
Wall would play in and start all of the Wizards' 66 games during the 2011–12 lockout shortened season. He was selected to play in the NBA All-Star Weekend Rising Stars Challenge. He was drafted to play for Team Chuck, a mix of rookies and sophomores. Wall finished the season averaging 16.3 points, 8.0 assists, and 4.5 rebounds per game.

==== Knee injury (2012–13) ====
Wall missed the beginning of the 2012–13 because of a knee injury. On January 12, he returned against the Atlanta Hawks, scoring 14 points in a Wizards win. On March 18, Wall was named the Eastern Conference Player of the Week for games played between March 11 and March 17. In a road game against the Los Angeles Lakers on March 22, Wall recorded 24 points and a career-high 16 assists in a win. On March 25, in a win over the Memphis Grizzlies, Wall scored a career-high 47 points to go along with 7 rebounds and 8 assists. Wall ended the season with averages of 18.5 points, 7.6 assists, and 4.0 rebounds a game.

==== First All-Star and playoff appearance (2013–14) ====
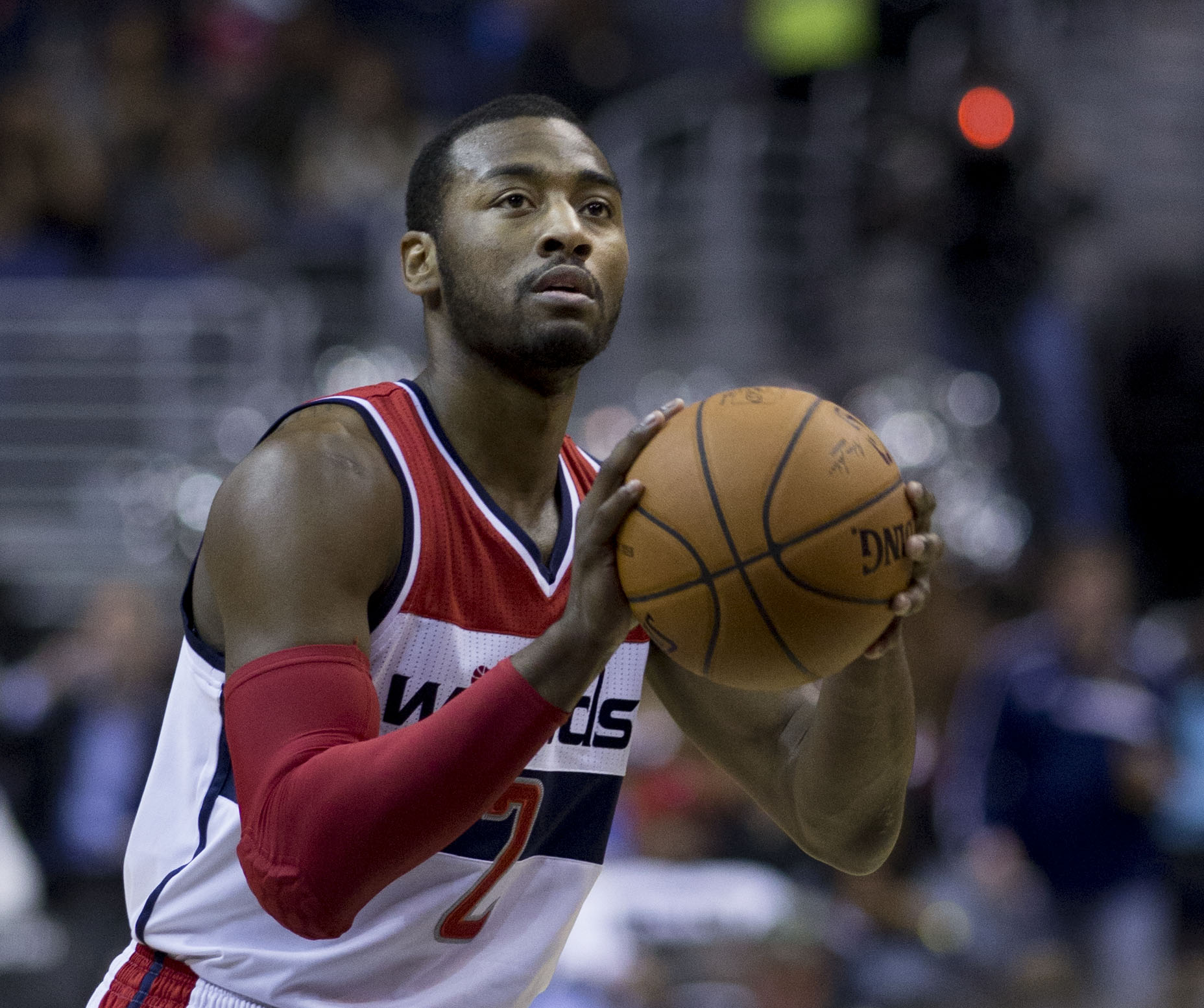
Wall attempting a free throw

On July 31, 2013, Wall, labeled by the Wizards as a designated player, signed a five-year contract extension worth approximately $80 million.

On January 22, 2014, Wall recorded his second career triple-double with 28 points, 11 rebounds and 10 assists in a 113–111 overtime loss to the Boston Celtics. On January 30, 2014, Wall was selected as an East reserve for the 2014 NBA All-Star Game, making this his first All-Star team. During All-Star weekend, he became the first in Washington franchise history to win the Slam Dunk Contest after fans voted him the Dunker of the Night. His final dunk was a reverse slam assisted by the Wizards' mascot. On February 27, 2014, Wall had 31 points and nine assists as the Wizards won a triple overtime game against the Raptors 134–129. It was the franchise's first triple-overtime game since 1975. On March 1, 2014, Wall recorded a then career-high 16 assists, along with 17 points, 3 rebounds, and 2 steals, in a 122–103 victory over the Philadelphia 76ers.

Wall averaged 19.3 points, 8.8 assists, and 4.1 rebounds on the season as the Wizards finished as the fifth seed in the East and qualified for the playoffs for the first time in six years. They went on to defeat the Chicago Bulls 4 games to 1 in their first round playoff matchup. After defeating the Bulls, Wall and the Wizards lost in the second round to the Indiana Pacers in 6 games.

==== All-Defensive selection (2014–15) ====
On December 8, 2014, Wall recorded 26 points, seven rebounds, three steals and a then career-high 17 assists in a 133–132 double-overtime win over the Boston Celtics. Following the game, Wall dedicated the win to his close friend, six-year-old Damiyah Telemaque-Nelson, who had died of cancer earlier that day. When asked by a reporter "She meant a lot to you, didn't she?", he broke down and started to cry. He later gave her family all of his gear that he wore that night, including his shoes, which had Damiyah's name on them. He went on to tie his career-high of 17 assists, along with 21 points, on December 16 in a 109–95 win over the Minnesota Timberwolves. On January 22, 2015, he was named an Eastern Conference starter for the 2015 NBA All-Star Game, earning his first starting gig after garnering 886,368 votes.

On March 14, 2015, Wall tied his season-high of 31 points while adding 12 assists in a 113–97 win over the Sacramento Kings. On April 3, he recorded 6 points and a then career-high 18 assists in a 101–87 win over the New York Knicks. On April 21, he recorded a Wizards playoff franchise record for assists with 17 as the Wizards defeated the Toronto Raptors 117–106 to take a 2–0 lead in their first-round playoff series. The Wizards went on to win the series with a 4–0 sweep, but lost their second-round series to the Atlanta Hawks in six games. Wall ended the season being selected to the 2nd team All-Defensive.

==== Missing playoffs (2015–16) ====
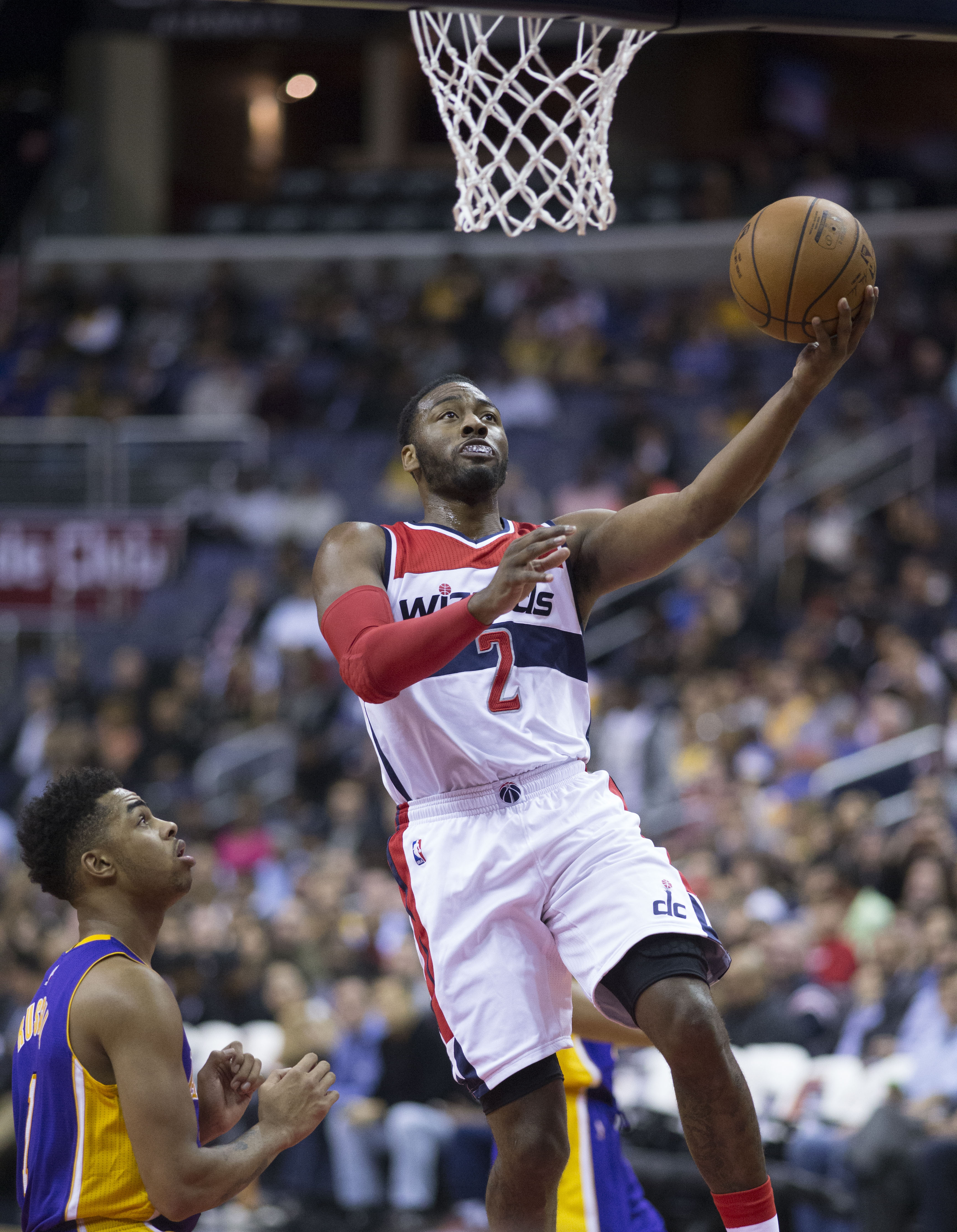
Wall performing a layup

After starting the 2015–16 season with six wins over the first 10 games, the Wizards went on a four-game losing streak between November 24 and November 28. Wall averaged 15.0 points, 5.5 assists and 2.3 steals per game over that losing stretch, and shot just 33.3% from the field. On December 1, Wall recorded a then season-high 35 points, 10 assists and 5 steals in a 97–85 win over the Cleveland Cavaliers, breaking the Cavaliers 9–0 unbeaten streak at home to begin the season, and broke the Wizards' four-game losing streak. Following the win over the Cavaliers, Wall stated, "Every team is trying to make me make jump shots this year, so I was just being aggressive and getting to the basket. I got into a rhythm early and it helped us get going." Wall's shooting percentage over the first 14 games of the season was a career worst (.390), as was his 16.1 point average. The next day, in a loss to the Los Angeles Lakers, Wall recorded his first career back-to-back 30-point, 10-assist game, finishing the game with 34 points and 11 assists.

On December 21, Wall recorded 12 points and a career-high 19 assists in a 113–99 win over the Sacramento Kings. On December 30, in a loss to the Toronto Raptors, Wall recorded his seventh straight double-double and 17th of the season. He averaged 22.6 points and 11.7 assists in 16 December games. He subsequently earned NBA Eastern Conference Player of the Month honors for December. On January 16, he recorded a season-high 36 points, 13 assists and 7 steals against the Boston Celtics, but missed a potential tying layup at the buzzer, as the Wizards were defeated 119–117. He topped his season-high mark on February 3, scoring 41 points in a 134–121 loss to the Golden State Warriors. Two days later, he recorded his fourth career triple-double with 18 points, a career-high 13 rebounds and 10 assists in a 106–94 win over the Philadelphia 76ers. On February 23, he recorded his second triple-double of the season and fifth of his career with 16 points, 12 rebounds and 11 assists in a 109–89 win over the New Orleans Pelicans. On March 16, he recorded his third triple-double of the season with 29 points, 12 assists and 10 rebounds in a 117–96 win over the Chicago Bulls. The next day, he recorded his second straight triple-double with 16 points, 14 assists and 13 rebounds in a 99–94 win over the Philadelphia 76ers.

==== All-NBA selection (2016–17) ====
Following off-season surgery on both knees, Wall was rested in the second of back-to-back night games early on in the 2016–17 season, as a way of limiting his minutes. With eight assists against the Houston Rockets on November 7, Wall broke Wes Unseld's franchise record (3,822) for career assists. On November 21, he recorded 18 points, a then season-high 15 assists and three blocked shots in a 106–101 win over the Phoenix Suns. By late November, his minutes restriction was lifted. On December 6, he scored a career-high 52 points in a 124–116 loss to the Orlando Magic. He made 18-of-31 from the field and added eight assists. With seven steals against the Charlotte Hornets on December 14, Wall became Washington's franchise leader in steals, surpassing Greg Ballard (762). On December 26, he had 18 points and a then season-high 16 assists in a 107–102 win over the Milwaukee Bucks. On January 2, 2017, he was named Eastern Conference Player of the Week for games played Monday, December 26 through Sunday, January 1. He led the Wizards to a 3–0 week while averaging 24.3 points (eighth in the East), an NBA-leading 13.0 assists, 5.3 rebounds and 2.67 steals (second in the East). A day later, he was named Eastern Conference Player of the Month for December.

On January 6, 2017, Wall recorded 18 points and a season-high 18 assists in a 112–105 win over the Minnesota Timberwolves. Later that month, he was named an Eastern Conference All-Star reserve for the 2017 NBA All-Star Game. On February 28, 2017, he tied his career high with 19 assists in a 112–108 win over the Golden State Warriors. On March 11, 2017, he scored 39 points in a 125–124 overtime win over the Portland Trail Blazers. Two days later, he was named Eastern Conference Player of the Week for games played Monday, March 6 through Sunday, March 12. Wall led the Wizards to a 4–0 week, with all of Washington's wins coming on the road. He paced the East in scoring (29.8 ppg) and assists (11.3 apg) while adding 3.3 rebounds and 1.5 steals. On March 17, he set a new career high with 20 assists to go with 14 points in a 112–107 win over the Chicago Bulls. On April 2, Wall had 15 points and 11 assists in a 139–115 loss to Golden State. As a result, he set the single-season franchise assists record with No. 802 in the third quarter, topping Rod Strickland's 1997–98 record of 801.

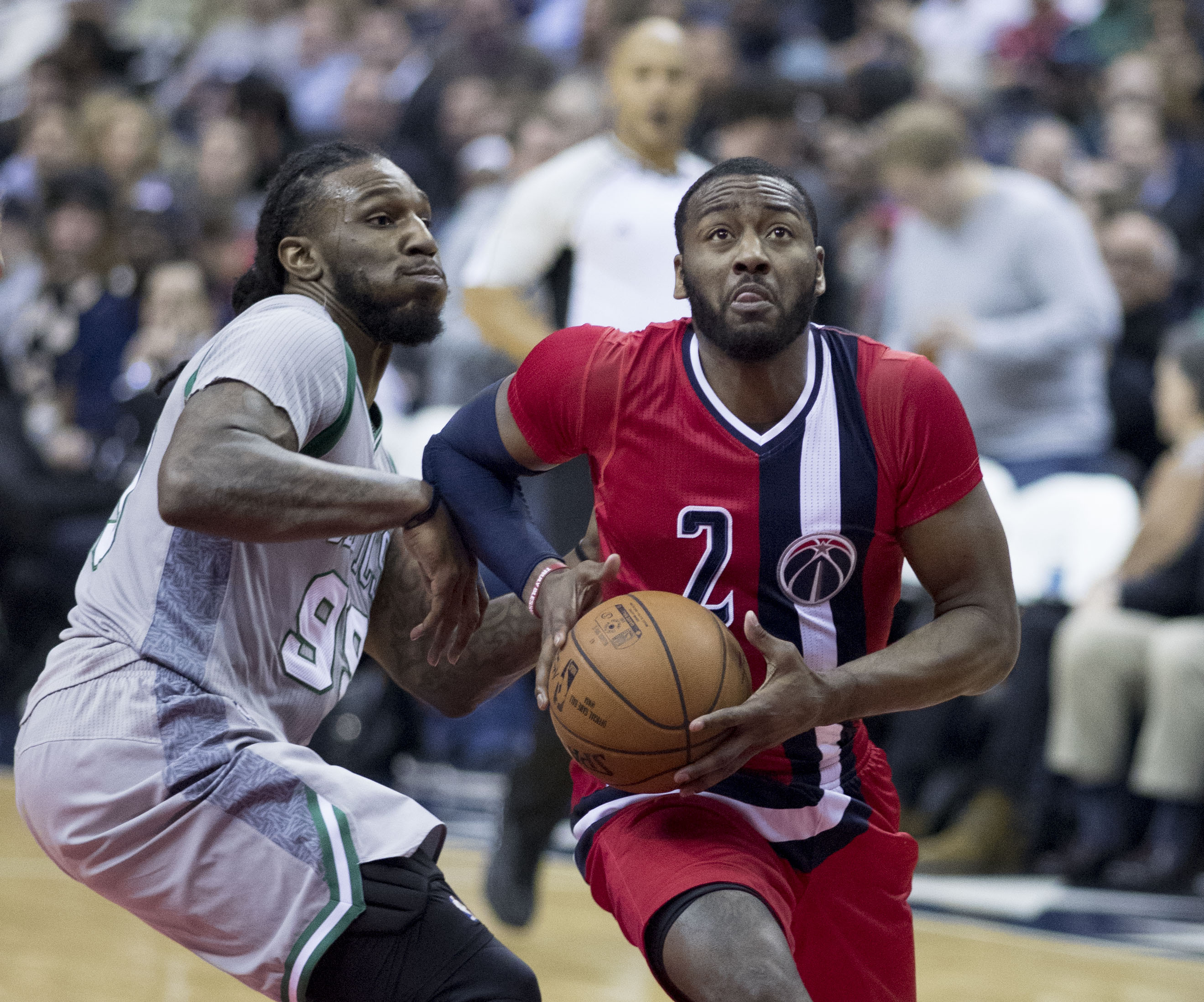
Wall attacking the basket versus the Boston Celtics in 2017

On April 16, Wall scored a playoff career-high 32 points in a 114–107 win over the Atlanta Hawks in Game 1 of their first-round series. In Game 6 of the series on April 28, Wall set a new playoff career with 42 points to help the Wizards eliminate the Hawks with a 115–99 victory, capturing the opening-round series 4–2. On May 12, he helped the Wizards avoid elimination and force a Game 7 in their second-round series against the Boston Celtics after hitting the game-winning 3-pointer with 3.5 seconds left in Game 6, lifting the Wizards to a 92–91 win. He finished the game with 26 points. The Wizards went on to lose Game 7 despite Wall's 18 points and 11 assists, as they bowed out of the playoffs with a 4–3 defeat.

==== Injury-plagued years (2017–2020) ====
On July 26, 2017, Wall signed a four-year, $170 million contract extension with the Wizards. Wall missed nine games in late November and early December with a knee injury; the Wizards went 4–5 in that time. On January 6, he recorded 16 points and a season-high 16 assists against the Milwaukee Bucks. On January 12, he scored 30 points in a 125–119 win over the Orlando Magic, becoming the youngest player (27 years, 128 days) in franchise history to reach 10,000 points for his career. The next day, he scored 17 of his 23 points in the second half and overtime, and tied a season high with 16 assists in the Wizards' 119–113 victory over the Brooklyn Nets. On January 30, 2018, he was sidelined for the next six-to-eight weeks due to his troublesome left knee requiring surgery. He missed two months with the injury, returning to action on March 31 against the Charlotte Hornets and recording 15 points and 14 assists in a 107–93 win. On April 10, he recorded 29 points and 12 assists in a 113–101 win over the Boston Celtics, thus surpassing 5,000 career assists. In Game 3 of the Wizards' first-round playoff series against the Toronto Raptors, Wall recorded 28 points and 14 assists, as the Wizards cut the series deficit to 2–1 with a 122–103 win. In Game 4, Wall recorded 27 points and 14 assists in a 106–98 win, helping the Wizards tie the series at 2–2. The Wizards went on to lose the series in six games despite Wall's 23 points and eight assists in a 102–92 loss in Game 6.

On November 26, 2018, in a 135–131 overtime win over the Houston Rockets, Wall passed Wes Unseld for third place on the franchise career scoring list. On December 16, he recorded 40 points and 14 assists in a 128–110 win over the Los Angeles Lakers. On December 29, he was ruled out for the rest of the season with a left heel injury. After initially undergoing season-ending surgery on his left heel in January 2019, Wall developed an infection in the incision from that surgery, then suffered a ruptured left Achilles tendon when he slipped and fell in his home. He was subsequently ruled out for 12 months.

On March 11, 2020, the 2019–20 NBA season was suspended as a result of the COVID-19 pandemic. Despite the season resuming in July at the NBA Bubble in Orlando, Florida, which exceeded Wall's 12-month timetable of recovery, he did not travel with the Wizards, officially ending his season.

=== Houston Rockets (2020–2022) ===
On December 2, 2020, Wall, along with a 2023 lottery-protected first-round pick, were traded to the Houston Rockets for Russell Westbrook. On March 22, 2021, Wall logged his eighth career triple-double with 19 points, 11 rebounds and 10 assists in a 117–99 win over the Toronto Raptors, ending the team's 20-game losing streak. It was his first triple-double since 2016. On April 26, Wall was ruled out for the remainder of the season after suffering a grade 2 hamstring strain.

In 2021–22, Wall and the Rockets reached a mutual decision for him not to play, as the team was rebuilding and developing young guards Kevin Porter Jr. and Jalen Green. On June 28, 2022, Wall and the Rockets reached a contract buyout agreement.

=== Los Angeles Clippers (2022–2023) ===
On July 8, 2022, Wall signed with the Los Angeles Clippers on a two-year, $13.2 million contract. Wall made his debut with the Clippers on October 20, where he put up 15 points, four rebounds, and three assists in a 103–97 win over the Los Angeles Lakers. On January 13, 2023, in what ended up being his final NBA game, Wall scored 16 points off the bench in a 115–103 loss to the Denver Nuggets. He played 34 games (three starts) for the Clippers and averaged 11.4 points, 2.7 rebounds, and 5.2 assists.

On February 9, Wall was traded back to the Houston Rockets in a three-team trade involving the Memphis Grizzlies. He was waived three days later.

=== Retirement ===
On February 22, 2025, Wall expressed his desire to return to the NBA. On August 19, Wall announced his retirement from professional basketball, to join Amazon Prime Video for its inaugural season broadcasting the NBA for the 2025–26 season.

== National team career ==
In July 2014, Wall was selected as a member of the United States camp roster to compete for the 2014 FIBA Basketball World Cup team. Due to off-season knee surgery, Wall withdrew his name from consideration for USA Basketball's 2016 Rio Olympics team.

== Player profile ==
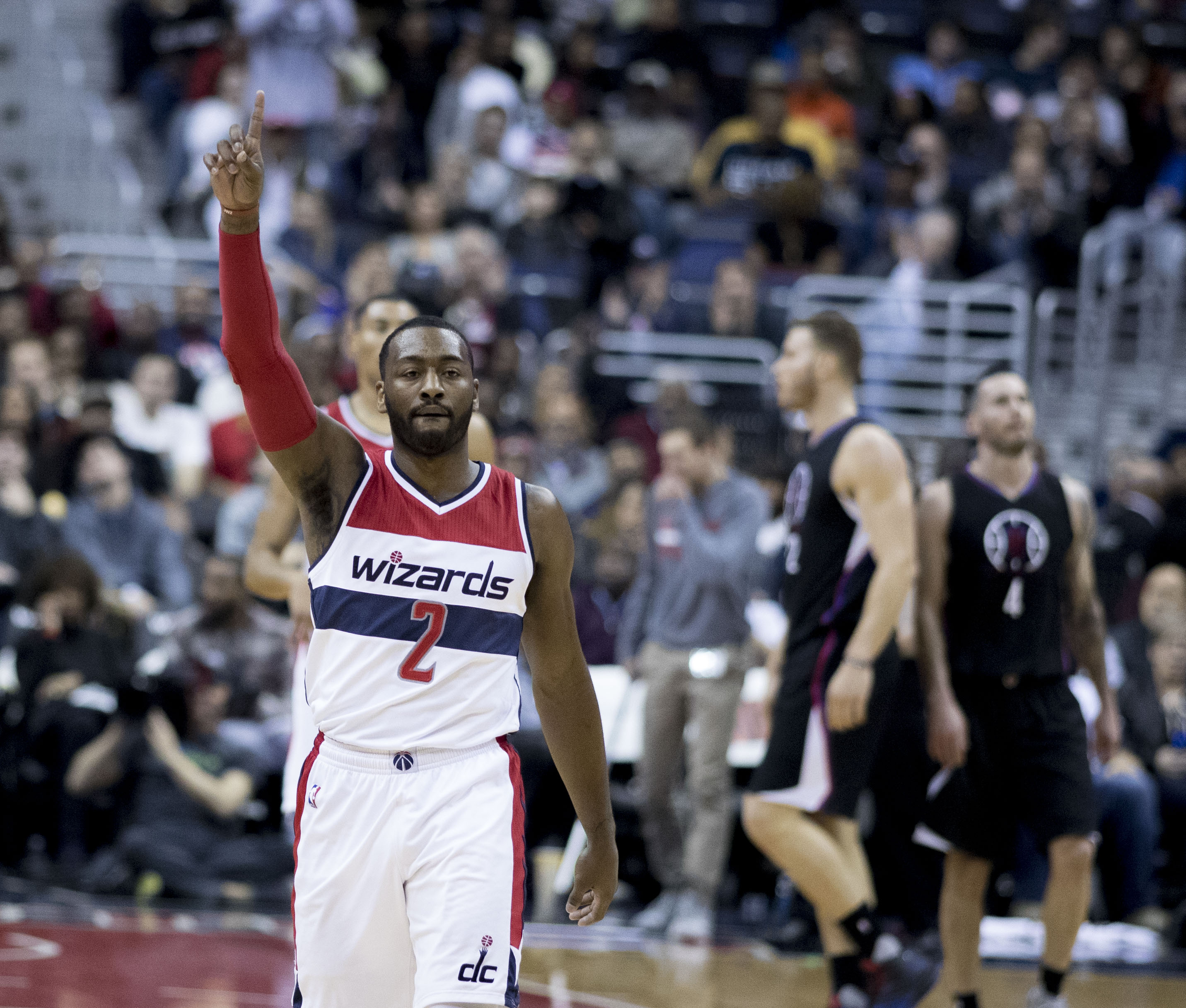
Wall celebrates victory in 2016

Wall is known for being one of the NBA's fastest players. His results at the draft combine of 10.84 seconds in the lane agility drill (combine best that year) and 3.14 seconds in the 3/4 court sprint (second-best that year) demonstrated his horizontal and vertical quickness. Despite only being a point guard-average 6 feet 4 inches (1.93 m) listed height in shoes and 6 feet 2.75 inches (1.90 m) barefoot, Wall has a 6 feet 9.25 inches (2.06 m) wingspan, slightly larger than the average for a point guard.

Relying on his speed, Wall focuses on driving to the basket and sparking fast transition play. He is also a skilled passer, averaging over 10 assists a game for the 2014 through 2017 seasons, and 9.2 overall for his career. In the earlier stages of his time in the NBA, Wall was criticized for the amount of turnovers he committed, being dubbed "very turnover prone". While increasing his assist to turnover ratio in later years, Wall's TOPG has increased to 4.1, his mark at the conclusion of the 2017 season. Despite Wall's shooting percentages hovering slightly below league average except for free throw shooting (League average is .458/.364/.765 while Wall shoots .433/.321/.790), he has seen his shooting largely improve throughout his NBA career.

John Wall is ambidextrous even though he shoots right-handed. He is most noted to make one handed and one-footed dunks off the right leg and with the left hand because he couldn't jump as high off the left leg.

== Personal life ==
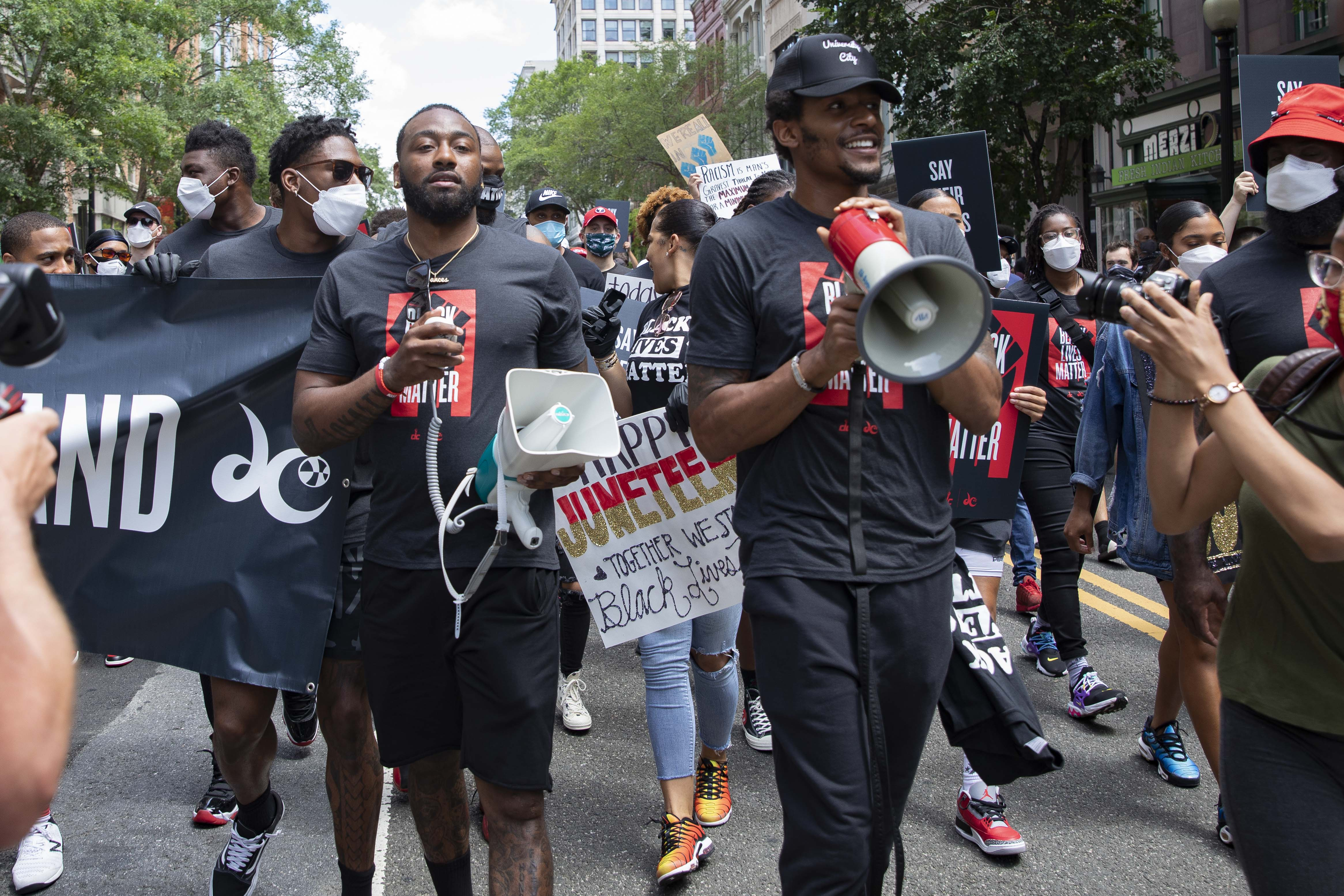
Wall (center-left) at a 2020 Black Lives Matter rally

Wall has two children, the younger of whom was born in 2018.

In 2018, he said he was pursuing a bachelor's degree in business administration.

Wall's mother, Frances Pulley, died of breast cancer on December 13, 2019.

Wall is a fan of the Dallas Cowboys, which was his mother's favorite American football team as well.

In August 2022, Wall publicly revealed that he had contemplated suicide in the previous years, following a series of emotional and physical struggles, including his Achilles tendon injury, the death of his mother and grandmother a year apart from each other, and the toll of the COVID-19 pandemic on his mental health. In the same occasion, he also stated that, after reaching out to his friends, he had sought psychotherapy in order to improve his condition. He further elaborated on the subject in a full-length essay for The Players' Tribune, published the following month.

=== Business ventures and philanthropy ===
Wall signed a five-year endorsement deal worth $25 million with Reebok in 2010, then moved to Reebok's parent company Adidas in 2013. He signed another five-year deal with Adidas in 2018. In May 2017, Wall signed on as a brand ambassador for New Era caps.

In 2013, after signing a five-year contract with the Washington Wizards, Wall purchased a home in Potomac for $4.9 million. The two-acre property, which has eight bedrooms, six garages, and 17,980 square feet, was selected to accommodate Wall's mother, siblings, and guests.

In 2016, Wall received the Stewart B. McKinney Award for his work to end homelessness after he donated $400,000 to Bright Beginnings.

In November 2020, Wall became a co-owner of the South East Melbourne Phoenix, a team in the Australian National Basketball League.

On April 30, 2026, Wall was hired to serve as the president of basketball operations at Howard University.

== Career statistics ==
Legend
GP	Games played	GS	Games started	MPG	Minutes per game
FG%	Field goal percentage	3P%	3-point field goal percentage	FT%	Free throw percentage
RPG	Rebounds per game	APG	Assists per game	SPG	Steals per game
BPG	Blocks per game	PPG	Points per game	**Bold**	Career high
*	Led the league

=== NBA ===
==== Regular season ====
Year	Team	GP	GS	MPG	FG%	3P%	FT%	RPG	APG	SPG	BPG	PPG
2010–11	Washington	69	64	**37.8**	.409	.296	.766	4.6	8.3	1.8	.5	16.4
2011–12	Washington	66*	66*	36.2	.423	.071	.789	4.5	8.0	1.4	.9	16.3
2012–13	Washington	49	42	32.7	.441	.267	.804	4.0	7.6	1.3	.8	18.5
2013–14	Washington	**82**	**82***	36.3	.433	.351	**.805**	4.1	8.8	1.8	.5	19.3
2014–15	Washington	79	79	35.9	.445	.300	.785	4.6	10.0	1.7	.6	17.6
2015–16	Washington	77	77	36.2	.424	.351	.791	**4.9**	10.2	1.9	.8	19.9
2016–17	Washington	78	78	36.4	**.451**	.327	.801	4.2	**10.7**	**2.0**	.6	**23.1**
2017–18	Washington	41	41	34.4	.420	**.371**	.726	3.7	9.6	1.4	**1.1**	19.4
2018–19	Washington	32	32	34.5	.444	.302	.697	3.6	8.7	1.5	.9	20.7
2020–21	Houston	40	40	32.2	.404	.317	.749	3.2	6.9	1.1	.8	20.6
2022–23	L.A. Clippers	34	3	22.2	.408	.303	.681	2.7	5.2	.8	.4	11.4
Career		647	604	34.9	.430	.322	.776	4.2	8.9	1.6	.7	18.7
All-Star		4	1	21.2	.612	.333	1.000	4.2	4.5	2.2	.0	16.2

==== Playoffs ====
Year	Team	GP	GS	MPG	FG%	3P%	FT%	RPG	APG	SPG	BPG	PPG
2014	Washington	11	11	38.2	.366	.219	.765	4.0	7.1	1.6	.7	16.3
2015	Washington	7	7	**39.0**	.391	.176	.846	4.7	**11.9***	1.4	**1.4**	17.4
2017	Washington	**13**	**13**	**39.0**	**.452**	**.344**	.839	3.7	10.3	1.7	1.2	**27.2**
2018	Washington	6	6	**39.0**	.441	.190	**.851**	**5.7**	11.5	**2.3**	1.3	26.0
Career		37	37	38.8	.419	.267	.822	4.3	9.8	1.7	1.1	21.9

=== College ===
Year	Team	GP	GS	MPG	FG%	3P%	FT%	RPG	APG	SPG	BPG	PPG
2009–10	Kentucky	37	37	34.8	.461	.325	.754	4.3	6.5	1.8	.5	16.6

== Awards and honors ==
NBA

- 5× NBA All-Star: 2014, 2015, 2016, 2017, 2018
- All-NBA Third Team: 2017
- NBA All-Defensive Second Team: 2015
- NBA All-Rookie First Team: 2011
- Rising Stars Challenge MVP: 2011
- NBA Slam Dunk Contest champion (2014)
- NBA Community Assist Award (2015–16) (October, Season-long)

College

- SEC Player of the Year
- All-SEC First Team
- SEC All-Freshman Team
- SEC All-Tournament MVP
- SEC All-Tournament Team
- NABC Division I All-District 21 First Team
- NABC Division I All-America First Team
- USBWA All-America Freshman of the Year
- USBWA All-America First Team
- USBWA All-District IV Player of the Year
- USBWA All-District IV Team
- AP NCAA All-America First Team
- AP NCAA All-America Co-Freshman of the Year
- Sporting News NCAA All-America First Team

== See also ==
- John Wall dance
- List of National Basketball Association players with most steals in a game
