= Frank Clyde Brown =

Frank Clyde Brown (October 16, 1870 – June 3, 1943) was an American academic, university administrator, and pioneer collector of folk songs and folklore from the southeastern United States.

== Career ==
Brown was born in Harrisonburg, Virginia, and gained an A.B. degree from the University of Nashville in Tennessee in 1893. He then studied English literature at the University of Chicago, where he gained an M.A. in 1902 and Ph.D. in 1908. The following year, he was appointed professor of English at Trinity College in Durham, North Carolina, where he became known as "Bull" Brown. He wrote a biography of the 17th-century poet and playwright Elkanah Settle, published in 1910, and as a teacher became noted for his work as an interpreter of Shakespeare.

He was encouraged by John A. Lomax, president of the American Folklore Society, to set up the North Carolina Folklore Society in 1913, an organisation of which he was the inaugural president, and later secretary. Over the next thirty years he became the society's principal collector of folk songs and lore, and traveled around the region, often on summer expeditions to isolated areas, with recording equipment powered by a gasoline generator. Initially he recorded material on an Ediphone, using wax cylinders, and later used a Presto machine for recording onto aluminum discs. He took particular note of previously-unwritten ballads and songs, and in 1915 published Ballad Literature in North Carolina. However, "he was never able to stop collecting long enough to actually assemble his material." The Frank Clyde Brown Collection of North Carolina Folklore, eventually published after his death, contained seven volumes comprising some 38,000 items including ballads, songs, games, rhymes, beliefs, customs, riddles, proverbs, tales, legends, superstitions, and speech, taken from the southeastern United States, particularly North Carolina, and has been described as "the most imposing monument ever erected in this country to the common memory of the people of any single state."

In 1921 Brown was appointed head of the English department at Trinity College. After 1924, he was also involved in administering the foundation of Duke University, serving as its first comptroller in 1926, and later as the new university's marshal. As liaison officer with architects and contractors, he assumed a supervisory role alongside Trinity's President, William P. Few, and is credited with contributing many ideas to the university's building plans, including its use of the then newly discovered Hillsborough stone.

== Personal life ==
Brown was married twice: to Ola Marguerite Hollis from 1893 until her death in 1928; and from 1932 to Mary Henkel Wadsworth. He died, aged 72, in 1943.
