= Summertime's Calling Me =

Single by The Catalinas
- A-side: "Summertime's Calling Me"
- Released: December 1975
- Recorded: December 1975
- Genre: Beach Music
- Length: 2:53 (single version); 3:07 (album version)
- Label: Sugarbush Records (#114)
- Songwriter(s): Johnny Barker; Wayne Jurnegan
- Producer(s): Johnny Barker
- The Sugarbush single release is shorter than the version released now (which runs 3:07) and the organ is more pronounced in the single version.

Summertime's Calling Me is a song written by Johnny Barker (September 8, 1945-October 25, 2023), then of the beach music band The Catalinas, in December 1975. Originally released as a 45rpm single on Sugarbush Records, the song initially had slow growth on the beach music scene. Today, however, it is regarded as one of the most influential and favorite beach music songs of all time (ranging between #s 4-7 depending on the source).
