= The Catalinas =

American beach music band

The Catalinas are an American beach music band from the late 1950s.

Since the Catalinas formed in Charlotte, North Carolina, in late 1957, over 60 guitarists, keyboardists, trumpet players, drummers, bass players and singers have been a part of the band. Most have come from communities along the Interstate 77 corridor from Statesville to Charlotte.

Gary Barker, a Statesville resident who plays guitar and sings, is the current leader of the band. He started with the band in 1965, and has been the steadying influence for the last thirty years.

Barker attributes the band's long success to the ongoing popularity of beach music and the great tunes that the band has composed and recorded over the years. Some of their classics include, "You Haven't The Right", "Carolina Moon" and their signature song "Summertime's Calling Me" from 1975.

The band's lead vocalist, Tommy Black, died in a plane crash in 1968. Member Ronnie Gittens died in 2005.

In 1995, the Catalinas were inducted into the Carolina Beach Music Hall of Fame. In 2013, the Catalinas were inducted into the North Carolina Music Hall of Fame.
