= Batesville =

Batesville may refer to:

== Places in the United States ==
- Batesville, Alabama
- Batesville, Arkansas
- Batesville, Georgia
- Batesville, Indiana
- Batesville, Mississippi
- Batesville, Missouri
- Batesville, Ohio
- Batesville, South Carolina
- Batesville, Texas
- Batesville, Virginia

== Education ==
- Batesville School District
- Batesville High School (Arkansas)
- Batesville High School (Indiana)

== Other uses ==
- Batesville Casket Company
