= Prezell Robinson =

American educator (1920–2026)

Prezell Russell Robinson

President of Saint Augustine's University
- In office February 1967 – March 1995
- Preceded by: James A. Boyer
- Succeeded by: Bernard W. Franklin

Personal details
- Born: Prezell Russell Robinson; August 25, 1920 Batesville, South Carolina, U.S.
- Died: June 29, 2026 (aged 105) Raleigh, North Carolina, U.S.
- Occupation: Academic and university administrator

Prezell Russell Robinson (August 25, 1920 – June 29, 2026) was an American sociologist, educator, and university administrator. He was the longest-serving president of Saint Augustine's University in Raleigh, North Carolina, leading the institution from February 1967 to his retirement in March 1995.

== Life and career ==
Robinson graduated from the private high school of Voorhees Junior College, later Voorhees University, in Denmark, South Carolina. He then completed a bachelor's degree in history and social science from Saint Augustine's College (later University) in 1946, followed by a master's degree in social science and educational psychology and a doctor of education in sociology and educational administration from Cornell University. In 1956, he joined Saint Augustine's College as a dean and professor of sociology, with promotion to executive dean in 1964. On June 1, 1966, Robinson became the institution's acting president, formally assuming the presidency on February 27, 1967.

During his long tenure as president of Saint Augustine's, Robinson was noted for developing his institution's academic offerings and physical plant while simultaneously maintaining its financial stability. He oversaw construction of many of the institution's major buildings, including its library, along with establishing a student-run television and radio station. Robinson served as president of the United Negro College Fund (UNCF), along with representing the United States on several diplomatic missions to African nations. He died on June 29, 2026, aged 105.
