= David Spriggs (American football) =

American football player

Profile
- Position: Quarterback

Personal information
- Born: c. 1956

Career information
- College: Cypress Junior College (1976): New Mexico State (1977–1978)

David Spriggs (born c. 1956) is an American former college football quarterback. He played for the New Mexico State Aggies in 1977 and 1978. He began his college career at Cypress Junior College, tallying 1,4000 passing yards in 1976. He transferred to New Mexico State and was the team's third-string quarterback in 1977. As a senior in 1978, he ranked among the leading quarterbacks in major-college football with 25 passing interceptions (1st), 465 total plays (2nd), 2,558 passing yards (3rd), 2,802 total yards (3rd), 232.5 yards gained per game played (3rd), 17 passing touchdowns (5th), 169 pass completions (6th), 317 pass attempts (7th), and 8.1 passing yards per attempt (10th). Spriggs was named MVC offensive payer of the year at the end of the 1978 season. He signed with the New Orleans Saints, but he was cut in July 1979.
