= Dianne Boardley Suber =

American academic administrator

10th President of St. Augustine's University
- In office December 1999 – April 7, 2014
- Succeeded by: Everett B. Ward

Personal details
- Education: Hampton Institute; University of Illinois Urbana-Champaign; Virginia Tech

Dianne Boardley Suber is an American academic administrator who was the tenth president of Saint Augustine's University from 1999 to 2014. She was previously an assistant provost at Hampton University.

== Life ==
Suber received a Bachelor of Science degree in early childhood education from Hampton Institute. She earned a master's of education degree in curriculum development from the University of Illinois Urbana-Champaign. For seven years, she was an elementary school principal. She was a classroom teacher in Greensboro, North Carolina from 1971 to 1972. From 1973 to 1977 she was a classroom teacher in Newport News, Virginia. Suber was an assistant principal in Newport News from 1977 to 1983 when she was promoted to public school principal in 1983. She worked as a program development specialist from 1989 to 1991 when she became a pilot school principal. From 1992 to 1994, she served as dean of administrative services including the registrar, admissions, and financial aid at Hampton University. Suber later served as the vice president for administrative services and assistant provost.

She completed an Ed.D. in educational administration from Virginia Polytechnic Institute and State University. Her dissertation 1996 dissertation was titled, A Descriptive Study of the Factors Identified in the Initiation and Transition of Individuals into a New Superintendency. Houston Conley and Robert Richards served as her co-chairs. Suber was the tenth president of Saint Augustine's University. She assumed the presidency of the college in December 1999. She was its first female president. The board of trustees let her go on April 7, 2014.

== Personal life ==
Suber's husband, Robert Brevard Suber Sr. died of cancer on August 29, 1995.
