= Vin Lananna =

American track and field coach (born 1953)

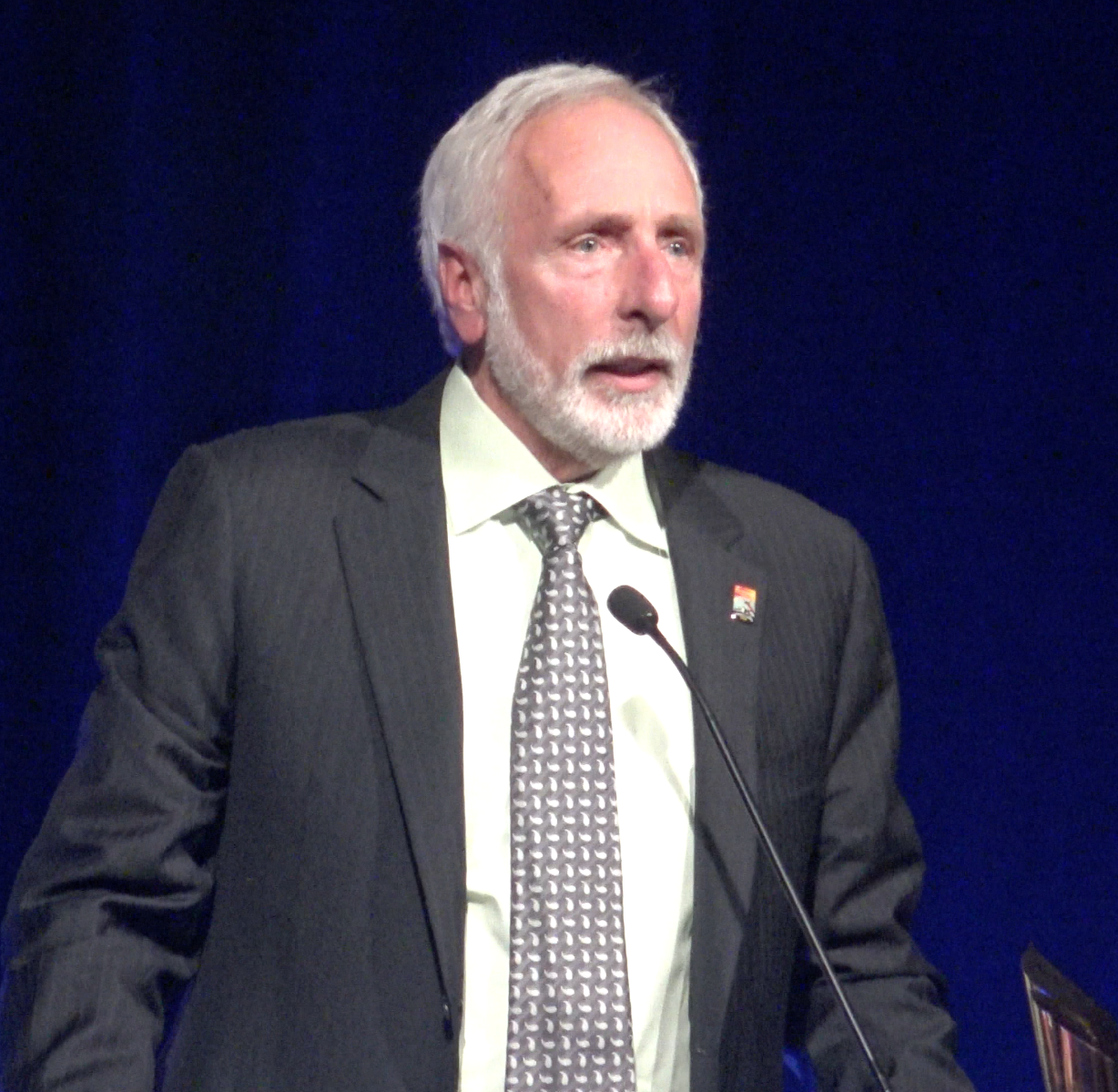
- Vin Lananna at the 2015 USATF Convention

Personal information
- Nationality: American
- Born: June 17, 1953 (age 73) Greenvale, New York, U.S.
- Height: 6 ft 2 in (1.88 m)

Sport
- Sport: Track and field
- College team: C.W. Post '75; Long Island University '89
- Club: Nike
- Turned pro: 1975

Vin Lananna (born June 17, 1953) is an American track and field coach and the chief executive officer of the USA Track & Field Foundation. He coached collegiate teams included the Dartmouth Big Green, the Stanford Cardinal and the Oregon Ducks. He has served as national team coach for the 2011 World Championships in Athletics and the 2016 Rio Olympics. He was included in the 2012 USTFCCCA Hall of Fame as a coach.

== Athletic career ==
As an athlete (1971–75), Lananna ran cross country and track and field and was captain of the 1974 C.W. Post College team that finished fourth in the NCAA Division II Championships.

== Coaching career ==
=== C.W. Post College ===
In 1975, Lananna was named head coach of cross country at his alma mater. Lananna was inducted in the school's Athletic Hall of Fame in 2007.

=== Dartmouth College ===
Lananna served as assistant athletic director and head coach for Dartmouth Big Green cross country and track and field. In 12 seasons with the Dartmouth College Big Green, Lananna's team appeared at the NCAA Cross Country Championships every year - including two straight runner-up finishes for the men's team in 1986 and 1987.

=== Stanford University ===
From 1992 to 2003, Lananna built one of the NCAA's elite programs. His cross country and track and field teams claimed five NCAA Division I team championships. Stanford Cardinal track and field produced 35 top-10 NCAA finishes, and 22 NCAA individual titles.

=== Nike Farm Team ===
In 1994, Lananna served as president and co-founder of the Nike Farm Team, a post-collegiate program for corporately funded professional middle distance and distance athletes based at Stanford.

=== Oberlin College ===
Lananna served as athletic director for two years from 2003 to 2005. Lananna led the revitalization and reorganization of the department of athletics and physical education. His efforts to improve fundraising and enhance the department's resources allowed Oberlin to increase staffing and upgrade facilities, including the construction of a new stadium for soccer, lacrosse, and track and field.

=== University of Oregon ===
In July 2005, Lananna's leadership helped the Oregon Ducks track and field and Eugene, Oregon win the right to host the 2008 US Olympic Trials (track and field). In July 2006, a two-year renovation began to prepare Historic Hayward Field to host exciting track and field meets in the United States. Lananna has also led the establishment of a new post-collegiate club, the Oregon Track Club Elite, which provides a new opportunity for middle distance/distance athletes to train with the goal of being competitive on the world stage. Named Associate Athletic Director at the University of Oregon in July 2005, Lananna has been responsible for creating a vision for the Oregon track and field program and Historic Hayward Field.

=== University of Virginia ===
Lananna was named Director of Track and Field and Cross Country and Associate Athletics Director for Administration at the University of Virginia in September 2019.

=== Team USA ===
Lananna served as the United States head coach for the 1990 IAAF World Cross Country Championships and 1996 IAAF World Cross Country Championships.

Lananna also led the East team to a track and field title at the 1990 U.S. Olympic Festival and was an assistant coach for Team USA at the 1999 IAAF World Indoor Championships.

Lananna served as the 2004 U.S. Olympic Team men's middle distance coach.

Lananna served as the head men's coach for Team USA at the 2011 IAAF World Track & Field Championships in Daegu, South Korea.

Lananna served as the head men's coach for Team USA at the 2016 Summer Olympics in Rio de Janeiro.

== Other positions ==
Lananna served as president of TrackTown USA, Inc. which is a non-profit organization responsible for organizing the 2014 IAAF World Junior Championships, the 2015 USA Track & Field Outdoor Championships, the 2016 IAAF World Indoor Championships and the 2016 U.S. Olympic Team Trials-Track & Field. In 2016, Lananna was elected President of USA Track and Field.

In July 2026, Lananna was appointed chief executive officer of the USA Track & Field Foundation. Having previously served on the foundation's board of directors for more than a decade.
