= George Williams (athletics coach) =

United States track and field coach

George Williams is an American track and field coach who was the head of St. Augustine's University track and field program for 44 years.

== Early life ==
Williams was raised in Overtown, Miami. Williams attended St. Augustine's University as a student in education with an athletics scholarship. He graduated in 1965. From there he tried to become professional basketball player but ended up instead as a teacher at Cary Elementary School. At the school, he came the attention of his old university who offered him a job in Alumni Affairs.

== St. Augustine's University ==
Williams was working as an administrator in the university’s alumni office before taking as, he then thought, an interim position as a track coach.

In his time at St. Augustine's as the head track and field coach, Williams won 39 National Collegiate Athletic Association (NCAA) Division II National Titles - this is reported as the third most amongst NCAA coaches at any level.

In 2020, Williams was removed from his post after 44 years.

== Olympics ==
Williams was an assistant track and field coach for the 1996 United States Olympic team in Atlanta, where each athlete he coached won a gold medal.

In 2004, Williams was the head United States Olympic track and field coach at the 2004 Athens Olympics. He was also men's head coach at the 1999 World Outdoor Championships in Seville, the 1993 World Indoor Championships in Toronto, and the 1992 IAAF World Cup in Havana, Cuba.

== Accolades and awards ==
In 2000, Williams was inducted into the North Carolina Sports Hall of Fame.

In 2022, Williams was honoured with the Legend Coach Award by USA Track & Field (USATF).

Williams is reported to have been inducted into eight other halls of fame in addition to that of North Carolina, including those of the U.S. Track and Field and Cross Country Coaches Association Hall of Fame (USTFCCCA), Central Intercollegiate Athletic Association (CIAA), City of Raleigh and Saint Augustine’s University.
