= USA Track & Field =

US governing body for track and field

- Sport: Track & Field; Long-Distance Running; Race Walking
- Jurisdiction: National
- Abbreviation: USATF
- Founded: 1979; 47 years ago (as The Athletics Congress)
- Affiliation: World Athletics
- Regional affiliation: NACAC
- Headquarters: Indianapolis, Indiana, US
- President: Vin Lananna
- CEO: Max Siegel

Official website
- usatf.org
- (United States)

USA Track & Field (USATF) is a United States national governing body for the sports of track and field, cross country running, road running, and racewalking (known as the sport of athletics outside the US). The USATF was known between 1979 and 1992 as The Athletics Congress (TAC) after its spin-off from the Amateur Athletic Union (AAU), which governed the sport in the US through most of the 20th century until the Amateur Sports Act of 1978 dissolved its responsibility. Based in Indianapolis, USATF is a non-profit organization with a membership of more than 130,000. The organization has three key leadership positions: CEO Max Siegel, Board of Directors Chair Steve Miller, and elected president Vin Lananna. U.S. citizens and permanent residents can be USATF members (annual individual membership fee: $35 for 18-year-old members and younger, $65 for the rest), but permanent residents can only participate in masters events in the country, and they cannot win USATF medals, prize money, or score points for a team, per World Athletics regulations.

USA Track & Field is involved in many aspects of the sport at the local, national, and international level, providing the rules, officials, coaching education, sports science and athlete development, youth programs, masters (age 25+) competition, the National Track and Field Hall of Fame, and an annual meeting. It also organizes the annual USA Track and Field Outdoor Championships, the USA Track & Field Indoor Championships, the USA Cross Country Championships, the USATF National Club Cross Country Championships, and the USATF National Club Track & Field Championships. Through its sanctioning program, the national body provides the insurance coverage necessary for members to rent facilities, thus allowing for competitive opportunities for all athletes to happen. USA Track and Field has held National conventions since the 1870s or 1880s.

== History ==
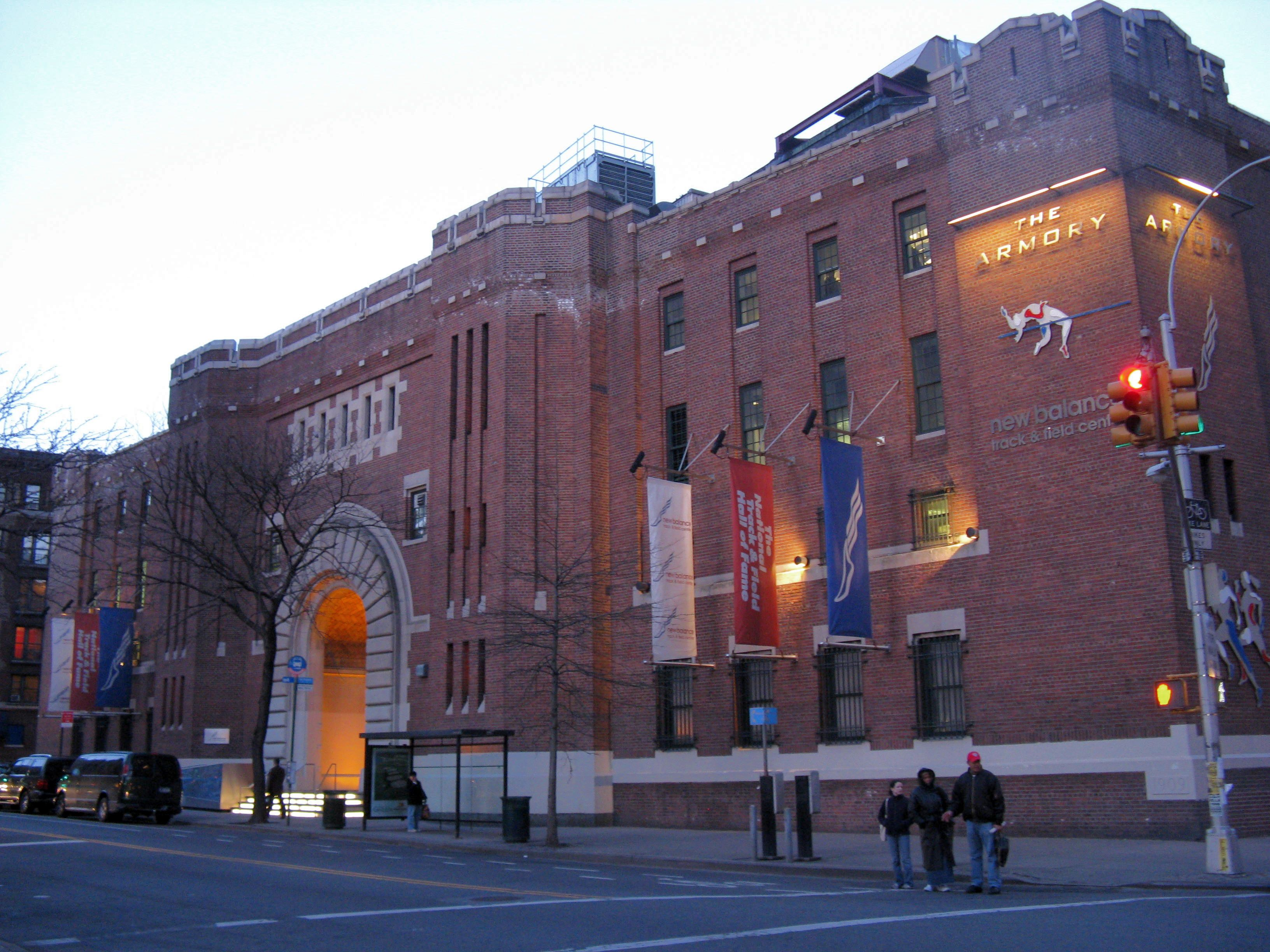
The organization operates the National Track and Field Hall of Fame in the former Fort Washington Avenue Armory in New York City.

On April 22, 1879, the National Association of Amateur Athletes of America (NAAA) was formed. On January 21, 1888, in the city of New York, rower William B. Curtis and runner James Edward Sullivan founded what officially became the Amateur Athletic Union (AAU). The AAU governed the sport of track and field in the United States until 1979, when the Amateur Sports Act of 1978 decreed that the AAU could no longer hold international franchises for more than one sport. The enactment of the Amateur Sports Act was prompted by lobbying by athletes, particularly runners, who felt that the AAU imposed artificial rules preventing widespread participation in sports.

The Athletics Congress (TAC) emerged from the AAU in late 1979; its first annual meeting was conducted in Las Vegas in conjunction with the annual AAU Convention. A constitutional convention was subsequently held in Dallas–Fort Worth in 1980.

In 1992, TAC changed its name to USA Track & Field (USATF) to increase recognition for the organization and for the sport in the United States. USATF inherited from AAU the 57 regional associations that are responsible for promoting the sport in a particular state or locality. Many of these associations were viewed as unaccountable to their members and some were accused of operating in a racially discriminatory manner. In response, the USATF restructured the regional associations and adopted Regulation 15, which set minimum standards for association performance and called for biannual accreditation of each association under those standards.

In May 2008, the United States Olympic Committee notified USATF that its governance was deficient and threatened to remove its national governing body status unless major reforms were made. In response, at USATF's December 2008 convention, the size of its board of directors was reduced from 31 members, who had represented constituencies within the organization, to 15, and none of the new directors could have an operating role in the organization. Most of the new board members represented sponsoring organizations. On February 18, 2009, the members of the new, reduced board were announced.

=== Post-reorganization performance ===
After the restructuring of the board and the hiring of Max Siegel as CEO, USATF in 2016 achieved its highest medal count at an Olympics since 1936 (32) and its most-ever medals at a world championships, winning 30 at the 2017 IAAF World Championships. The organization has seen growth of its budget and sponsor ranks, with the annual budget growing from $22 million to nearly $37 million. In 2016, it established an "Athlete Revenue Distribution Model" that provided additional money to elite athletes.

=== Controversy ===
At the 2014 annual meeting, the member delegates voted 392–70 to re-nominate Robert Hersh as the USATF's nominee to the IAAF Council. At the time, Hersh was the sitting senior vice-president of the IAAF Council and, by virtue of that position, a USATF board member. However, the reconstituted Board disregarded the vote of the member delegates and instead voted 11–1 to nominate president Stephanie Hightower as the nominee to the IAAF Council. The Board's action caused such a controversy that USATF sent an email two days later to all of its members attempting to explain its action. The email said, "This is a different era and a different time. We think Stephanie Hightower provides us with the best chance to move forward as part of that change." Later that summer, at the IAAF Congress, Hightower was elected to the IAAF Council with the most votes of any candidate; all USATF candidates for IAAF positions were elected. In 2018, after serving on the IAAF Council for four years, Hightower came up for reelection. She was defeated by a vote of the delegates in favor of Willie Banks.

In 2016, Vin Lananna was elected president of USATF. On February 18, 2018, Lananna was place on "temporary administrative leave" pending a federal investigation by the Federal Bureau of Investigation and the Internal Revenue Service into possible criminal conflict of interest regarding the awarding of the 2021 World Championships in Athletics to Eugene, Oregon. Lananna was also the longtime president of TrackTown USA, the hosting organization for the World Championships. Lananna was also an Associate Athletic Director at the University of Oregon, the host stadium of the event. Lamine Diack was the IAAF president in April 2015 at the time of the award, and was under house arrest in France on charges of corruption. The 2021 Championships were awarded in an unconventional fashion, without the usual formal bidding process. The selection of the host city was announced on April 16, 2015, in Beijing. Eugene had previously put in a bid for the 2019 World Championships, losing to Qatar. The choice of Eugene made the 2021 event the first held in the United States. Runner's World magazine reported that Eugene's selection by World Athletics, then known as IAAF, was an "unusual move". The event was the second held in North America, after Edmonton, Alberta, Canada, in 2001. The Guardian reported that the lack of bidding triggered concern in European cities that had bid to host the event. They quoted Diack, IAAF president, who justified the lack of bidding with the claim the selection of Eugene to host the event, as saying that it "enables us to take advantage of a unique opportunity to host a financially successful tournament that may never arise again."

The lack of bidding for the 2021 event was not unprecedented: the 2007 World Championships were awarded to Osaka, Japan, without bidding. On July 17, 2018, Lananna also resigned as president of TrackTown USA, but did not leave his position at the university at that time. As of February 18, 2018, the interim USATF president was Mike Conley.

== Affiliations ==
USA Track & Field is the International Association of Athletics Federations (IAAF) member federation in the United States. USATF is a member of the United States Olympic Committee (USOC) and selects teams for Olympic and Pan American Games competitions. To select the athletes for the Olympic Games, every Olympiad USATF conducts the Olympic Trials.

USATF also has membership in, or close affiliations with, the NCAA, the National Federation of State High School Associations (NFHS), the Road Runners Club of America (RRCA), Running USA, and many community-based and disabled sports organizations.

USA Track & Field is a Founding Sports Partner of the Sports Museum of America, joining more than 50 other single-sport Halls of Fame, National Governing Bodies, Museums and other organizations across North America to richly celebrate the history, grandeur and significance of sports in American culture. Set to open in New York City on May 7, 2008, the Sports Museum of America will showcase both USA Track & Field and the National Track & Field Hall of Fame in its Hall of Halls Gallery (along with providing an annual donation) in return for sharing some of the hall of fame's valuable artifacts and their support of the creation of the Nation's first all-sports museum experience.

== Associations ==
USATF is composed of 57 Associations, which are the localized administrative districts. For competition, each association is obligated to conduct (local) association championships. This is the initial rung in the competition tournaments that lead to various national championships, though many national championships do not require participation at the lower level. Generally, the associations follow state borders, but in the cases of smaller states, several states are combined into one association, and in the case of larger states, the state is divided into multiple associations in order to more effectively serve clusters of the population base. Most association borders parallel the initial associations created by the AAU, though there has been some adjustment to those defined borders since, including the creation of new associations. Dependent upon the association fulfilling its obligations to its membership and the number of members in the association, each association is allowed to send a delegation of representatives to the National Meeting in early December each year. This is the primary means through which the local constituents are able to have a voice in the direction the national organization. Individual members may also attend the meetings, though voting is carefully controlled by the by-laws, based on the participation of various constituent groups. The National Meeting is the only time political business, rule changes and record ratification can be transacted by most wings of the organization.

Number	Name	Definition (if not * state borders)	~ Population base
1	Maine	*	1,330,000
2	New England	Massachusetts, New Hampshire, Rhode Island, Vermont	9,750,000
3	Adirondack	Northeastern New York	2,190,000
4	Niagara	Western New York (west of Broome, Cortland, Onondaga and Oswego Counties)	3,910,000
5	Connecticut	*	3,600,000
6	New York	New York City, Dutchess County, Orange County, Putnam County, Rockland County, Sullivan County, Westchester County	9,915,000
7	New Jersey	*	8,940,000
8	Mid-Atlantic	Delaware, Bedford County, Centre County, Clinton County, Huntingdon County, Potter County, Pennsylvania	10,375,000
9	Alabama	*	4,850,000
10	Potomac Valley	Maryland, District of Columbia, Arlington County, Fairfax County, Alexandria, Falls Church, Virginia	8,155,000
11	Three Rivers	Western Pennsylvania (portion not in Mid-Atlantic) and shared jurisdiction of the counties of Brooke, Hancock, Marshall and Ohio Counties in West Virginia (3,525,000)	3,390,000
12	Virginia	Virginia minus Arlington County, Fairfax County, Alexandria, Falls Church	6,810,000
13	North Carolina	*	9,950,000
14	Florida	*	19,750,000
15	Tennessee	*	6,550,000
16	Indiana	*	6,600,000
17	Ohio	Ohio except Lake Erie Association	7,230,000
18	Lake Erie	Ashland, Ashtabula, Carroll, Columbiana, Cuyahoga, Erie, Geauga, Harrison, Holmes, Huron, Jefferson, Lake, Lorain, Mahoning, Medina, Portage, Richland, Stark, Summit, Trumbull, Tuscarawas, and Wayne Counties	4,365,000
19	Michigan	*	9,910,000
20	Wisconsin	*	5,760,000
21	Illinois	Illinois minus Calhoun, Greene, Jersey, Madison, Monroe, St. Clair counties	12,265,000
22	Ozark	Eastern Missouri (including Camden, Dallas, Douglas, Knox, Miller, Monroe, Montgomery, Osage, Ozark, Pike, Ralls, Scotland, Shelby, Webster counties and Calhoun, Greene, Jersey, Madison, Monroe, St. Clair counties Illinois	3,750,000
23	Arkansas	*	2,970,000
24	Southern	Louisiana and Mississippi	7,650,000
25	Gulf	Texas bounded on the north and including Robertson, Leon, Houston, Angelina, Nacogdoches Counties, and Shelby; and on the west by and including Matagorda, Wharton, Colorado, Austin, Washington, Brazos, and Robertson Counties.	6,825,000
26	Southwestern	Texas bounded on the south by and including the Counties of Irion, Tom Green, Concho, McCulloch, San Saba, Mills, Hamilton, Coryell, Bell, Falls, Limestone, Freestone, Anderson, Cherokee, Rusk, and Panola; and on the west by and including the counties of Hardeman, Foard, Knox, Stonewall, Fisher, Scurry, Borden, Howard, Glasscock, and Reagan.	10,250,000
27	Oklahoma	*	3,880,000
28	Missouri Valley	Kansas and western Missouri	5,850,000
29	Nebraska	*	1,880,000
30	Minnesota	*	5,460,000
31	Montana	*	1,025,000
32	Colorado	*	5,355,000
33	USATF Southern California Association	Inyo, Los Angeles, Mono, Orange County, Riverside, San Bernardino Santa Barbara and Ventura Counties in California	19,025,000
34	Utah	*	2,945,000
35	Inland Northwest	Washington east of and including counties of Chelan, Kittitas, Klickitat, Okanogan and Yakima Counties and Idaho north of and including Idaho County	1,755,000
36	Pacific Northwest	Washington west of Inland Northwest	5,605,000
37	Oregon	*	3,970,000
38	Pacific	Northern California including San Luis Obispo, Stanislaus and Tuolumne counties north and Carson City, Churchill, Douglas, Humboldt, Lyon, Mineral, Pershing, Storey, and Washoe Counties in Nevada	13,530,000
39	Hawaii	*	1,420,000
40	Iowa	*	3,110,000
41	Kentucky	*	4,415,000
42	New Mexico	*	2,085,000
43	South Texas	Texas bounded on the east by and including the counties of Milam, Burleson, Lee, Fayette, Lavaca, and Jackson; on the south by the Gulf of Mexico and the Republic of Mexico; on the west by and including the counties of Val Verde and Crockett; and on the north by the counties of Crockett, Schleicher, Menard, Mason, Llano, Burnet, Lampasas, and Williamson.	5,560,000
44	San Diego-Imperial	San Diego and Imperial County, California	3,275,000
45	Georgia	*	10,100,000
46	Central California	Fresno, Kern, Kings, Madera, Mariposa, Merced and Tulare Counties	2,595,000
47	West Texas	Texas bounded on the east by and including the counties of Lipscomb, Hemphill, Wheeler, Collingsworth, Childress, Cottle, King, Kent, Garza, Lynn, Dawson, Martin, Midland, and Upton; on the south by and including the counties of Upton, Crane, Ward, and Loving; on the west by the State of New Mexico; and on the north by the State of Oklahoma	1,175,000
48	Arizona	*	6,730,000
49	Nevada	Clark, Elko, Esmeralda, Eureka Lander, Lincoln, Nye and White Pine Counties in Nevada	2,190,000
50	Wyoming	*	585,000
51	West Virginia	* (shared jurisdiction with Three Rivers in Brooke, Hancock, Marshall and Ohio Counties) (1,715,000)	1,850,000
52	Dakotas	North Dakota and South Dakota	1,600,000
53	Border	Brewster, Culberson, Jeff Davis, El Paso, Hudspeth, Pecos, Presidio, Reeves and Terrell Counties in Texas	855,000
54	Snake River	Idaho south of Idaho County	1,335,000
55	South Carolina	*	4,830,000
56	Alaska	*	740,000
59	Long Island	Nassau County, Suffolk County	2,835,000

== Competitors ==
Many of the more than 130,000 members of USATF participate in athletics competitions through one of the thousands of clubs established in all 50 states. While most of these members participate as athletes, coaches, officials and supporters of athletics at the grassroots level, elite athletes who represent the US in international competition are also required to be members of USATF. USATF also has 57 Associations to promote the sport locally, and membership in USATF also constitutes membership in a local association, with the dues being divided between the national and local group.

During the 1980s and 1990s, USATF encouraged major marathons to require USATF membership as a prerequisite to entering those races. However, all marathons dropped this requirement for non-elite runners, causing the adult membership in USATF to drop dramatically in the 2000s. In some USATF associations, the number of youth members far exceeds the number of adult members.

Today, USATF competes for youth membership with a parallel effort from the AAU, and with road racer/adult recreational runner membership with the Road Runners Club of America (RRCA) and its member clubs. In many cases, youth track clubs join both USATF and AAU so that they can compete in both sets of track meets, and adult running clubs join both RRCA and USATF. However, unlike USATF which requires each individual runner to also become a member of USATF in order to compete in events or gain other membership benefits, when a club joins RRCA, all of its members automatically become members of RRCA as well. As a result, RRCA has grown to 180,000 individual or family members compared with 130,000 USATF members, many of whom are children.

To the general public, the similarity in terminology used by the organizations' events can lead to confusion. For example, both USATF and AAU conduct a series of track meets called the Junior Olympics and USATF, AAU and RRCA conduct separate National Championships and State Championships. Both AAU and USATF operate 57 state or local Associations, although the boundaries of their service areas are no longer exactly the same.

Regarding the funding of promising post-collegiate athletes, USATF competes with RRCA's Road Scholars program to select athletes for stipends.

== Championship series ==
In 1999, the USATF established the Golden Spike Tour – later the Visa Championship Series (VCS) – to showcase track and field in America and to facilitate the broadcast of key events on national television networks. Using innovative meet formats, the VCS helps repackage the sport, draws new fans and new sponsors, and provides increased financial incentives for USATF athletes. The VCS fills indoor arenas and outdoor stadiums across the country. Athletes compete for prize money at each meet, and the top athletes share in a bonus pool of $100,000. The last meet of the season is the USA Track & Field Indoor Championships. Most focus on the USA Track & Field Outdoor Championships to make IAAF World Championships in Athletics and Athletics at the Summer Olympics teams.

== USA Masters Track and Field Championship ==
Masters athletics has several Championship competitions:

1. USATF Masters Outdoor Championships began July 1968 and have been held every year (except 2020).
2. USATF Masters Indoor Championships began March 1975 and have been held every year (except 2020).
3. USA Track and Field is considering (2020) adding the 25-29 age bracket for the USA National Masters Outdoor Track and Field Championship. Age 30-34 is already competing at the USA National Masters Outdoor Track and Field Championship.
4. World Masters Athletics Championships began August 1975 in Canada and continue to today.

== Legend Coach Award ==
The USA Track & Field Legend Coach Award is an annual award to a single recipient selected by the USATF Coaches Advisory Committee.

The award ceremony takes place at the annual USATF Outdoor Championships.

Recipients of the award started in 2014 are:

- 2014 Ed Temple
- 2015 Joe Vigil
- 2016 Tom Tellez
- 2017 Clyde Hart
- 2018 Brooks Johnson
- 2019 Bob Larsen
- 2020 No Award
- 2021 Bill Dellinger
- 2022 George Williams
- 2023 Bobby Kersee
- 2024 Terry Crawford
- 2025 Vin Lananna

== Awards ==
- World Athletics Awards - Member Federation Award: 2024

== See also ==
- Mastersrankings
