= Christine Johnson McPhail =

American academic administrator (1946–2026)

13th President of St. Augustine's University
- In office February 24, 2021 – December 2023
- Preceded by: Irving Pressley McPhail
- Succeeded by: Leslie Rodriguez-McClellon (acting)

Personal details
- Born: February 1, 1946 Tyler, Texas, U.S.
- Died: March 1, 2026 (aged 80) March 1, 2026
- Spouse: Irving Pressley McPhail (m. 1998; died 2020)
- Education: Fresno City College; Fresno State University; University of Southern California

Christine Johnson McPhail (February 1, 1946 – March 1, 2026) was an American academic administrator who was the thirteenth president of St. Augustine's University from 2021 to 2023.

== Life and career ==
McPhail was born in Tyler, Texas, on February 1, 1946, to Mary and Otis Johnson. She would grow up there. Her mother was a homemaker and her father was a sharecropper who later started a small business in Tyler. She attended Emmett Scott High School. McPhail graduated from Fresno City College and earned a bachelor's degree in social work from Fresno State University. She worked for the Economic Opportunities Commission as a social worker for Head Start. She completed a master's degree in education and counseling from Fresno State University.

She began a doctoral program at University of California, Berkeley while working as a counselor at Contra Costa College. She later became an assistant dean of students and was promoted to dean at College of Alameda. With the full-time position, she paused her doctoral studies. She later transferred to a part-time D.Ed. program in higher education at University of Southern California. Her 1987 dissertation was titled, Academically Underprepared Students in the California Community Colleges. Clive Grafton was her doctoral chairperson.

McPhail became president of Cypress College in 1995. She was its first Black and first female president. She stepped down in June 1998 after marrying her husband, Irving Pressley McPhail. She later joined Morgan State University as the founding professor and director of its community college leadership doctoral program. McPhail was later a professor of practice at the John E. Roueche Center for Community College Leadership at Kansas State University. Following the death of her husband due to COVID-19 in October 2020, she was selected to succeed him as the thirteenth president of St. Augustine's University effective February 24, 2021. Her presidency ended in December 2023 and she was succeeded by acting president Leslie Rodriguez-McClellon.

Her death from cancer was announced on March 1, 2026. McPhail was 80.
