= Saint Augustine's University (North Carolina) =

Historically Black college in Raleigh, North Carolina, US

Coordinates: 35.7861°N 78.6204°W

- Former names: Saint Augustine's Normal School (1867–1893); Saint Augustine's School (1893–1928); Saint Augustine's College (1928–2012)
- Motto: Veritas vos liberabit
- Motto in English: The truth will set you free
- Type: Private historically black college
- Established: July 19, 1867; 159 years ago (as normal school); January 19, 1928; 98 years ago (as college)
- Founder: Jacob Brinton Smith
- Accreditation: Unaccredited; SACSCOC until May 2026
- Religious affiliation: Episcopal Church
- President: Verjanis A. Peoples (interim)
- Students: None as of 2026
- Location: Raleigh, North Carolina, United States
- Campus: Urban, approximately 100 acres (0.40 km^{2})
- Colors: Blue and White
- Nickname: Falcons (until 2025)
- Sporting affiliations: None; athletics discontinued. Formerly CIAA (NCAA Division II) until 2025.
- Website: st-aug.edu
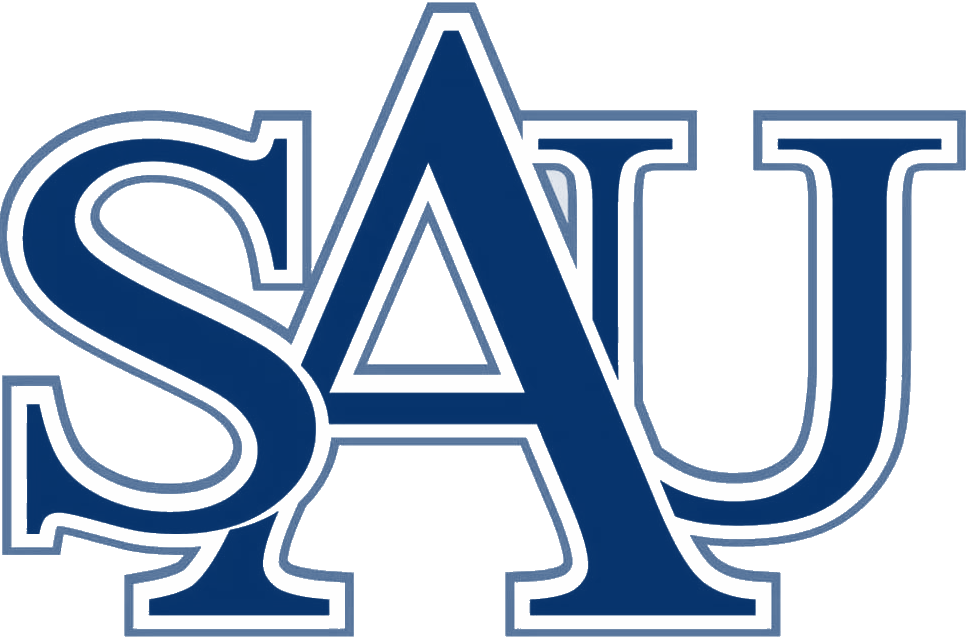

Saint Augustine's University is a private unaccredited historically Black Christian college in Raleigh, North Carolina. In 2026, it filed for bankruptcy and suspended all educational activities. Founded in 1867 by Episcopal Church clergy to educate formerly enslaved Black people, Saint Augustine's has focused its mission around first-generation college students and students "who otherwise wouldn't get the opportunity" to receive a college education. Over its history, it progressively evolved from a normal school to a junior college to a four-year liberal arts institution.

From the early 1990s, Saint Augustine's was challenged by legal problems, low graduation rates, significant enrollment declines, and corresponding revenue shortfalls. Following years of serious financial mismanagement and general instability, the institution's accreditor, the Southern Association of Colleges and Schools Commission on Colleges (SACSCOC) removed it from membership for noncompliance on July 14, 2025 after several appeals, automatically revoking its accreditation. Although a subsequent injunction temporarily secured its provisional accreditation, Saint Augustine's filed for Chapter 11 bankruptcy on April 27, 2026 due to its dire financial situation. The institution discontinued its degree programs and reverted to unaccredited status after May 15, suspending all educational activities from August.

== History ==
The Lyman Building, Saint Augustine's original main administration building, in 1890. It later served as a men's dormitory until its 1959 demolition.

=== Early years ===
Following the Civil War, Episcopal priest Jacob Brinton Smith, the rector of St. Matthew's church in Jersey City, was appointed to the Freedmen's Bureau in North Carolina. Believing in educating newly freed Black people so they could themselves educate their communities, he secured $25,000 from the estate of abolitionist Methodist minister Charles Avery to establish a normal school, with support from Bishop Thomas Atkinson of the Episcopal Diocese of North Carolina. Incorporated as Saint Augustine's Normal School and Collegiate Institute on July 19, 1867, Saint Augustine's opened on January 13, 1868, with Brinton Smith as its first principal. As principal, he insisted on only enrolling students who met his academic standards.

The first classes were held at the state fairgrounds in a former army barrack donated by Major General Oliver Otis Howard, the head of the Freedmen's Bureau. On January 16, 1869, the school moved to its present site, and its first building was dedicated. Brinton Smith died suddenly in October 1872 and was succeeded by John Eston Cooke Smedes. By 1875, less than a decade after the school had been established, 58 alumni had become teachers or pastors. In 1883, fire destroyed all of the classroom buildings, with damage compounded by the lack of response of a White fire company to fight the blaze, which had to be fought by an underequipped Black fire company with help from faculty and students. Within a week of the fire, however, instruction resumed in a converted women's dormitory.

In the 1883–1884 academic year, collegiate instruction, roughly equivalent to the first year of university, was introduced. Under Robert Bean Sutton, who succeeded Smedes in 1884, the first diplomas were granted in 1885, and the Lyman Building, the school's first brick main building, was completed the same year. Aaron Burtis Hunter, who became the school's fourth principal in 1891, introduced industrial training, which all students received until 1933. The institution became Saint Augustine's School in 1893, with the school chapel built in 1895 and a new library in 1896. On October 18, 1896, the St. Agnes' Hospital and Training School for Nurses opened, becoming one of the primary Black healthcare facilities between Richmond and Atlanta. The following year, the school acquired 64 acres of land and expanded its campus to 110 acres. Electric lighting began to be installed from December 1906.

=== From school to university ===
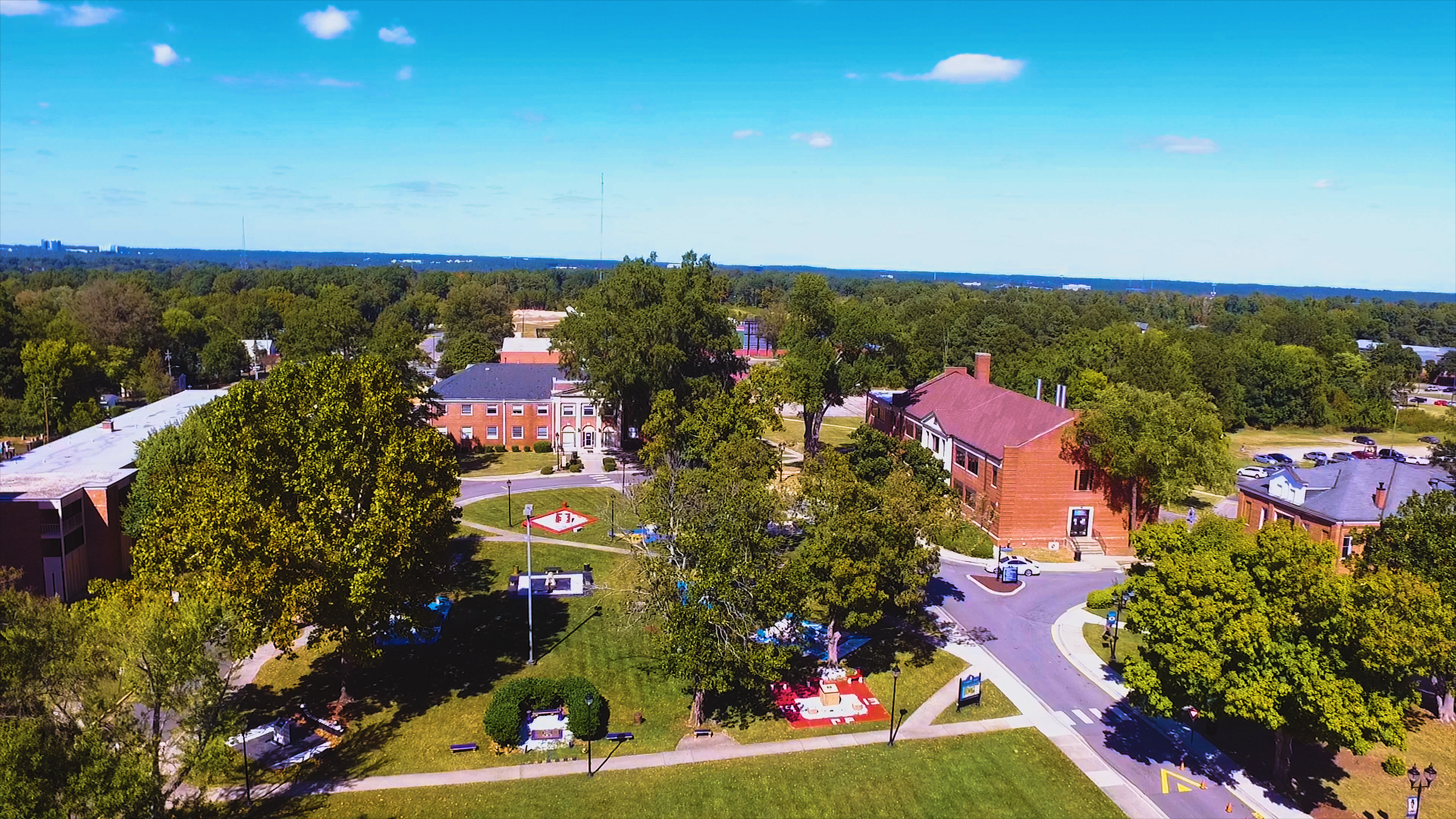
An aerial view of Saint Augustine's University's campus in 2018

In 1916, Edgar Hunt Goold became the institution's fifth principal and introduced courses for college credit in the 1917–18 academic year. The number of college-level courses increased over the next two years, and the school began formally offering a junior college program in 1921. (Note: Although the institution began the junior college program in 1921, Saint Augustine's apparently did not officially make the change until the 1924–1925 academic year.) A new administration building, the Hunter Building, was built in 1924, replacing the Lyman Building. In 1925, the first junior college class graduated, and the school began to fully prioritize college-level instruction from the fall of 1926, with Goold becoming the institution's first president. The institution was incorporated as the four-year Saint Augustine's College on January 19, 1928, with the first 12 baccalaureate degrees awarded in 1931 and accreditation from the Southern Association of Colleges and Schools (SACS) following in 1942. In June 1942, St. Agnes Hospital, which until then had been managed by the college, was incorporated as an independent institution under a separate board of managers.

In 1947, Harold Leonard Trigg became the first Black president of Saint Augustine's. Also the first lay president of the institution, Trigg oversaw an expansion of the curriculum and the college facilities, including completion of a science building. In 1949, the college joined the United Negro College Fund. Trigg was succeeded in 1955 by James Alexander Boyer, the first alumnus to head the institution. Under Boyer, enrollment doubled, several new buildings were built, and the curriculum further shifted from that of a normal college to a primarily liberal arts focus, although new graduates predominantly entered teaching as late as 1965. The former college main building, the Lyman Building, which had later been converted to a men's dormitory, was demolished in the summer of 1959 due to structural issues.

In 1967, Boyer relinquished the presidency and returned to teaching. He was succeeded by Prezell Russell Robinson as the eighth leader of the school and the second alumnus to head it. By 1974, St. Augustine's administration had declared its mission to prioritize recruitment of students from "deprived economic and educational backgrounds" to ensure their becoming "well-positioned citizens." 75 percent of its student body then consisted of first-generation college students. During Robinson's administration, enrollment reached 1,800 students, an ROTC program was instituted in the 1974–1975 academic year, and a new library, student union, and fine arts center were built. In 1982, Saint Augustine's created a Department of Communications and began operating a radio station, WAUG 750-AM, in 1983, followed by a television station, TV-68 (later WAUG-LD), in 1988. The Division of Allied Health was established in 1992. Robinson retired in March 1995.

Bernard Wayne Franklin, who succeeded Robinson, led a successful effort to modernize the college's infrastructure and provide it with universal Internet access. Following strong criticism over his management style, Franklin resigned in 1999 to accept the presidency of Virginia Union University. He was followed by Dianne Boardley Suber as the 10th and the first female leader of the college. Under Suber, the football program was revived in 2002 and a new running track and stadium were built in 2011. In 2012, the college officially became Saint Augustine's University as it prepared to offer master's degrees.

=== Instability and accreditation concerns ===
From the 1990s, Saint Augustine's began experiencing increasingly serious financial problems. During the decade, enrollment declined by 29 percent, the most of any North Carolina college. Enrollment had peaked at over 1,918 students in 1992, and subsequently declined, which was partly attributed to higher admissions standards implemented under president Franklin. By the fall of 1998, decreased enrollments led to Saint Augustine's resorting to fundraising to cover operating expenses. Since then, the institution has been severely challenged by persistent financial and administrative instability and other controversies.

In December 2001, the college's accrediting agency, the Southern Association of Colleges and Schools Commission on Colleges (SACSCOC), placed Saint Augustine's on warning. In addition to insufficient financial resources, the college was cited for inadequate library, planning, and educational support services; failing to evaluate academic effectiveness; and having faculty without appropriate credentials. Though the institution managed to correct the issues and have the warning lifted the following December, continued financial problems resulted in Saint Augustine's being placed on probation in late 2003. The college subsequently eliminated its deficit, and was removed from probation in December 2004. In September 2013, a financial audit uncovered disorganized accounting and checks being improperly issued. Due to these and other instances of mismanagement, coupled with decreasing enrollment, President Dianne Suber was dismissed in April 2014, a month before her planned retirement.

Following President Suber's dismissal, Everett Ward was appointed president in 2015 after serving as interim president. In December 2016, the institution was reverted to probationary accreditation for financial and institutional effectiveness issues. After reforms, including implementing computer-based accounting, the probation was lifted in December 2018. In March 2019, Saint Augustine's board of trustees dismissed Ward four months prior to his intended retirement. Gaddis Faulcon, the institution's former vice president of enrollment management, was appointed to replace Ward as interim president. In March 2020, Faulcon was himself dismissed. In October 2020, the new president of Saint Augustine's, Irving Pressly McPhail, died from COVID-19 after three months in office. He was succeeded by his widow, Christine Johnson McPhail, in February 2021. In December 2022, the institution was placed on probation "for good cause" for a third time by its accreditation agency. In November 2023, the trustees voted to dismiss Christine McPhail, who was formally dismissed on December 4. Marcus Burgess, vice president of institutional advancement at Claflin University, was then appointed interim president.

=== Accreditation revocations, subsequent appeals, and continued decline ===
On December 3, 2023, the SACSCOC rescinded Saint Augustine's membership for continued governance and financial management issues. The institution's Faculty Assembly issued a unanimous no-confidence motion against the board of trustees and the administration. In January 2024, only five days before the spring semester began, students were notified that on-campus classes would begin online due to maintenance issues, resulting in complaints about the short notice. On February 27, 2024, the SACSCOC denied Saint Augustine's appeal; the institution then submitted the matter to arbitration. From April, it transitioned to online learning, and Wake County Schools announced it would discontinue leadership academy classes at Saint Augustine's after 2024, eventually announcing its students would instead attend the neighboring Shaw University, another HBCU.

On July 21, an arbitration panel unanimously reversed the SACSCOC decision, continuing the institution's status as an accredited institution on probation for good cause. The panel ruled the institution should have been permitted to submit updated financial information. After a delayed opening on September 3, Saint Augustine's began the 2024–2025 academic year with just 200 students enrolled. On November 22, in an attempt to stem financial losses, it announced the dismissal of half of its employees, totaling 67 staff and 69 faculty members; several programs with low enrollment were also discontinued. The institution returned to fully remote instruction from November 27.

On December 8, 2024, the SACSCOC again voted to remove Saint Augustine's from membership, finding it remained noncompliant with seven core requirements and standards; it had also reached the end of its maximum allowable probation period. On December 10, the institution declared it would appeal. The same day, having previously suspended the Saint Augustine's Falcons from their conference for 2024–2025, the CIAA indefinitely suspended all Saint Augustine's athletics from conference participation until the institution was able to support an athletics program "in accordance with NCAA and CIAA bylaws." On January 7, 2025, interim president Burgess was cited for allegedly failing to secure Saint Augustine's workers' compensation insurance. The institution filed an appeal of the SACSCOC decision on January 24. On February 3, Burgess said Saint Augustine's would indefinitely continue fully remote instruction to address deferred maintenance. On March 5, a SACSCOC appeals committee upheld revoking Saint Augustine's accreditation. The institution then requested another arbitration process, during which it retained accreditation on a probationary basis.

=== Removal from athletics conference and derecognition ===
During its annual spring meeting from June 11–12, 2025, the CIAA removed Saint Augustine's from membership for continued noncompliance with athletic conference requirements. On July 14, a SACSCOC arbitration panel unanimously voted to remove Saint Augustine's from membership, stripping the institution of accredited status with immediate effect. By then, enrollment had collapsed to approximately 53 students, and the fiscal and governance crises had led to much of the institution's campus falling into disrepair. A June 28 fire in Latham Hall, a vacant dormitory, was being investigated as arson, while thieves had made attempts to steal air conditioning components. In August, Saint Augustine's secured a preliminary injunction against the SACSCOC, permitting its continued operation as an accredited institution until the conclusion of litigation. On August 31, interim president Burgess resigned, citing personal reasons. He was followed by further interim leaders. Fully online classes were held into early 2026.

=== Bankruptcy and suspension of operations ===
Due to its dire financial straits, Saint Augustine's filed for Chapter 11 bankruptcy on April 27, 2026, and halted efforts to retain accreditation, reverting to unaccredited status after May 15; students not graduating that spring were to be supported through teach-out agreements. The institution's administration said "non-degree certificates and apprenticeship programs" for working professionals would be developed while "a pathway toward reaccreditation" was built. Only about five students remained to transfer out at the end of the academic year. One student graduated that spring, following three students who had received diplomas in December 2025.

In May, the institution's lawyer and its bankruptcy administrator expressed concerns over continued vandalism on the unsecured and depopulated campus, following multiple break-ins at vacant dormitories and vandals throwing furniture out of windows. Its extreme financial distress was preventing the institution from properly securing its campus or being able to deploy more than two security guards. Only 25 employees remained, including "approximately" five faculty and fewer than five administrative staff, less than five of whom were then working on the campus. Saint Augustine's was later granted emergency loans to meet its payroll and secure its campus, including boarding up buildings and increasing security patrols. In August, the board recruited former MIT chancellor Phillip Clay to advise it on recovery strategies. After bankruptcy judge David Warren concluded the university was incapable of making further promises to potential students at that time, Saint Augustine's officially suspended all educational activities that month, with Warren deeming the university "essentially closed." The university also began planning the potential sale of portions of land.

On Nov. 10, 2026, the bankruptcy judge approved the appointment of Malcomb Coley as "chief restructuring officer." Coley, an accountant, served on the board of Queen's University in Charlotte for eight years, as it was facing financial issues.

== Challenges and controversies ==
In October 1991, Allan Cooper, a white political science professor, filed discrimination charges against Saint Augustine's with the Equal Employment Opportunity Commission (EEOC), alleging racially motivated discrimination and retaliation during his tenure application, which had been denied. Receiving further retaliation after filing charges, Cooper sued the college, president Prezell Robinson, and vice president Dwight Fennell; an April 1993 federal court ruling awarded him over $560,000 in damages. Subsequently, Leslie Ross, a former student of Cooper's who had been subpoenaed to testify on her professor's behalf, along with Thomas Shepherd, Cooper's former colleague who had supported him, separately charged the college, Robinson, and Fennell with retaliation. Ross, who never graduated due to emotional distress from the retaliatory actions against her, was awarded $180,000 in damages in January 1997.

In April 2006, the institution settled a workplace sexual harassment lawsuit after a former campus police dispatcher filed suit with the EEOC for alleged sexual assault by the college's former police chief. Along with a financial penalty, Saint Augustine's was required to enact a sexual harassment policy and provide annual training for employees. In April 2011, the institution barred a student, Roman Caple, from commencement exercises for an allegedly negative comment he had made on the college's Facebook page concerning management of tornado damage. Caple sued the college and President Dianne Suber, alleging she and other administrators had violated his rights of free expression by retaliating against him for his remarks. After Caple filed his suit, the college reportedly continued its retaliation by barring him from homecoming celebrations that October. The case was settled out of court that December to Caple's satisfaction, and resulted in the Foundation for Individual Rights and Expression (FIRE) including Saint Augustine's in its 2012 list of the "12 Worst Colleges for Free Speech."

=== Governance controversies ===
In March 2019, the Saint Augustine's board of trustees, then headed by James E. C. Perry, dismissed president Everett Ward; criticizing the decision, general counsel George Francis resigned and notified the board that the dismissal potentially constituted a governance violation. Over the following year, most trustees either resigned or were removed. The new board, led by Perry and alumnus and trustee Brian Boulware, was criticized for lacking transparency and making decisions without adhering to bylaws and procedures. In December 2019, athletics director George Williams requested the board formally censure Boulware for "...the verbal abuse, threats, and physical intimidation that he shows employees." Subsequently, trustee John Larkins, representing alumni, resigned and led the alumni association in a no-confidence motion, which called for the board to be reconstituted. In response, the board revised bylaws to limit the association's power to select an alumni trustee and changed voting requirements to remove board members from a simple majority to a two-thirds majority. In response to criticism of the new board structure and a lawsuit by former trustees, Boulware characterized their actions as "irresponsible, unconscionable, and equivalent to a terrorist attack against SAU." He refused calls to resign, stating he would leave office on his terms.

In April 2020, vice president Debra Clark Jones filed an internal complaint concerning an unapproved $375,000 payment to the Hughes Company, a contractor that had worked on Boulware's cigar bar. Clark Jones alleged the firm had been paid to repair dormitories without a formal bidding process or signing a contract; she also reported Perry had suggested meeting minutes be altered to falsely indicate a contract had been approved, potentially further jeopardizing the institution's accreditation. In July 2020, together with George Williams and other former administrators who had been fired, former interim president Gaddis Faulcon filed a wrongful termination lawsuit. The suit cited interim president Maria Lumpkin and the chair of the board of trustees, Perry, alleging the institution's leadership had engaged in age discrimination, retaliation, and other unlawful conduct, including the potential misappropriation of government funding. The board strongly denied the allegations. Williams subsequently settled his suit but did not receive any apologies from the administration.

In October 2023, head football coach Howard Feggins was fired for allegedly fielding ineligible players. Feggins then filed a wrongful termination lawsuit alleging retaliation, intimidation, and neglect of student athletes. In November, the trustees fired president Christine McPhail, which she alleged was in retaliation for filing race- and gender-based discrimination charges against the institution with the Equal Employment Opportunity Commission (EEOC); the board said McPhail's accusations were unfounded allegations. Facing mounting public criticism, Boulware issued a detailed statement in April 2025 denying that either he or the serving trustees were responsible for Saint Augustine's dire situation; he attributed the multiple crises to "administrative negligence" by successive administrations over the preceding decade, that had deliberately concealed information and "willingly" misled the trustees. In January 2026, both Boulware and Perry left the board, reportedly partly due to conditions imposed by the institution's financial lender.

=== Financial crisis ===
In October 2023, an auditing committee which included the vice president of SACS scrutinized Saint Augustine's finances and governance procedures. The committee found no evidence trustees were "managing the financials of the institution or any strategies for timely audits," and that budgets since 2019 had been approved "without externally audited or verified evidence of resources or operational results." The auditors recommended board members receive "extensive training" regarding fiduciary oversight practices, noting the board failed to understand "its role in the management process," nor did it understand or appreciate "the severity of current fiscal issues."

In February 2024, the institution failed to pay employees, and students said some faculty canceled classes because they weren't being paid. By then, the Department of Education had placed the institution on Heightened Cash Monitoring. Later, interim President Burgess told staff that the institution would have to delay paychecks due on March 8. Multiple organizations accused the institution of having unpaid bills amounting to millions; the N.C. state government claimed Saint Augustine's had nearly $27,000 of unpaid unemployment taxes. An audit revealed policies regulating wire transfers were often disregarded. According to interim president Marcus Burgess, the institution accounted for $10 million by contacting vendors and creditors. On April 3, Burgess said the institution required "$30 million for good judgement," to pay creditors.

On August 16, 2024, Saint Augustine's secured a $7 million line of credit with Gothic Ventures, a Durham-based venture capital firm, against a lien on all university properties, with the main campus and 40 other properties as collateral. The funds would cover operating expenses, including back wages, and the costs of financial audits. The initial loan, scheduled to come due in 2025, came with an interest rate of 24 percent, an additional 2 percent "management fee," and a $75,000 "due diligence and documentation fee," and was strongly criticized by alumni and advocates for the institution, who characterized the terms as unsustainable and predatory. The lender, however, defended the high interest rate as due to the "...financial challenges facing the University...and the suspension of the University’s accreditation." In September, two vendors who had filed suit against Saint Augustine's to settle unpaid bills had cases ruled in their favor, allowing both to pursue recovery of their fees, potentially through property liens.

In early November 2024, the institution completed two overdue audits for the 2022 and 2023 fiscal years; both revealed inaccurate accounting, lack of oversight concerning financial reporting and major transactions, inappropriate procurement and approval procedures for "certain significant contracts," and that as of November 8, unpaid payroll withholdings and taxes totaled "approximately $8.4 million, excluding interest and penalties." In the 2023–24 fiscal year, the institution recorded a deficit of $6.4 million, in addition to a $9.1 million deficit the previous fiscal year. The audits revealed that net tuition and fee revenues had declined to $7.9 million between 2022 and 2024, while operating expenses in 2024 totaled $27.3 million. On November 14, Judge Becky Holt dismissed a lawsuit filed by "Save SAU," a coalition of university alumni and supporters suing to remove the board of trustees for alleged financial mismanagement; the judge ruled the coalition lacked standing to sue a nonprofit institution. "Save SAU" had alleged Brian Boulware, as board chairman, had benefited from loan brokerage fees and had permitted large wire transfers without documentation; a forensic audit found no evidence of such fees or that Boulware had received any unethical payments.

In July 2025, interim president Burgess disclosed Saint Augustine's had accumulated debts of over $47 million. The institution was indebted to over 30 separate creditors, including its primary lender, Gothic Ventures, the IRS, the North Carolina Department of Revenue, the North Carolina Department of Commerce, and multiple banks, law firms, and contractors. In January 2026, the institution began working with an advisory firm, Self-Help Venture Fund, to manage its debt burden. Self-Help purchased the Gothic Ventures loan, reducing its interest rate to 9 percent; additionally, it assisted Saint Augustine's with hiring an attorney and a crisis management PR firm along with providing financial guidance to the board of trustees. In April 2026, accumulated debts reportedly included "debts of $14.4 million to the Internal Revenue Service, more than $7 million to other federal agencies, including the Department of Education, and $1.6 million to the North Carolina Department of Revenue." Saint Augustine's was also unable to pay its public utility and energy bills. On April 27, it filed for Chapter 11 bankruptcy to allow it to reorganize its debt and continue efforts to remain operational.

In an initial bankruptcy hearing, the institution disclosed it was building an inventory of its assets and had yet to file tax returns for the past two fiscal years, for which it was trying to hire an accounting firm, but was unable to continue any operations without further borrowing; the bankruptcy judge approved an initial $200,000 loan from Self-Help. Although Saint Augustine's was receiving $10,000 each month from rental properties in Raleigh and Rome, Georgia, those revenues were not then being utilized. At a May 27 hearing, it further disclosed its debts totaled approximately $74 million owed to over 300 creditors, against only $426,000 in cash assets and its campus properties, valued at $200 million; however, an accountant and auditor were planned to be hired so an accurate report could be made of the financial situation. Its lawyer, Ciara Rogers, testified the institution intended to reimburse those creditors owed cash payments. A representative for the federal district attorney considered it likely Saint Augustine's had misused federal grant funds in attempting to sustain operations.

Attempting to offset continued expenses such as salaries and building upkeep, the university developed eight fully online certificate programs for students with bachelor's degrees, though its bankruptcy case administrator and the judge overseeing the case declined to approve them, with judge David Warren expressing doubts about whether "this was the right direction for the school." He further observed the institution's debts were continuing to increase by $300,000 each month. With the high value of the campus, the sale of some portions of it was also under discussion. The university subsequently suspended further educational activities to focus on repaying creditors, including its former students.

== Leaders ==
Before 1926, the leader of the institution held the title of "Principal". Since then, the leader has been a "President".

(* indicates alumnus)
| Name | Tenure |
|---|---|
| Jacob Brinton Smith | July 1867 – October 1872 |
| John Esten Cooke Smedes | October 1872 – 1884 |
| Robert Bean Sutton | 1884 – 1891 |
| Aaron Burtis Hunter | 1891 – June 1916 |
| Edgar Hunt Goold | June 1916 – September 1947 |
| Harold Leonard Trigg | September 1947 – January 1955 |
| James Alexander Boyer* | January 1955 – February 1967 |
| Prezell Russell Robinson* | February 1967 – March 1995 |
| Bernard Wayne Franklin | March 1995 – May 1999 |
| A. Melvin Miller* (interim) | June – November 1999 |
| Dianne Boardley Suber | December 1999 – April 2014 |
| Everett Ward* | April 2014 – March 2019 |
| Gaddis Faulcon* (interim) | March 2019 – March 2020 |
| Maria A. Lumpkin (interim) | March 2020 – July 2020 |
| Irving Pressley McPhail | July 2020 – October 2020 |
| Maria A. Lumpkin (interim) | October 2020 – February 2021 |
| Christine Johnson McPhail | February 2021 – December 2023 |
| Marcus H. Burgess (interim) | December 2023 – August 2025 |
| Verjanis A. Peoples (interim) | August 2025 – December 2025 |
| Jennie Ward-Robinson (interim) | December 2025 – April 2026 |
| Verjanis A. Peoples (interim) | April 2026 – present |

== Campus ==
- Saint Augustine's College Campus
- U.S. National Register of Historic Places
- U.S. Historic district
- Location within North Carolina Location within the United States
- Location: Oakwood Ave., Raleigh, North Carolina
- Area: 20 acres (0.081 km^{2})
- Architectural style: Late Gothic Revival, Romanesque
- NRHP reference No.: 80002903
- Added to NRHP: March 28, 1980

The main campus consists of approximately 95 acres (0.38 km^{2}) across seven parcels, of which the primary parcel, an 80.78 acres (0.3269 km^{2}) tract, hosts the academic buildings, residence halls, and athletic complex, as listed below:

=== St. Agnes Hospital ===
The private St. Agnes hospital was established in 1896 with guidance from Mrs. Sarah Hunter, the wife of St. Augustine's principal Aaron Burtis Hunter. In 1909, it moved into a dedicated stone structure. St. Agnes was managed by the college until 1942, when it was incorporated as an independent hospital. One of its most famous patients was boxer Jack Johnson, who was taken there following a fatal 1946 accident. The hospital closed in 1961, after which the building housed offices until the early 1990s, when it was gutted as part of planned renovations; these were halted in 2001 due to escalating costs stemming from unanticipated environmental and structural issues. The standing outer shell of the structure is regarded as a historic property.

=== Chapel ===
The chapel is the oldest surviving structure on the campus. Built by students in 1895 from stone quarried on the campus, it was consecrated on October 11, 1897. It was designed by Henry Beard Delany, who later became the first African-American suffragan bishop elected to the Episcopal Church from North Carolina and the first Episcopal bishop to graduate from the college. The original chapel was a rectangular structure with a tower; in 1904, a north transept was added, with the tower replaced by a transept in 1917.

=== Administration and classroom buildings ===
- Benson Building of Technology (1930)
- Charles H. Boyer Administration Building (1970; Office of the President)
- Cheshire Building (1930; Division of Business)
- Delany Hall (1930; Office of Financial Aid & Admissions)
- Julia Chester Emery Gymnasium
- Goold Hall Student Union (1930)
- Gordon Health Center
- Hermitage Faculty Building (1914)
- Hunter Administration Building (1924)
- Seby B. Jones Fine Arts Center
- Martin Luther King Jr. Student Center (1968)
- Charles Mosee Building (1919; Office of Academic Affairs)
- Penick Hall of Math & Sciences (1950)
- Prezell R. Robinson Library (1972)
- Tuttle Hall of Military Sciences (1925)
- George "Pup" Williams Athletic Complex

=== Residence halls ===
Saint Augustine's has the following student residence halls:

| Residence hall | Opened | Note |
|---|---|---|
| Baker Hall | 1966 | |
| Boyer Hall | 1990 | All-female; for upperclassmen women. |
| Falkcrest Apartments | 2007 | Co-educational; for rising sophomores, upperclassmen, and presidential scholars. |
| Latham Hall | 1971 | All-male; for freshmen and upperclassmen. |
| Weston Hall | 1986 | All-female; for freshmen and upperclassmen women. |
| Lynch Hall | 1966 | |
| Atkinson Hall | 1956 | |

== Student activities ==
Until the 2025–26 academic year, Saint Augustine's had a variety of student organizations and local chapters of five fraternities and three sororities.

=== Athletics ===
Until 2024, Saint Augustine's competed in the NCAA Division II in the Central Intercollegiate Athletic Association. In December 2024, the CIAA indefinitely suspended Saint Augustine's from conference participation for noncompliance with NCAA and CIAA requirements and revoked its membership in June 2025.

In their final year prior to being suspended, varsity men's sports included football, golf, basketball, cross-country, and outdoor and indoor track. Varsity women's sports then included softball, volleyball, basketball, cross-country, and outdoor and indoor track.

=== Notable alumni ===
| Name | Class year | Notability | Reference(s) |
|---|---|---|---|
| Bernard Allen | 1962 | Educator and long-time lobbyist for the North Carolina Association of Educators; North Carolina House member, 2003–2006 | |
| Hannah Diggs Atkins | 1943 | First African-American woman elected to the Oklahoma House of Representatives (1968–1980) | |
| Luther Barnes | 1979 | Gospel music recording artist | |
| Ralph Campbell, Jr. | 1968 | Former North Carolina State Auditor; the first African-American elected to that position in North Carolina | |
| Travis Cherry | (Note: Enrolled from 1994 to 1996.) | Grammy nominated music producer | |
| Anna Julia Cooper | 1877 (Note: Graduated from the high school.) | Writer, educator, one of the first African-American women to receive a PhD. | |
| Bessie and Sadie Delany | | Educators and authors who published their best-selling memoir, Having Our Say, at the ages of 102 and 104, respectively | |
| Henry Beard Delany | 1885 | First African-American Episcopal Bishop elected in North Carolina and the second nationally. | |
| Hubert Thomas Delany | 1919 | Civil rights pioneer, lawyer, politician, assistant U.S. attorney, and the first African American Tax Commissioner of New York and one of the first appointed African American judges in New York City. | |
| Ruby Butler DeMesme | 1969 | Former Assistant Secretary of the Air Force for Manpower, Installations and Environment | |
| Ramon Gittens | | Sprinter at the 2012 Summer Olympics | |
| Maycie Herrington | 1940 | Documentarian of the Tuskegee Airmen and social worker | |
| Bershawn "Batman" Jackson | 2010 | Track and field athlete; 2008 Summer Olympics bronze medalist (Men's 400 metres hurdles) | |
| Ike Lassiter | 1962 | NFL player | |
| William McBryar | (Note: Enrolled from 1883 to 1886, when he dropped out prior to his army enlistment.) | Medal of Honor recipient | |
| James E.C. Perry | 1966 | Justice of the Supreme Court of Florida | |
| Antonio Pettigrew | | Gold medalist at the 1991 World Championships in Tokyo. | |
| Cynthia A. Pratt | 1983 | 12th Governor-General of the Bahamas | |
| Lloyd Quarterman | | Chemist who worked on the Manhattan Project. | |

== Relevant literature ==
- Suttell, Brian. 2023. Campus to Counter: Civil Rights in Raleigh and Durham, North Carolina, 1960–1963. Macon, Georgia: Mercer University Press.
