= North Orange County Community College District =

Community college district in Orange County, California, United States

Location
- Orange County, California

District information
- Type: Community College District
- Established: 1 July 1965 (61 years ago)
- Chancellor: Byron D. Clift Breland
- Accreditations: Accrediting Commission for Community and Junior Colleges; Western Association of Schools and Colleges
- Schools: 3

Students and staff
- Students: 90,000
- Faculty: 593 (full-time); 1,469 (part-time)
- Staff: 732

Other information
- Website: www.nocccd.edu

The North Orange County Community College District (NOCCCD) is a community college district in Orange County, California that offers associate degrees and adult education certificates. It includes two colleges: Cypress College and Fullerton College.

== Campuses ==
The District currently has three main campuses:

=== Cypress College ===
Located in Cypress, California, Cypress College offers over degrees in 73 areas of study, 56 university-transfer majors and 176 career-certificate programs. In the 2015–16 academic year, Cypress College, was home to over 16,000 students.

=== Fullerton College ===
Located in Fullerton, California, Fullerton College offers over 90 associate degree programs and over 140 vocational certificate programs, as well as 25 associate degrees for transfer. In the 2016–17 academic year, Fullerton College, was home to over 34,000 students.

=== North Orange Continuing Education (NOCE) ===
Located in northern Orange County, California, the North Orange Continuing Education provides non-credit continuing adult education and community service classes at all three of its campus locations, as well as numerous off-campus locations. NOCE has locations in Anaheim, California, Cypress, California and Fullerton, California. Some of the classes NOCE offers include: GED/HiSET preparation, ESL, Educational Enrichment for Older Adults and even a variety of career certificates.

== Board of trustees ==
The main governing body of the NOCCCD is the board of trustees. This body is composed of seven members, including three student trustees representing Cypress College, Fullerton College and North Orange Continuing Education (NOCE), and is charged with establishing all policies that guide the general operation of the District.

== NOCCCD Foundation ==
Formed in 1987, the Community College Foundation of North Orange County (CCFONOC), or informally the NOCCCD Foundation, is a charitable organization whose goal is to assist in the achievement and maintenance of superior educational and community programs of the NOCCCD. The Foundation world to achieve this goal by receiving contributions from the public, raising funds, and making contributions to educational, community, and legislative programs.

Furthermore, the Foundation currently administers the endowments of two scholarship programs for students at Cypress College and Fullerton College: the Nilane Lee Memorial Scholarship and the Walt Pray Memorial Scholarship.
