= Cypress College =

Public community college in Cypress, California, US

- Former name: Cypress Junior College
- Motto: Buen Cypress! We Take This Journey Together.
- Type: Public community college
- Established: 1966 (60 years ago)
- Parent institution: North Orange County Community College District
- Budget: $75 million
- President: Scott Thayer
- Academic staff: 215 (full-time); 400 (part-time)
- Administrative staff: 285
- Students: 16,214 (2016–17)
- Location: Cypress, California, United States; 33°49′42″N 118°01′28″W
- Campus: 110 acres (44.5 ha); Urban
- Colors: Blue and Gold
- Nickname: Chargers
- Sporting affiliations: Orange Empire Conference; California Community College Athletic Association
- Mascot: Charlie the Charger
- Website: Official Website

Cypress College is a public community college in Cypress, California. It is part of the California Community Colleges System and belongs to the North Orange County Community College District. It offers a variety of general education (55 associate degrees), transfer courses (58 transfer majors), and 145 vocational programs leading to associate degrees and certificates.

== History ==
The college opened on September 12, 1966, as Cypress Junior College.

== Campus ==
The campus, covering an area of 44 hectares (110 acres), was designed by architect Frank Lawyer of the Houston, Texas-based firm Caudill Rowlett Scott. It features several futuristic-looking buildings set around a central lake. The college is noteworthy in that it has never completely abandoned the style of buildings it was initially created with. The new library, which opened on January 30, 2006, still bears heavy resemblance to the school's original buildings, though the use of concrete is de-emphasized in favor of glass.

== Organization and administration ==
Cypress College operates with a decentralized approach of separate academic "divisions," allowing the benefits of both a small and large college campus. Each of the campus' instructional buildings was designed with a commons area where students with similar majors could meet and study.

The college is a part of the North Orange County Community College District. The campus is also part of the California Community College System.

=== Campus presidents ===
- Dan Walker, 1967–1970
- Omar Scheidt, 1970–1977
- Don Bedard, 1977–1978 ¹
- Jack Scott, 1978–1987
- Elma Clamp, 1987–1988 ¹
- Kirk Avery, 1988–1992
- Tom Harris, Jr., 1992–1994 ¹
- Christine Johnson, 1995–1998
- Don Bedard, 1998–1999 ¹
- Margie Lewis, 1999–2007
- Michael J. Kasler, 2007–2012
- Bob Simpson, 2012–2017
- JoAnna Schilling, 2017–2023
- Scott Thayer, 2023-Present

¹ Served in an interim capacity.

=== College leadership ===
In addition to the college president, who serves as the campus CEO, Cypress College's presidential leadership team includes three Vice Presidents, an executive director, two directors, and an executive assistant. The college has 10 instructional dean positions and one dean for student services.

== Academic Pathways ==
Cypress College organizes its academic programs into nine pathways following the California Guided Pathways model of meta majors. These pathways also reflect the college's organizational structure of its academic divisions. The college's pathways are:

- Business & Computer Information Systems
- Career Technical Education
- Health Science
- Kinesiology
- Language Arts
- Science, Engineering & Math
- Social Sciences
- Visual and Performing Arts (name changed January 7, 2023, from Fine Arts)
- Exploration/Undecided

Each of these pathways are highlighted during commencement and a Presidential Scholar of Distinction is selected each year to represent each pathway.

== Academics ==
Cypress College's student population reaches nearly 17,000 per semester, though that number has fluctuated (experiencing historically high levels in 2010 and going as low as 12,500) in recent years based on the level of state funding provided and other economic factors. Spring 2012 enrollment was approximately 15,000.

The college features a strong mix of ethnic diversity in its student population: 33% are Caucasian, 27% are Latino, 19% are Asian/Pacific Islander, 8% are Filipino, 6% are African American, and 5% are from other ethnicities or their ethnicity is unidentified.

The college is a Training Center for the National Alternative Fuels Training Consortium. Cypress College Registered Nursing program graduates scored a 97.26% pass-rate in the 2004/2005 test years, 95.38% pass-rate for 2005/2006 test years, and 98.91% pass rate in the 2006/2007 test years on the State of California Board of Registered Nursing NCLEX state licensure examination. Approximately 24% of students fail the RN program.

Cypress College is home to the only mortuary science program in the greater Orange County and Greater Los Angeles areas, and is one of only two such public programs in the state of California.

== Library ==
The Cypress College Library has a collection of approximately 70,000 books, 5,000 periodicals (mainly online), a large collection of reference works, and a variety of DVDs. The library offers students free 24/7 access to electronic databases with full text magazine, newspaper, journal, and encyclopedia articles. The library's special collections/archives houses materials that hold value to the college. These collections are not open to the public.

== Student life ==
Student demographics as of Fall 2023
| Race and ethnicity | Total |
|---|---|
| Hispanic | 53% |
| Asian | 23% |
| White | 11% |
| Multiracial | 6% |
| African American | 4% |
| Unknown | 1% |

=== Athletics ===
Cypress College has 13 intercollegiate teams, including men's and women's teams. The athletics teams are nicknamed the Chargers. For men the school offers baseball, basketball, golf, soccer, swim & dive, and tennis. Women are offered basketball, soccer, softball, swim & dive, tennis, volleyball, and water polo. These programs have attained 73 conference titles and 24 state championships. The college's notable alumni list is heavily influenced by the 20 Major League Baseball players and 137 MLB draft picks. These include Hall of Fame member Trevor Hoffman. The athletics alumni also include NBA All-Star selections Swen Nater and Mark Eaton, who both played for Cypress' first basketball coach, Don Johnson. In 2009, the school renamed its basketball court "Don Johnson Court" in his honor.

Cypress College has won state championships in nine team sports and is also represented by individuals in additional sports such as golf, dive, and tennis. The softball team has earned 10 California championships, followed by baseball with five. These two teams were coached by brothers Brad (softball) and Scott (baseball) Pickler, who combined won 27 Orange Empire Conference Championships and 13 California state championships.

=== Arts ===
Cypress College hosts student performances, exhibitions and events throughout the year. Theater, dance and music studies culminate in student performances held in the Cypress College theaters and recital hall. The Cypress College Art Gallery and the Edouard de Merlier Photography Gallery host annual student exhibitions at the end of every Spring semester, showcasing student work from the Art, Media Arts Design and Photography departments. The college also holds its Annual Film Festival every Spring semester which premieres short films made by Media Arts Design students.

== Notable alumni ==
- Tank Abbott – mixed martial arts fighter, professional wrestler, and author
- Scott Aukerman – comedian
- Jason Bates – professional baseball player
- Greg Cannom – movie makeup artist
- Caitlin Doughty – mortician, author, and promoter of death acceptance and alternative funeral practices
- Brian Downing – professional baseball player
- Mark Eaton – professional basketball player
- Ben Francisco – professional baseball player
- Keith Ginter – professional baseball player
- Charles Gipson – professional baseball player
- Carla Harvey – singer in the band Butcher Babies
- Vince Hizon – professional basketball player
- Trevor Hoffman – professional baseball pitcher
- Geri Jewell – actor and comedian
- Brandon Laird – professional baseball player
- Gerald Laird – professional baseball player
- Steven Lee – music producer
- Alon Leichman – Olympian and professional baseball coach
- Pat Martin – radio personality
- Keith McDonald – professional baseball player
- Swen Nater – professional basketball player
- David Newhan – professional baseball player (attended)
- Augie Ojeda – professional baseball player
- Jeff Patterson – professional baseball player
- John Sexton – photographer
- Steve Smyth – professional baseball player
- Gwen Stefani – musician
- Eric Stefani – musician and cartoonist
- Cory Sullivan – professional baseball player
- Kirsten Vangsness – actress
- Jason Vargas – professional baseball player
- George Zeber – professional baseball player
