= Batesville, South Carolina =

Settlement in South Carolina, United States

Coordinates: 34°51′02″N 82°13′50″W

Batesville is an unincorporated community in Greenville County, in the U.S. state of South Carolina.

== History ==
The community was named after William Bates, the original owner of the town site. A post office called Batesville was established in 1890, and remained in operation until 1907.

In 1925, Batesville had 150 inhabitants.
