= List of Phi Chi Theta chapters =

Phi Chi Theta is an American professional business fraternity. It was founded as a women's business fraternity on June 16, 1924, by the merger of Phi Theta Kappa and Phi Kappa Epsilon, both formed in 1918. While most chapters are now co-ed, there are some which have only women as members.

In the following Phi Chi Theta chapter list, active chapters are indicated in bold and inactive chapters and institutions are in italics.

Chapter	Charter date and range	Institution	Location	Status	Ref.
New York Alpha	June 16, 1924 – 1951	Columbia University	New York City, New York	Inactive	(Note: This was a founding chapter.)
Colorado Alpha	June 16, 1924 – 1962	University of Denver	Denver, Colorado	Inactive	
**New York Beta**	June 16, 1924	New York University	New York City, New York	Active	
Oregon Beta	June 16, 1924 – 1981	University of Oregon	Eugene, Oregon	Inactive	
Gamma	June 16, 1924 – 20xx ?	Oregon State University	Corvallis, Oregon	Inactive	
Delta	June 16, 1924 – 1972	Northwestern University	Evanston, Illinois	Inactive	
**Epsilon**	June 16, 1924	University of Pittsburgh	Pittsburgh, Pennsylvania	Active	
**Zeta**	June 16, 1924 – 19xx ?; March 9, 1963 – 19xx ?; 2014	Boston University	Boston, Massachusetts	Active	
Eta	1924–1984	University of California, Berkeley	Berkeley, California	Inactive	(Note: This chapter dates to 1924, but was not a founding chapter.)
Theta				Unassigned	
**Iota**	1925–19xx ?, 2026-	University of Wisconsin–Madison	Madison, Wisconsin	Active	
Kappa	1925–1956, 1958–1959	University of North Dakota	Grand Forks, North Dakota	Inactive	
Lambda	1925–1980	University of Kansas	Lawrence, Kansas	Inactive	
Mu	1925–1968	University of Utah	Salt Lake City, Utah	Inactive	
Nu (see **Zeta Eta)**	1925–19xx ?	Indiana University Bloomington	Bloomington, Indiana	Inactive	
Xi	1925–1985	University of Southern California	Los Angeles, California	Inactive	
**Omicron**	1926	University of Missouri	Columbia, Missouri	Active	
Pi	1926–1957	University of Idaho	Moscow, Idaho	Inactive	
Rho	1927–20xx ?	University of Nebraska–Lincoln	Lincoln, Nebraska	Inactive	
Sigma (see **Zeta Gamma**)	1927–1958	University of Illinois	Urbana, Illinois	Inactive	
Tau (see **Zeta Nu**)	1928–1985	Ohio State University	Columbus, Ohio	Inactive	
**Upsilon**	April 15, 1929	Georgia State University	Atlanta, Georgia	Active	
Phi	January 1936–1938	University of Colorado	Boulder, Colorado	Inactive	
Chi	November 21, 1937 – 1983	University of Alabama	Tuscaloosa, Alabama	Inactive	
Psi	March 1938–1965	Brigham Young University	Provo, Utah	Inactive	
Omega	June 16, 1938	University of California, Los Angeles		Reassigned	(Note: This chapter was originally named Omega but soon renamed as Alpha Alpha as preferred by the members.)
Alpha Alpha	June 16, 1938 – 1970	University of California, Los Angeles	Los Angeles, California	Inactive	
Alpha Beta	April 30, 1939 – 1976	Marquette University	Milwaukee, Wisconsin	Inactive	
Alpha Gamma	May 15, 1944	Southern Methodist University	University Park, Texas	Active	
Alpha Delta	March 29, 1947 – 1976	Washington State University	Pullman, Washington	Inactive	
Alpha Epsilon	May 18, 1947 – 19xx ?; March 28, 1961 – 20xx ?	University of Georgia	Athens, Georgia	Inactive	
Alpha Zeta	January 31, 1948 – 1974	University of Montana	Missoula, Montana	Inactive	
Alpha Eta	1948–1980	Saint Louis University	St. Louis, Missouri	Inactive	
Alpha Theta				Unassigned	
**Alpha Iota**	April 14, 1955	Pennsylvania State University	University Park, Pennsylvania	Active	
Alpha Kappa	May 1, 1955 – 1967	Pepperdine University	Malibu, California	Inactive	
Alpha Lambda (see **Zeta Beta**)	June 5, 1955 – 1969	University of Michigan	Ann Arbor, Michigan	Inactive	
**Alpha Mu**	September 25, 1955 – 1986, 1989	University of Maryland, College Park	College Park, Maryland	Active	
Alpha Nu	May 11, 1956	University of North Texas	Denton, Texas	Inactive	
Alpha Xi	May 4, 1956 – 1962; 1965–1965	Tulane University	New Orleans, Louisiana	Inactive	
Alpha Omicron	May 12, 1956 – 1986	University of Florida	Gainesville, Florida	Inactive	
Alpha Pi	May 4, 1957 – 1984	Kansas State University	Manhattan, Kansas	Inactive	
Alpha Rho	May 25, 1957 – 1983	Florida State University	Tallahassee, Florida	Inactive	
Alpha Sigma	March 29, 1958 – 1963	Birmingham–Southern College	Birmingham, Alabama	Inactive	
**Alpha Tau**	May 10, 1958 – 19xx ?; March 25, 1961 – 20xx ?; February 12, 2025	University of Arizona	Tucson, Arizona	Active	
**Alpha Upsilon**	May 23, 1959	Bradley University	Peoria, Illinois	Active	
Alpha Phi	May 30, 1959 – 20xx ?	University of Nebraska Omaha	Omaha, Nebraska	Inactive	
Alpha Chi	March 19, 1960 – 1987	Samford University	Homewood, Alabama	Inactive	
Alpha Psi	April 10, 1960 – 1967	Morningside University	Sioux City, Iowa	Inactive	
**Alpha Omega**	May 7, 1960 – 1986; 2013	Rutgers University–New Brunswick	New Brunswick, New Jersey	Active	
Beta Alpha	March 28, 1961 – 1987	University of Southern Mississippi	Hattiesburg, Mississippi	Inactive	
Beta Beta	May 13, 1961 – 1986	University of Portland	Portland, Oregon	Inactive	
Beta Gamma	February 16, 1962 – 1975	Loyola University New Orleans	New Orleans, Louisiana	Inactive	
Beta Delta (see Epsilon Mu)	March 3, 1962 – 1985; 1987–20xx ?	St. John's University	New York City, New York	Inactive	
Beta Epsilon	March 25, 1962 – 1987	McNeese State University	Lake Charles, Louisiana	Inactive	
Beta Zeta	February 3, 1963 – 19xx ?	Texas Christian University	Fort Worth, Texas	Inactive	
Beta Eta	April 3, 1963 – 1988	Carson–Newman University	Jefferson City, Tennessee	Inactive	
**Beta Theta**	April 6, 1963	Sam Houston State University	Huntsville, Texas	Active	
Beta Iota	October 12, 1963 – 19xx ?	University of New Orleans	New Orleans, Louisiana	Inactive	(Note: Chapter formed at Louisiana State University in New Orleans, now the University of New Orleans)
Beta Kappa	February 15, 1964 – 19xx ?	California State University, Fresno	Fresno, California	Inactive	
Beta Lambda	May 17, 1964 – 1980	Texas A&M University–Commerce	Commerce, Texas	Inactive	
Beta Mu	May 24, 1964 – 1979	California State University, Los Angeles	Los Angeles, California	Inactive	
Beta Nu	October 25, 1964 – 19xx ?	Midwestern State University	Wichita Falls, Texas	Inactive	
Beta Xi	May 6, 1965 – 1984	University of Puget Sound	Tacoma, Washington	Inactive	
Beta Omicron	May 6, 1965 – 19xx ?	Rider University	Lawrence Township, New Jersey	Inactive	
Beta Pi	May 1, 1966 – 1984	Mississippi State University	Starkville, Mississippi	Inactive	
Beta Rho	May 1, 1966 – 19xx ?	Florida Southern College	Lakeland, Florida	Inactive	
Beta Sigma	May 5, 1966 – 1979	Pacific Lutheran University	Parkland, Washington	Inactive	
Beta Tau	May 19, 1966 – 1974	University of Wisconsin–Milwaukee	Milwaukee, Wisconsin	Inactive	
Beta Upsilon	May 22, 1966 – 1979	California State University, Northridge	Los Angeles, California	Inactive	
Beta Phi	May 23, 1966 – 1975	Seattle University	Seattle, Washington	Inactive	
**Beta Chi**	November 12, 1963	University of Tennessee at Martin	Martin, Tennessee	Active	
Beta Psi	June 4, 1967 – 1973	Loyola University Chicago	Chicago, Illinois	Inactive	
Beta Omega	May 20, 1967 – 1983	Eastern Washington University	Cheney, Washington	Inactive	
Gamma Alpha	November 18, 1967–19xx ?	University of Tennessee	Knoxville, Tennessee	Inactive	
Gamma Beta	February 24, 1968 – 1975	Western Kentucky University	Bowling Green, Kentucky	Inactive	
Gamma Gamma	May 17, 1968 – 1979	Arizona State University	Phoenix, Arizona	Inactive	
Gamma Delta	May 12, 1968 – 19xx ?	Stephen F. Austin State University	Nacogdoches, Texas	Inactive	
Gamma Epsilon	June 13, 1969 – 1976	California State University, Long Beach	Long Beach, California	Inactive	
Gamma Zeta	October 25, 1969 – 19xx ?	University of South Alabama	Mobile, Alabama	Inactive	
Gamma Eta	February 21, 1970 – 1982	Idaho State University	Pocatello, Idaho	Inactive	
Gamma Theta	May 10, 1970 – 19xx ?	Stetson University	DeLand, Florida	Inactive	
Gamma Iota	June 9, 1971	University of Colorado Denver	Denver, Colorado	Inactive	
Gamma Kappa	April 23, 1972 – 1984	Alabama A&M University	Normal, Alabama	Inactive	
Gamma Lambda	October 1972–1986	University of San Francisco	San Francisco	Inactive	
Gamma Mu (see **Zeta Rho**)	June 17, 1972 – 1980	University of South Florida	Tampa, Florida	Inactive	
Gamma Nu	April 28, 1973 – 1986	California State Polytechnic University, Pomona	Pomona, California	Inactive	
Gamma Xi	1973–19xx?, 1992–20xx ?	Pace University	New York City, New York	Inactive	
Gamma Omicron	August 4, 1973 – 1981	University of Central Florida	Orange County, Florida	Inactive	
Gamma Pi	August 19, 1973 – 1979	Southern Illinois University Edwardsville	Edwardsville, Illinois	Inactive	
Gamma Rho	August 25, 1973 – 1978	Washburn University	Topeka, Kansas	Inactive	
Gamma Sigma	September 9, 1973 – 1976	St. Ambrose University	Davenport, Iowa	Inactive	
**Gamma Tau**	September 29, 1973	University of Montevallo	Montevallo, Alabama	Active	
Gamma Upsilon	October 6, 1973	Duquesne University	Pittsburgh, Pennsylvania	Active	(Note: Chapter originated from two Epsilon Theta Phi chapters. ΕΗΦ's Delta chapter was formed in 1935 for daytime students, and its Epsilon chapter was formed in 1947 for evening students.)
Gamma Phi	December 2, 1973 – 19xx ?	Waynesburg University	Waynesburg, Pennsylvania	Inactive	
Gamma Chi	March 30, 1974 – 1980	University of Louisville	Louisville, Kentucky	Inactive	
Gamma Psi	April 21, 1974 – 1978	Indiana University Northwest	Gary, Indiana	Inactive	
Gamma Omega	April 21, 1974 – 1985	Auburn University	Auburn, Alabama	Inactive	
Delta Alpha	April 27, 1974 – 1981	Austin Peay State University	Clarksville, Tennessee	Inactive	
Delta Beta	1974–1987	Saint Francis University	Loretto, Pennsylvania	Inactive	
Delta Gamma	May 5, 1974 – 19xx ?	Montclair State University	Montclair, New Jersey	Inactive	
Delta Delta	May 10, 1974 – 1986	Upsala College	East Orange, New Jersey	Inactive	(Note: Upsala College closed in 1995 due to declining enrollment.)
Delta Epsilon	May 11, 1974 – 1977	University of Texas–Pan American	Edinburg, Texas	Inactive	
Delta Zeta	1974–1988	Fairleigh Dickinson University	Florham Park, New Jersey	Inactive	
Delta Eta	September 12, 1974 – 1985	Louisiana Tech University	Ruston, Louisiana	Inactive	
Delta Theta	November 1, 1974 – 19xx ?	St. Cloud State University	St. Cloud, Minnesota	Inactive	
Delta Iota	November 10, 1974 – 1987	Metropolitan State University of Denver	Denver, Colorado	Inactive	
Delta Kappa	1975–1984	Suffolk University	Boston, Massachusetts	Inactive	
Delta Lambda	May 9, 1975 – 1981	University of Akron	Akron, Ohio	Inactive	
**Delta Mu**	September 2, 1975	University of Texas at Austin	Austin, Texas	Active	
Delta Nu	1975–1977	Menlo College	Atherton, California	Inactive	
**Delta Xi**	November 23, 1975	Central Michigan University	Mount Pleasant, Michigan	Active	
Delta Omicron	1975–1983, 1985–19xx ?	Texas State University	San Marcos, Texas	Inactive	
Delta Pi	1976–19xx ?	Saint Elizabeth University	Morris Township, New Jersey	Inactive	
Delta Rho	1976–1980, 1988–19xx ?	San Francisco State University	San Francisco, California	Inactive	
**Delta Sigma**	1976–1985, 1987	James Madison University	Harrisonburg, Virginia	Active	
Delta Tau	April 8, 1976 – 1985	Louisiana State University	Baton Rouge, Louisiana	Inactive	
Delta Upsilon	May 1, 1976 – 1984	Western Colorado University	Gunnison, Colorado	Inactive	
Delta Phi	February 1976–19xx ?	The College of New Jersey	Ewing Township, New Jersey	Inactive	(Note: Chapter formed at Trenton State College, now called The College of New Jersey.)
**Delta Chi**	1976	California State University, Chico	Chico, California	Active	
Delta Psi	January 1977–1987	Seton Hall University	South Orange, New Jersey	Inactive	
Delta Omega	1977–19xx ?	Slippery Rock University of Pennsylvania	Slippery Rock, Pennsylvania	Inactive	
Epsilon Alpha	1977–19xx ?	Carlow University	Pittsburgh, Pennsylvania	Inactive	
Epsilon Beta	March 19, 1978 – 19xx ?	Saint Joseph's University	Philadelphia, Pennsylvania	Inactive	
**Epsilon Gamma**	April 1, 1978	Western Michigan University	Kalamazoo, Michigan	Active	
Epsilon Delta	April 29, 1979 – 1983	University of Connecticut	Storrs, Connecticut	Inactive	
Epsilon Epsilon	May 12, 1979 – 1983	University of New Hampshire	Durham, New Hampshire	Inactive	
Epsilon Zeta	December 18, 1981 – 19xx ?	San Jose State University	San Jose, California	Inactive	
Epsilon Eta	November 13, 1982 – 1983	Florida Atlantic University	Boca Raton, Florida	Inactive	
Epsilon Theta	October 17, 1982 – 1986	South Carolina State University	Orangeburg, South Carolina	Inactive	
Epsilon Iota	October 20, 1982 – 19xx ?	University of Cincinnati	Cincinnati, Ohio	Inactive	
Epsilon Kappa	May 6, 1984 – 1987	Northwood University	Midland, Michigan	Inactive	
Epsilon Lambda	September 14, 1986 – 19xx ?	Juniata College	Huntingdon, Pennsylvania	Inactive	
Epsilon Mu (see Beta Delta)	May 9, 1987 – 19xx ?	St. John's University	New York City, New York	Inactive	
Epsilon Nu	November 8, 1987 – 19xx ?	Notre Dame College	South Euclid, Ohio	Inactive	
Epsilon Xi	February 4, 1989 – 19xx ?	Southeastern University	Washington, D.C.	Inactive	
Epsilon Omicron	May 20, 1989 – 19xx ?	Point Loma Nazarene University	Point Loma, San Diego, California	Inactive	
Epsilon Pi	October 7, 1989 – 19xx ?	Kutztown University of Pennsylvania	Kutztown, Pennsylvania	Inactive	
Epsilon Rho	May 27, 1990 – 19xx ?	University of West Georgia	Carrollton, Georgia	Inactive	
Epsilon Sigma	February 3, 1991 – 19xx ?	Shorter University	Rome, Georgia	Inactive	
Epsilon Tau				Unassigned	
Epsilon Upsilon	April 13, 1991 – 19xx ?	Wabash College	Crawfordsville, Indiana	Inactive	
**Epsilon Phi**	September 28, 1991	Michigan State University	East Lansing, Michigan	Active	
Epsilon Chi				Inactive	
Epsilon Psi				Inactive	
Epsilon Omega	1998–19xx ?	University of Texas at San Antonio	San Antonio	Inactive	
**Zeta Alpha**	September 7, 2024	University of Miami	Coral Gables, Florida	Active	
**Zeta Beta** (see Alpha Lambda)	2002	University of Michigan	Ann Arbor, Michigan	Active	
**Zeta Gamma** (see Sigma)	2004	University of Illinois Urbana-Champaign	Urbana, Illinois	Active	
Zeta Delta	2008–19xx ?	Drexel University	Philadelphia, Pennsylvania	Inactive	
**Zeta Epsilon**	2008	Grand Valley State University	Allendale Charter Township, Michigan	Active	
**Zeta Zeta**	2017	Cornell University	Ithaca, New York	Active	
**Zeta Eta** (see Nu)	2009	Indiana University Bloomington	Bloomington, Indiana	Active	
Zeta Theta				Inactive	
Zeta Iota				Inactive	
**Zeta Kappa**	2012	Binghamton University	Binghamton, New York	Active	
**Zeta Lambda**	2013	Ohio University	Athens, Ohio	Active	
**Zeta Mu**	2013	Miami University	Oxford, Ohio	Active	
**Zeta Nu** (see Tau)	2013	Ohio State University	Columbus, Ohio	Active	(Note: The Tau chapter was previously on this campus, between 1928 and 1985.)
**Zeta Xi**	2015	Drake University	Des Moines, Iowa	Active	
**Zeta Omicron**	2015	University of California, Riverside	Riverside, California	Active	
**Zeta Pi**	2016	University of Washington	Seattle, Washington	Active	
**Zeta Rho** (see Gamma Mu)	2018	University of South Florida	Tampa, Florida	Active	
**Zeta Sigma**	2018	University of South Carolina	Columbia, South Carolina	Active	
**Zeta Tau**	2018	University of Pennsylvania	Philadelphia, Pennsylvania	Active	
**Zeta Upsilon**	2019	University of San Diego	San Diego, California	Active	
**Zeta Phi**	2019	College of Charleston	Charleston, South Carolina	Active	
**Zeta Chi**	2019	University of Delaware	Newark, Delaware	Active	
**Zeta Psi**	2021	Santa Clara University	Santa Clara, California	Active	
Zeta Omega	July 2, 2022	University of California, Irvine	Irvine, California	Active	
**Eta Alpha**	April 19, 2023	University of Virginia	Charlottesville, Virginia	Active	
**Eta Beta**	April 22, 2023	University of Dayton	Dayton, Ohio	Active	
**Eta Delta**	December 6, 2023	Vanderbilt University	Nashville, Tennessee	Active	
**Eta Epsilon**	September 28, 2024	University of California, Davis	Davis, California	Active	
**Eta Gamma**	December 1, 2023	Rowan University	Glassboro, New Jersey	Active	
Eta Iota		Washington University	St. Louis, MO	Active	
