= Memphis University School =

Boys prep school Memphis, Tennessee, US

- Humphreys Hall on the Memphis University School campus is topped with the iconic cupola.

Location
- 6191 Park Avenue; Memphis, Tennessee 38119; United States; 35.098164°N 89.856146°W

Information
- Type: Independent, college-prep, single-sex, day
- Motto: Latin: Veritas Honorque (Truth and Honor)
- Established: 1893
- Founders: Edwin Sidney Werts; James White Sheffey Rhea
- Sister school: Hutchison School, St. Mary's Episcopal School
- Grades: 6–12
- Gender: Boys
- Enrollment: 605 (2026)
- Color: Yale Blue; Harvard Crimson
- Fight song: "MUS Fight Song" by William R. Hatchett and Charles Mosby
- Mascot: Lloyd the Owl
- Nickname: The Owls
- Rival: Christian Brothers High School
- Accreditation: Southern Association of Independent Schools
- Tuition: $26,800 (2026-27)
- Feeder schools: Presbyterian Day School, Grace-St. Luke's Episcopal School, Christ Methodist Day School, Woodland Presbyterian School
- Website: https://www.musowls.org/

Publications
- Newspaper: The Owl's Hoot
- Yearbook: The Owl
- Literary magazine: The MUSe
- Alumni magazine: MUS Today

Memphis University School (MUS) is a college-preparatory, independent day school for boys grades 6–12, located in Memphis, Tennessee, United States. According to its mission statement, the school is "dedicated to academic excellence, cultivation of service and leadership, and the development of well-round young men of strong moral character, consistent with the school's Christian tradition"

== History ==
=== Founding and Early Years (1893–1936) ===
Edwin Sidney Werts and James White Sheffey Rhea founded MUS as a college-preparatory school for boys in the fall of 1893. Their purpose was threefold: to prepare boys for competitive colleges, to provide them with a liberal arts education, and to help them develop into cultured Christian gentlemen. Patterned largely after Werts's alma mater, the University of Virginia, MUS embraced high academic standards, strong moral development, and an emphasis on athletics. The school adopted crimson and blue as its official colors to represent the academic standards of two universities, Harvard and Yale.

The school's reputation soon grew so strong that many of America's leading colleges began exempting MUS students from entrance examinations or allowing them to take their exams on the MUS campus. MUS prospered. Within three years it outgrew its temporary quarters in the old Bethel Building in downtown Memphis and moved into the Clara Conway Institute at 297 Poplar Avenue. Shortly afterward, the proprietors built their own facility near the corner of Madison and Manassas. The school remained there until 1936, when the economic pressures of the Great Depression, which hit Memphis and the Mid-South especially hard, forced its closure.

=== Current Campus (1955–Present) ===
The economic boom of the 1950s prompted alumni of the original MUS to relaunch the school. Col. Ross M. Lynn, then headmaster of Presbyterian Day School in Memphis, was tapped to lead the new MUS, which moved to its current 94-acre campus of fields and woods in East Memphis. Classes began in 1955 under Col. Lynn's leadership and a newly recruited faculty, with strategic direction provided by a board of trustees chaired by Alexander Wellford.

In 1958 the school graduated its first senior class. Like its predecessor, the new MUS emphasized academic excellence, high moral standards, strong athletic development, and gentlemanly conduct; its student-enforced honor system became the moral heart of the school. During the 1960s, MUS grew to maturity: Seniors gained special privileges, Hutchison School (for girls) moved in next door, Hyde Chapel was built, and modern language labs were added. Leigh MacQueen became academic dean, and beloved English teacher Bill Hatchett began guiding annual student tours to Europe, as clubs and extracurricular activities proliferated under increasing student leadership.

In the 1970s MUS added Hull Lower School, Hyde Library, and the Fisher Fine Arts Wing. Academics grew stronger amid increasing diversity, and by the 1980s enrollment had reached nearly 600 students.

In 1978, after 24 years of foundational leadership, Col. Lynn retired and was succeeded as headmaster by D. Eugene Thorn. Mr. Thorn was a Memphis native and World War II veteran who had previously served under Col. Lynn in several roles, including director of athletics and assistant headmaster. Under Thorn's leadership, enrollment grew and the school added major facilities, including the McCaughan Science Center and the Sue H. Hyde Sports and Physical Education Center.

Mr. Thorn retired in 1992, and Dr. William Campbell succeeded him as headmaster, serving for three years. In 1995 the Board of Trustees selected longtime faculty member and Upper School Principal Ellis L. Haguewood to lead the school.

Under Headmaster Haguewood and Board Chairman Ben Adams (1996–2004), MUS carried out a long-term strategic plan that included a master plan for expanding and updating the physical campus and a capital campaign that raised more than $21 million for improvements. The Crump Firm produced a master plan for the school that included a new tennis center, renovation and expansion of the Hull Lower School, and construction of a new Campus Center and Dunavant Upper School to replace the old Upper School and Clack Dining Hall. Construction was completed in January 2003.

Ellis Haguewood retired in June 2017 after 48 years of exemplary service to the school, including 22 as headmaster. (3) The Board of Trustees, under the leadership of Sam Graham (2013–2020), selected independent school veteran Peter D. (“Pete”) Sanders, from, Greenville, South Carolina, as the next headmaster.

In February 2021 Sanders and Board Chair Jim Burnett (2020–2024) announced a new strategic plan, Legacy Forward, built around six strategic goals. Among its initiatives, the plan led to the addition of a sixth grade (in the 2024–25 school year) and a campus master plan calling for five new and improved buildings, including a larger Hyde Chapel. The Bold Vision Bright Future capital campaign, with an aspirational goal of $200 million, followed immediately.

In August 2025 Board Chair Will Thompson (2024- ) and Headmaster Sanders announced that the campaign had raised $107 million and that construction had begun on a science, arts, and Hyde Chapel complex that would add 107,000 square feet to the school's physical plant. As of October 2026, the Bold Vision campaign stood at over $120 million raised. The first $50 million of that total was earmarked for endowment, commitments that were expected to increase the fund to $100 million in future years. The new Arts and Sciences Center, including a new Hyde Chapel, was scheduled to open in 2027.

In January 2026, Sanders announced his decision to retire at the end of June 2027 after 43 years in independent education and a decade at MUS. In May 2026 Board Chair Will Thompson announced the appointment of Hartwell H. (“Hart”) Roper of Nashville as the school's next headmaster, effective July 2027. Roper will be the sixth headmaster in MUS's post-1955 history.

== Academics ==
MUS enrolls about 600 students in grades 6 through 12, with a 7-to-1 student–faculty ratio and an average class size of 15. The school's academic program emphasizes Advanced Placement and Honors Accelerated coursework, offering 23 AP courses for college credit. Historically, almost 70 percent of MUS students score a 4 or 5 on their AP exams. Grades are weighted on a 4.0 scale, and MUS reports a 100% four-year college admittance rate to institutions in all U.S. time zones. Each year, a substantial share of MUS students are recognized by the National Merit Scholarship Corporation and the College Board for their performance on standardized tests. About one-third of MUS students receive financial aid, which is based on demonstrated need, and 27 percent self-report as students of color.

== Faculty ==
For the 2026–27 school year, the faculty included 90 instructors, three college counselors, two guidance counselors, and a school nurse. Seventy percent of faculty hold master's degrees or doctorates, and they average teaching experience of more than two decades.

== Community Service ==
The MUS Civic Service Organization (CSO) is the largest student organization at MUS. Although service is not a requirement, 100% of Upper School students participated in CSO events during the 2025–26 school year, totaling 8,400 volunteer hours. The school hosts monthly drive-through food distribution events, providing a week's worth of groceries to Memphians in need, in addition to many other projects.

== Notable alumni ==
- Nash Buckingham, 1898, author and conservationist
- Richard Halliburton, 1915, travel writer, adventurer
- Allen B. Morgan Jr. 1960, co-founder, CEO, and chairman of Morgan Keegan & Company
- J. R. Hyde III 1961, founder of AutoZone
- Frederick W. Smith 1962, founder, CEO of FedEx
- John Fry 1962, founder of Ardent Studios
- Charles H. Johnston 1966, United States Navy
- Michael Beck 1967, actor
- Michael O'Brien 1968, photographer
- Chris Bell 1969, musician, member of Big Star
- Andy Hummel 1969, musician, member of Big Star
- Paul Tudor Jones 1972, hedge fund manager
- Hampton Sides 1980, author, Ghost Soldiers, Blood and Thunder
- Edward Felsenthal 1984, journalist, editor-in-chief, Time Magazine
- John H. Dobbs 1985, businessman
- Griff Jenkins 1989, radio producer and Fox News television personality
- David O. Sacks 1990, founder and CEO of Web 2.0 company Geni, Inc.; former COO of PayPal; movie producer: ex. Thank You for Smoking
- Tom Hutton 1991, former University of Tennessee and NFL punter
- Siddharth Kara 1992, writer, expert on human trafficking
- Henry Gayden 1998, screenwriter, known for his writing in Earth to Echo (2014), Shazam! (2019) and There's Someone Inside Your House (2020)
- Hank Sullivant 2001, rock musician, frontman for Kuroma, past bassist for The Whigs, touring guitarist for MGMT
- Harry Ford, actor, star of CBS TV series Code Black
- Harrison Williams 2014, Olympic decathlete at Paris 2024 Summer Olympics (finished 7th)
