= Phi Chi Theta =

American professional business fraternity

- ΦΧΘ
- Founded: June 16, 1924; 102 years ago Chicago, Illinois
- Type: Professional
- Affiliation: PFA
- Former affiliation: PPA
- Status: Active
- Emphasis: Business, women's
- Scope: National
- Motto: "May the candle of knowledge guide our ship to achievement"
- Colors: Purple and Gold
- Flower: Iris
- Publication: The Iris
- Chapters: 41
- Members: 23,000 active 240,000+ lifetime
- Headquarters: 1508 E. Beltline Road, Suite 104; P. O. Box 113394; Carrollton, Texas 75011-3394; United States
- Website: www.phichitheta.org

Phi Chi Theta (ΦΧΘ or PCT) is one of the largest co-ed professional business fraternities in the United States. Phi Chi Theta was founded as a women's business fraternity on June 16, 1924, in Chicago, Illinois. Today, Phi Chi Theta comprises 41 collegiate and alumni chapters across the United States. While most chapters are now co-ed, some have only women as members.

== History ==
Phi Chi Theta was formed by the merger of two competing women's business fraternities in 1924. A meeting at the William Penn Hotel in Pittsburgh on May 16, 1924 at which the decision was made to merge the organizations. Both Phi Theta Kappa and Phi Kappa Epsilon were founded in 1918, but recognizing the benefits of cooperation, on June 16, 1924, each of the two organizations sent three delegates to form Phi Chi Theta. These six women became the founders of the fraternity: Edna Blake Davis, Mary Stoddard Duggan, Anna E. Hall, Nell McKenry, Nina Miller, and Alice Wyman Schulze.

The meeting was hosted in Chicago at the La Salle Hotel and took over two days. founding chapters to be New York Alpha (Columbia University), Colorado Alpha (University of Denver), New York Beta (New York University), Oregon Beta (University of Oregon), Gamma (Oregon State University), Delta (Northwestern University), Epsilon (University of Pittsburgh), and Zeta (Boston University).

=== Early organization ===
At first, chapters were only given to universities whose business schools were members of the American Assembly of Collegiate Schools of Business. This was changed in Chicago at the 1934 biennial meeting, where they decided to accept chapters in Rank A universities as long as the number of chapters from those schools does not exceed twenty percent of the total number of Collegiate Chapters that existed. This was further changed on June 17-20th, 1948, at the twelfth Biennial Meeting located at the Willard Hotel. It was changed so that chapters in business schools of Rank A universities would not surpass forty percent of the total number of Collegiate Chapters. In Boston during the 1952 Biennial Meeting, this was again changed to accept chapters in universities accredited by the American Assembly of Collegiate Schools of Business or the Regional Accrediting Association as long as the courses of Business Administration are approved. In 1962, the last portion of the bylaw was changed to include the study of business or economics, making Phi Chi Theta the first professional fraternity for women in Economics.

The second Biennial Meeting was in New York at the Pennsylvania Hotel on June 18 to 19, 1926, with Mrs. James L Dohr as president. The chapters installed at this meeting were Eta (University of California, Berkeley), Iota (University of Wisconsin–Madison), Kappa (University of North Dakota), Lambda (University of Kansas), Mu (University of Utah), Nu (University of Indiana), Xi (University of Southern California), Omicron (University of Missouri), and Pi (University of Idaho).

The third Biennial Meeting took place at University of California's Stephens Building from June 21 to 26, 1928, with Helen Phillips as president. The chapters installed at this meeting were Rho (University of Nebraska–Lincoln), Sigma (University of Illinois Urbana), and Tau (Ohio State University). The fourth Biennial Meeting took place in Boston, Massachusetts at the Hotel Vendome on June 20 to 24, 1930 with Ethel M. Allen as president. A single chapter was installed at this meeting, Upsilon (Georgia School of Technology).

The fifth Biennial Meeting took place in Denver, Colorado, at the Brown Palace Hotel from June 24 to 28, 1932. No new chapters were installed in this meeting. The sixth Biennial Meeting took place in Chicago at the Stevens Hotel from June 21 to 26, 1934, with Elsa Mueller as president. During this meeting, a national scholarship was approved. The seventh Biennial Meeting took place in Oregon at the Hotel Multnomah from June 22 to 25, 1936, with Ida Belle Tremayne as president. A single chapter was installed at this meeting, Phi (University of Colorado).

The eighth Biennial Meeting took place in Pittsburgh, Pennsylvania, at the Hotel Schenley from June 16 to 20, 1938. The president was Nellie Jones, and the chapters that were installed were Chi (University of Alabama), Psi (Brigham Young University), Omega (University of California, Los Angeles). Omega chapter was later changed to be called Alpha Alpha because Omega contained a negative meaning of "the end" for the members.

The ninth Biennial Meeting took place in Atlanta, Georgia, at the Atlanta Biltmore Hotel from June 17 to 20, 1940. The president was Alma Martin, and the Alpha Beta chapter at (Marquette University)was installed. The tenth Biennial Meeting took place in Madison, Wisconsin, at Hotel Loraine from June 18 to 22, 1942, with Phyllis Buck as president. No chapters were installed that year. Phi Chi Theta cancelled the scheduled 1944 biennial meeting due to World War II, but interestingly, Alpha Gamma at Southern Methodist University was installed in 1944 through the mail. The eleventh Biennial Meeting took place in Indiana at the French Lick Springs Hotel on June 27 to 30, 1946. The president was Ellen Hawley, and no chapter was added at this meeting.

The twelfth Biennial Meeting took place in Washington, D.C. at the Willard Hotel from June 17 to 19, 1948. The president was Althea Christenson and the chapters installed at this meeting were Alpha Delta (State College of Washington), Alpha Epsilon (University of Georgia), and Alpha Zeta (Montana State University). The thirteenth Biennial Meeting took place in Chicago, Illinois, at Hotel Ambassador East from June 15 to 17, 1950. The president was Claire O' Reilly and chapter Alpha Eta (Saint Louis University) was installed while Xi chapter became inactive.

=== Merger, and expansion ===
On July 27, 1973, Epsilon Eta Phi, a similar but smaller fraternity, merged into Phi Chi Theta. At the time of the merger, Epsilon Eta Phi had five active and two inactive chapters. Its active groups were Alpha (Northwestern), Beta (DePaul), Delta (Duquesne day school), Epsilon (Duquesne night school), and Eta (Hardin-Simmons). Its inactive chapters were Gamma (Boston) and Zeta (Beaver College (Arcadia)).

It appears that this merger was intended to provide continuity for alumnae; the Full History mentions initiation ceremonies held in Chicago (near Northwestern and DePaul) and in Pittsburgh (near Duquesne) for collegians and alumnae. But the only new chapter that came about from the matter was the Gamma Upsilon chapter at Duquesne, later in 1973. Epsilon Eta Phi's Northwestern members appear to have been absorbed into the Phi Chi Theta chapter there, and there was no further chapter formation or renaming of the existing groups at DePaul or Hardin-Simmons.

=== Title IX ===
The fraternity is now co-educational, after first rejecting this change at the 1972 biennial convention, studying the matter further, and finally adopting a co-ed model at the biennial meeting held between June 22, 1976 and June 27, 1976. This change was prompted by Title IX, Federal legislation that led to similar moves by most professional and honor societies which were not already coeducational. Where previously men's and women's groups operated as cordial peers, each serving their constituencies, the rapid adoption of co-educational models led inadvertently to mergers and absorption of smaller groups. Phi Chi Theta survived to become one of the largest of the remaining business fraternities.

Chapter and alumnae club growth has continued for Phi Chi Theta in the subsequent decades. The fraternity's 100th chapter, Delta Epsilon (Pan American) was installed on May 11, 1974.

== Symbols ==
Phi Chi Theta's motto is "May the candle of knowledge guide our ship to achievement". Its colors are purple and gold. Purpose, means purple, the royal color. It is made with a mixture of red, for courage and blue for loyalty. Gold is the color yellow. It symbolizes light and the sun, suggesting golden opportunities. Its flower is the iris. Its publication is The Iris.

== Membership ==
Phi Chi Theta's initiated membership includes three classes: collegiate, alumni, and life members.

A collegiate member is an initiated member working towards an undergraduate bachelor's degree or a graduate student who is studying Economics or Business. In the past couple of years, select chapters such as New York Beta and Alpha Omega have also accepted undergraduate students who are studying Computer Science, Engineering, or HR Management. This has diversified the professional experiences and skills that members bring to their respective chapters. Every pledge in a Collegiate Chapter has to go through a pledging period that can range anywhere from one month to one year. Every pledge receives a Pledge Pin at the beginning of pledging, and it will be returned to the chapter at the end of the pledging period. Pledges need to pass a Pledge Test on materials in the official Pledge Manual to become an official member.

An Alumna or Alumnus (colloquially an "Alum") is an initiated member who has received a Bachelor's degree, or a Collegiate Member who is not currently studying in school. A Life Member is an Alumni Member who has obtained a Life Membership in the Fraternity.

In addition, the fraternity awards honorary memberships.

== Chapters ==
Phi Chi Theta comprises 41 collegiate and alumni chapters across the United States. While most chapters are now co-ed, there are some which have only women as members. The fraternity has also formed several alumni chapters.

== Notable members ==
- David Dodd, professor emeritus in finance at Columbia University and associate dean at the Columbia Business School

=== Honorary members ===
The fraternity has occasionally awarded honorary membership.

- Booz Allen Hamilton - the global strategy and technology consulting firm
- Madeline McWhinney Dale - president of First Women's Bank of New York
- Lillian Moller Gilbreth - president of Gilbreth, Inc.
- Bernice Fitz-Gibbon - president of Bernice Fitz-Gibbon, Inc. advertising consultants
- Ruth Handler - president of Ruthton Corporation
- David Cay Johnston - Pulitzer Prize winning journalist
- Gloria Jean Kvetko - founder of Gloria Jean's Coffees
- Lynn Morley Martin - United States Secretary of Labor
- R. Clayton McWhorter - president and chief executive officer of the Hospital Corporation of America from 1985 to 1987.
- Esther Peterson, former White House Consumer Advisor
- Sylvia Porter, nationally syndicated columnist
- William C. Rhodes III, CEO of AutoZone
- Marge Schott, owner, chairman, president, and chief executive officer of the Cincinnati Reds
- Jane Scully – President, Carlow College, Pittsburgh, Pennsylvania
- Leonor Sullivan, member United States House of Representatives from Missouri
- Sol Trujillo, president and CEO of US West
- Marilyn Van Derbur – Miss Colorado 1957. Miss America 1958

== See also ==
- Professional fraternities and sororities
