= Allen B. Morgan Jr. =

American businessman

Allen Benners Morgan Jr. is an American businessman who was a co-founder and chairman and CEO of regional brokerage firm Morgan Keegan & Company, based in Memphis, Tennessee. The firm is now owned by Raymond James Financial.

== Early life ==
Morgan was born in Memphis, the son of Allen Benners Morgan and Elise Wetter Morgan. His father was the chairman and CEO of First Tennessee Bank, then known as First National Bank. (Elise Wetter Morgan died on October 23, 2011, and a private family burial was held at Elmwood Cemetery for her. Her husband pre-deceased her in 1998.) He had a sister, Elise Stratton Morgan, and brother, Henry Wetter Morgan. He attended high school at Memphis University School, and graduated in 1960.

He graduated from the University of North Carolina at Chapel Hill. Morgan could not work at First National, which had a nepotism rule, so in 1965 he began his career in the brokerage business, in the Memphis office of Courts & Co., an Atlanta-based brokerage.

== Morgan Keegan ==
Two years later, at age 27, he left Courts. With some advice from his father, he started a brokerage firm with friend James Keegan. Keegan was an over-the-counter trader at Equitable Securities in Nashville. The pair recruited Robert Gooch, who was with Kohlmeyer & Co., and accountant Joseph C. Weller. The firm, Morgan Keegan, was started in 1969 with five employees and $500,000 in capital.

The firm grew, and as it did, Morgan gained respect within the financial services industry. In 2002, Morgan was selected as the chairman of the board of the Securities Industry Association.

The firm's day-to-day operations was run by Morgan, as chairman and CEO, from 1969 until 2003. In 2003, he named Doug Edwards as the CEO and retained the chairman's title until his retirement on December 31, 2007.

During the merger frenzy within regional brokerages of the late 1990s and early 2000s, the firm was sold to Birmingham-based Regions Financial. Due to his concentration in Morgan Keegan stock at that time of the merger, Morgan remains the largest non-institutional shareholder of Regions, according to Bloomberg. As such, Morgan became vice chairman of Regions, although he retired from the board at the end of 2007, and remained the brokerage unit's chairman emeritus until it was sold to Raymond James Financial in 2012.

== Controversy ==
In December 2010, Morgan was charged by the Securities and Exchange Commission (SEC) along with eight other directors of mutual funds. The so-called Kelsoe funds, which were bond funds that bought assets backed by subprime mortgages, collapsed in 2007 during the subprime mortgage crisis. The SEC accused that the "directors made little effort to learn how the values were being determined". The firm settled its charges in 2011, but the fund directors would hold out until 2013.

== Personal life ==
Morgan is married to Musette and has three adult children: Kendall Morgan Rhodes, Musette Morgan, and Worth Morgan.

Morgan's civic and cultural involvements have included the State of Tennessee Building Finance Committee, Methodist Hospitals, the Community Foundation of Greater Memphis, Allen Morgan Health Center, Opera Memphis, and Dixon Gallery and Gardens.
