= Craigmont High School (Memphis, Tennessee) =

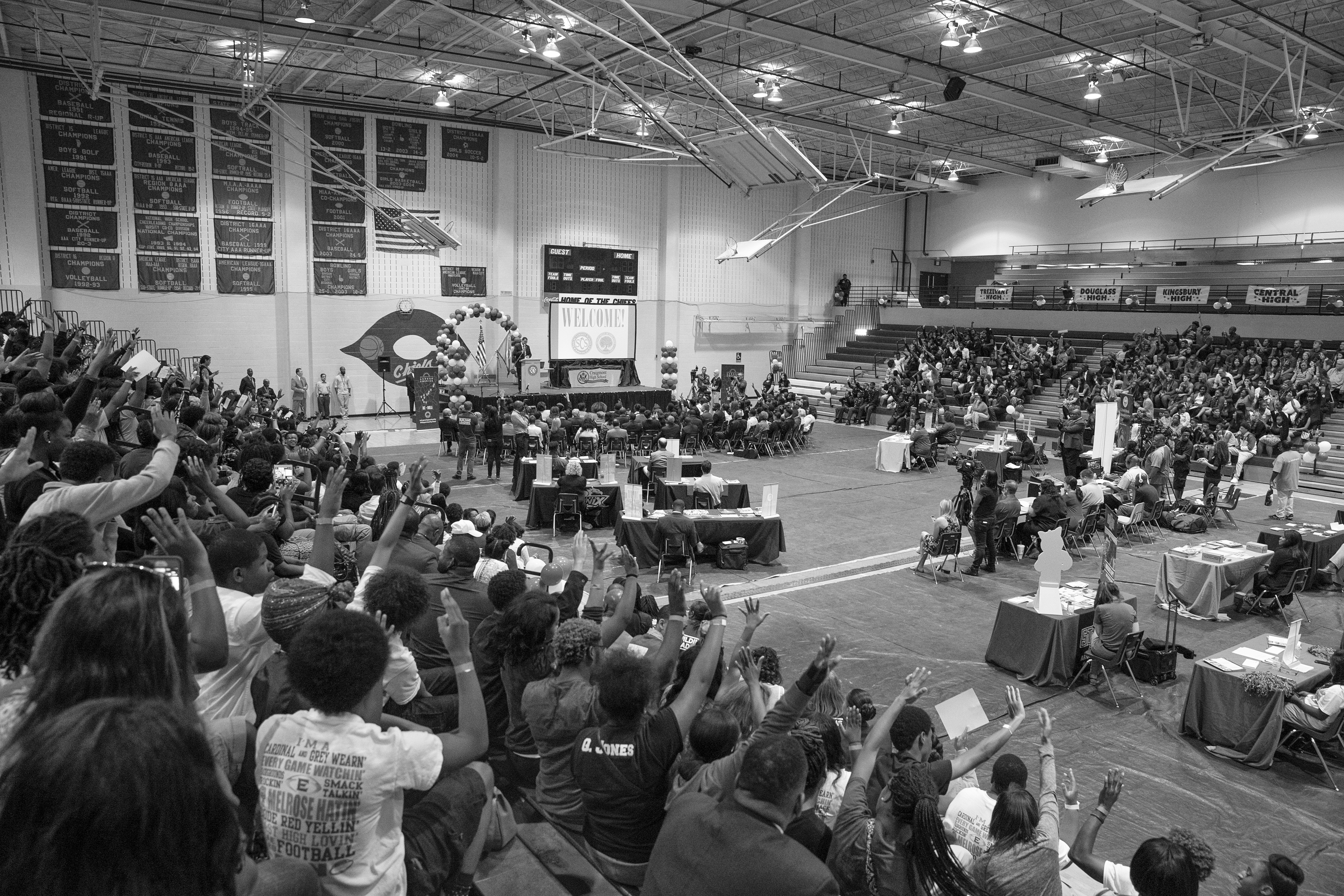
- U.S. Secretary of Education John King Jr. at the school, 2016

Location
- 3333 Covington Pike; Memphis, Tennessee; United States; 35.2164°N 89.89554°W

Information
- Type: Public high school
- Established: 1974
- School district: Shelby County Schools
- Principal: Derek King
- Teaching staff: 52.98 (FTE)
- Enrollment: 867 (2023-2024)
- Student to teacher ratio: 16.36
- Colors: Maroon and gray
- Mascot: Chief
- Website: schools.scsk12.org/craigmont-hs

Craigmont High School is a public high school (grades 9–12) located in Memphis, Tennessee, in the Raleigh community. It was part of the Memphis City Schools district before consolidation with the Shelby County Schools district, beginning with the 2013-14 school year. It is home to the district's only International Studies magnet program.

== History ==
The school first opened in 1974 for only 7th through 10th grade students, but each subsequent year, added a grade higher. The first graduating class was the class of 1976. Beginning with the 1991-1992 school year, students from grade 9 would become part of the senior high section of the building.

In 2001, the 7th and 8th grade students, along with the 6th grade students from Brownsville Road Optional Elementary School, formed the new Craigmont Middle School at the opposite end of the same block. This was done both to help overcrowding and to reduce the extreme age and maturity gaps present in a single building. Before the physical split between junior and senior high schools, junior high students (those in grades 7, 8, & 9) remain relegated to the north end of the building for classes while those senior high students (grades 10, 11, & 12) attended the majority of their classes in the south end of the school building.

Former principal, Dr. Ada Jane Walters, would go on to become the Tennessee State Commissioner of Education.

== Academics ==
=== Enrollment ===
As of the 2023-2024 school year, Craigmont High School has an enrollment of 867 students.

- Black - 83.6%
- Hispanic - 9.1%
- White - 1.4%
- Multiple Races - 5.5%

=== Awards ===
- Blue Ribbon Award, 1992, 1993

== Planetarium ==
Craigmont High School is one of four schools in the state of Tennessee that has a planetarium. The planetarium opened alongside the school in 1975 and hosted plays and an event during the 1986 visit of Halley's Comet. The projection equipment stopped working in 2010, leading to a 2016 fundraising campaign. The equipment was updated in 2018 with funding from Shelby County Schools and donors.

== Notable alumni ==
- Darren Benson, former NFL player for the Dallas Cowboys
- Katori Hall, who won the 2010 Olivier Award for Best Play with The Mountaintop and won the 2021 Pulitzer Prize for her play “The Hot Wing King”
- Brian Christopher Lawler, professional wrestler in the WWE
- Abdulhakim Mujahid Muhammad, formerly known as Carlos Leon Bledsoe, charged in the 2009 jihadi Little Rock military recruiting office shooting.
- William C. Rhodes, CEO of AutoZone
- David West, Major League pitcher
- Terrico White, basketball player drafted in 2010 by the Detroit Pistons
