= Regions Trust =

- Company type: Subsidiary of Regions Financial Corporation
- Industry: Financial
- Founded: 2002 as Regions Morgan Keegan Trust
- Headquarters: Birmingham, Alabama, USA
- Products: Investments
- Website: http://www.morgankeegan.com

Former Logo of Regions Morgan Keegan Trust

Regions Trust, formerly Regions Morgan Keegan Trust is the trust division of Regions Financial Corporation and its subsidiary Regions Wealth Management. The company, headquartered in Birmingham, Alabama and was created in 2002 when Regions Trust was combined with Morgan Keegan Trust to create Regions Morgan Keegan Trust. The division is made up of Regions Trust, Morgan Asset Management, and RMK Timberland Group.

== See also ==
- Regions Financial Corporation
- Morgan Keegan & Company
