= Darren Benson =

American football player (born 1974)

No. 91
- Position: Defensive tackle

Personal information
- Born: August 25, 1974 (age 52); Memphis, Tennessee, U.S.
- Listed height: 6 ft 7 in (2.01 m)
- Listed weight: 308 lb (140 kg)

Career information
- High school: Craigmont (Memphis)
- College: Trinity Valley
- Supplemental draft: 1995: 3rd round

Career history
- Dallas Cowboys (1995–1998)

Awards and highlights
- Super Bowl champion (XXX)

Career NFL statistics
- Tackles: 7
- Stats at Pro Football Reference

Darren L. Benson (born August 25, 1974) is an American former professional football player who was a defensive tackle for the Dallas Cowboys of the National Football League. He was selected by the Dallas Cowboys in the third round of the 1995 supplemental draft. He played college football at Trinity Valley Community College.

== Early life and education ==
Benson attended Craigmont High School, where he played as a defensive tackle. He accepted a football scholarship from Arkansas State University. He didn't play in his first year because of failing to meet the grades requirements of Proposition 48.

In 1993, he transferred to Trinity Valley Community College. As a freshman, he contributed to the team having an 11–1 record, while collecting 82 tackles and 10 sacks.

As a sophomore, he played a key role in the undefeated (12–0) 1994 NJCA Championship team, posting 109 tackles (20 for loss) and 21 sacks.

== Professional career ==
Benson was selected by the Dallas Cowboys in the third-round (1st overall) of the 1995 supplemental draft, surrendering by rule an equivalent pick in the 1996 NFL draft. The Cowboys thought Benson had the athletic potential to develop into a Leon Lett type player. As a 21-year-old rookie, he was deactivated during the first half of the 1995 season, until injuries on the defensive line gave him a chance to have a reserve role throughout the second half of the season. Including pairing with Lett on the field goal rush team. He finished with 4 defensive tackles.

In 1996, he was having problems adjusting to the professional game and decided to quit the team during mini-camp. After he was convinced to return, he suffered torn anterior and medial collateral ligaments in his left knee during a practice and was placed on the injured reserve list on August 20.

In 1997, he was deactivated in the first 3 games of the season. He was deactivated for the fifth game against the New York Giants. He moved into the defensive tackle rotation after Chad Hennings suffered a groin injury. He was declared inactive in five straight games after Hennings returned from his injury. He played in the season finale against the Cincinnati Bengals and had 4 tackles. He recorded 7 tackles (one for loss) during the season.

In 1998, he suffered a torn right anterior cruciate ligament in the fourth preseason game against the St. Louis Rams. He was placed on the injured reserve list on August 24.

In 1999, he was released before the season started on September 6. He finished his career with 11 tackles (one for loss).
