= Presbyterian Day School =

Coordinates: 35.1237°N 89.9292°W

Information
- Type: Private, single-sex, day
- Motto: Quaque Sunt Vera (Latin) ("Whatsoever Things are True")
- Religious affiliations: Christianity, Presbyterian Church
- Established: 1949
- Head teacher: Brad Sewell
- Faculty: 100+
- Gender: Male
- Age range: 2-year-olds through 6th grade
- Enrollment: 500
- Colors: Red and Blue
- Mascot: The Crusader
- Accreditation: SACS, NAIS, SAIS, TAIS, MAIS, ERB
- Website: pdsmemphis.org

Presbyterian Day School (PDS) is a Christian private school for boys in Memphis, Tennessee, United States. It is one of the largest elementary schools for boys in the United States, enrolling 500 students in grades from two years of age through the sixth grade.

== Founding ==
When Dr. Anthony Dick accepted the pastorate of Second Presbyterian Church in the summer of 1947, he expressed his desire that the church provide Christian elementary education with a day school. Dr. Dick opened a new kindergarten in the fall of 1949 at the intersection of Poplar and Goodlett, where school met Monday through Friday and Sunday school on Sunday. An introductory statement sent to church members stated, "We believe that this field (Christian education) offers a real challenge to us and through the medium of this weekday kindergarten, we are preparing to try to use this opportunity for the greatest good to these children, their homes, and to the highest glory of God." The school would later be named Presbyterian Day School.

PDS registration was initially opened to church members on June 2, 1949, but was opened to non-members the following day. When the education building, the first of three planned construction units, was dedicated on September 11, 1949, 35 children were enrolled in pre-kindergarten and kindergarten.

== Accreditation ==
PDS has been accredited by the Southern Association of Colleges and Schools since 1979. It is a member of the National Association of Independent Schools, Southern Association of Independent Schools, Tennessee Association of Independent School, and the Memphis Association of Independent Schools. Other memberships include the Educational Records Bureau.

PDS was recognized in 2015 as an Apple Distinguished School because of its one-to-one laptop program and integration of educational technology using Apple hardware, apps, and content-creation apps.

== Campus ==
Presbyterian Day School is located on the 29 acre campus of Second Presbyterian Church in East Memphis. The facilities, colorful, boy-themed, and state-of-the-art, include 44 classrooms, as well as dedicated learning spaces for music, art, science, and library.

Two gymnasiums (including a double gym with an elevated track) and a lifetime fitness center with a rock climbing wall and high ropes elements are a key part of ensuring boys have opportunities to stay active.

Many of the classrooms have standing desks, bungee chairs for bouncing, and write-on walls and desks for scribbling out ideas.

== Notable alumni ==
- Harry Ford, actor, star of CBS TV series CODEBLACK
- Tom Hutton, former NFL punter, primarily with the Philadelphia Eagles
- Pitt Hyde, founder of Autozone
- Paul Tudor Jones, commodity trader
- Hampton Sides, author, Ghost Soldiers
- Frederick W. Smith, founder of FedEx
- Hank Sullivant, musician, frontman for Kuroma, past bassist for The Whigs, touring guitarist for MGMT
