= Tom Hutton (American football) =

American football player (born 1972)

No. 4
- Position: Punter

Personal information
- Born: July 8, 1972 (age 54); Memphis, Tennessee, U.S.
- Listed height: 6 ft 1 in (1.85 m)
- Listed weight: 200 lb (91 kg)

Career information
- College: Tennessee
- NFL draft: 1995: undrafted

Career history
- Philadelphia Eagles (1995–1998); Miami Dolphins (1999); Green Bay Packers (2000)*
- * Offseason or practice squad member only

Awards and highlights
- PFWA All-Rookie Team (1995)
- Stats at Pro Football Reference

William Thomas Hutton (born July 8, 1972) is a former professional football player who was a punter. As an undrafted free agent, Hutton played for four seasons for the Philadelphia Eagles of the National Football League where he averaged 42.4 yards on 349 punts, and had 77 of his kicks downed inside the 20-yard line. Hutton played for the Miami Dolphins in 1999 and was with the Green Bay Packers during the 2000 training camp. In his elementary years, he attended Presbyterian Day School and Woodland Presbyterian School. He proceeded to Memphis University School for high school, where he graduated in 1991. He then walked on and played college football at the Tennessee Volunteers, where he was the starting punter for four years. He lives in Memphis. He has a wife and two daughters.
