= Pitt Hyde =

American businessman

Joseph Reeves Hyde III (born 1942), known as Pitt Hyde, is an American entrepreneur and philanthropist in Memphis, Tennessee. He is best known for founding AutoZone as a spinoff of his family's grocery business, Malone and Hyde, in 1979. Hyde is also a part-owner of the Memphis Grizzlies.

Hyde graduated from the University of North Carolina with a degree in economics. He is a member of Presbyterian Church and studied at the Presbyterian Day School and Memphis University School.

Together with his wife, Barbara Rosser Hyde, Pitt runs the Hyde Family Foundation which works for the betterment of Memphis through hands-on philanthropy.

== Awards and honors ==
- 1998 Golden Plate Award of the American Academy of Achievement
- 2002 AXA Liberty Bowl Distinguished Citizen Award
- 2004 Automotive Hall of Fame
- 2007 Francis Gassner Award of the Memphis chapter of the American Institute of Architects
- The Society of Entrepreneurs Hall of Honor
