= ALLDATA =

Automotive software company

ALLDATA LLC.
- Company type: Subsidiary of AutoZone
- Industry: Automotive Software
- Founded: Elk Grove, California (1986)
- Headquarters: Elk Grove, California, United States
- Products: ALLDATA Repair, ALLDATA Mobile, ALLDATA Collision, ALLDATA Manage Online, ALLDATA Community, ALLDATA Tech-Assist, ALLDATA Diagnostics
- Website: alldata.com

ALLDATA LLC is an online source for automotive original equipment manufacturer (OEM) information. ALLDATA provides vehicle manufacturers' diagnostic and repair information.

ALLDATA was founded in 1986 to meet market demand for OE repair information. As computer technology took hold, ALLDATA began compiling the largest single source of OEM information available and converted it into a digital format. ALLDATA is known for online OEM information, used by over 300,000 professional technicians worldwide. The company expanded its product line to include collision information, business tools and support services for the global automotive industry.

== History ==
ALLDATA was founded in 1986 in Elk Grove, California, in order to help technicians access OEM information needed to complete repairs.

ALLDATA was purchased by AutoZone in 1996 for $56.8 million. In 2007, the company introduced ALLDATA Collision for the collision repair market. In May 2009, the company entered into an agreement with the automobile insurance company Esurance, giving estimators access to vehicle repair information in ALLDATA Collision.

In 2012, Training Garage was launched, offering a comprehensive online training resource for shop staff. The company also signed an agreement with CARSTAR to exclusively provide the Collision S3500 software to 400 auto body repair facilities. ALLDATA introduced ALLDATA Repair to the European Union market in September 2012. It also launched a shop management system, mobile app, and community forum in 2013. ALLDATA Community surpassed 70,000 unique users less than two years later.

In 2014, ALLDATA began offering Tech-Assist, which provides phone-based diagnostic support. In October 2015, the company announced it had signed a licensing agreement with Volvo to include repair information in ALLDATA Repair. In November, it also signed an agreement with AAMCO to deliver a customized shop management system a POS system.

By 2016, the company had captured 95% of the OEM market. It signed a licensing agreement with Hyundai Motor Europe to include manufacturer-specific repair information in ALLDATA Repair. In 2017, ALLDATA signed a distribution deal with Euro Car Parts and a reseller agreement to serve CAB Group customers with OEM repair information. It also signed a reseller agreement in 2018 that allowed Autologic Diagnostics to distribute ALLDATA Repair to its customers.

In 2021, ALLDATA, together with the Automotive Service Excellence Education Foundation, launched a toolkit for vocational training programs. The company unveiled ALLDATA Inspections as a customer check-in and digital vehicle inspections tool in October 2022.
