= University of Tennessee at Martin =

Public university in Martin, Tennessee, US

Coordinates: 36°20′30″N 88°52′02″W

The University of Tennessee at Martin
- Former names: University of Tennessee Junior College (1927–1951); University of Tennessee, Martin Branch (1951–1967)
- Motto: "Elevate your future at UT Martin"
- Type: Public university
- Established: 1927
- Parent institution: UT System
- Endowment: $51 million (2021)
- Chancellor: Yancy E. Freeman
- Provost: Laurie Couch
- Administrative staff: 835
- Students: 7,507 (fall 2024)
- Undergraduates: 6,817 (fall 2024)
- Postgraduates: 690 (fall 2024)
- Location: Martin, Tennessee, U.S.
- Campus: Suburban, 250 acres (100 ha)
- Colors: Navy blue and orange
- Nickname: Skyhawks
- Sporting affiliations: NCAA Division I FCS – Ohio Valley Conference
- Mascot: Captain Skyhawk
- Website: utm.edu

The University of Tennessee at Martin (UT Martin or UTM) is a public university in Martin, Tennessee, United States. It is one of the five campuses of the University of Tennessee system and the only public university in West Tennessee, excluding Memphis.

UTM operates a large experimental farm and several satellite centers in West Tennessee.

== History ==
Although UT Martin dates from 1927, it is not the first educational institution to use the current site. In 1900, Ada Gardner Brooks donated a site on what was then the outskirts of Martin to the Tennessee Baptist Convention for the purposes of opening a school. The school opened as the Hall-Moody Institute, named for two local Baptist ministers – John Newton Hall and Joseph Burnley Moody. It originally offered 13 years of study, from elementary grades to the equivalent of the first years of collegiate work. The institute changed its name to Hall-Moody Normal School in 1917, as teacher training became its primary focus. Five years later, Hall-Moody changed its name again to Hall-Moody Junior College. Due to declining enrollment and financial difficulties in the mid-1920s, Hall-Moody Junior College was in danger of closing. In 1927, the Tennessee Baptist Convention made the decision to consolidate Hall-Moody with a similar institution, Union University, in nearby Jackson.

Upon hearing of the impending closure of the Hall-Moody campus, area civic and political leaders asked the state of Tennessee to step in and take over the former Hall-Moody facilities under the auspices of the University of Tennessee. University of Tennessee president Harcourt Morgan agreed to accept the proposition on the condition that the Martin community would acquire the property as well as space for expansion. The City of Martin and Weakley County sold bonds to purchase the campus and some surrounding land. On February 10, 1927, Senate Bill Number 301 established the University of Tennessee Junior College in Martin. On March 29, it was officially approved by Governor Austin Peay. Hall-Moody closed for the last time on June 1, and the new UT Junior College began operations on September 2 with 120 students.

UT Martin nearly closed twice during its first quarter-century. During the hard times of the Great Depression, with tight state budgets and slow-growing enrollment that by 1933 had only increased slightly to 137 students, Tennessee slashed its annual budget by half to $36,000. Support from UT acting president James Hoskins kept UT Martin alive but could not save chief executive Porter Claxton's position.

Though enrollment had surpassed 400 students by 1937, many college-age males enlisted in World War II a few years later. Executive officer Paul Meek repurposed a 1940 program training Army Air Corps pilots into a program training naval air cadets. Each cadet brought nine times as much income to UT Martin as a civilian student.

A post-war influx of returning servicemen and the G.I. Bill ushered in rapid growth both in enrollment and educational offerings. In 1951, with the addition of four-year fields of study leading to a bachelor's degree, it was redesignated the University of Tennessee Martin Branch (UTMB).

In 1961, UTMB was the first campus in the University of Tennessee system to begin racial desegregation of undergraduates. (Graduate schools at other campuses had begun desegregation in 1952.)

Until 1967, it was treated as an off-site department of the main campus in Knoxville. As such, its presiding officer was known first as an executive officer (1927–1951), then a dean (1951–1967). In 1967, it was granted equal status with the main campus in Knoxville under its current name, and its presiding officer was granted the title of chancellor. The school grew greatly from the post-World War II era, largely under the influence of the G. I. Bill of Rights, through the 1960s under the leadership of Paul Meek, who led the school from 1934 to 1967. The school had almost as many entering freshmen in 1969 as it had overall students in 1961. Enrollment as of 2017 is listed at approximately 6,800.

=== Chancellors ===
1. C. Porter Claxton (executive officer, 1927–1934)
2. Paul Meek (executive officer, 1934–1951; dean, 1951–1967, chancellor, 1967)
3. Archie R. Dykes (chancellor, 1967–1971)
4. Larry T. McGehee (chancellor, 1971–1979)
5. Charles E. Smith (chancellor, 1980–1985)
6. Margaret N. Perry (chancellor, 1986–1997)
7. Philip W. Conn (chancellor, 1998–2000)
8. Nick Dunagan (chancellor, 2001–2007)
9. Thomas A. Rakes (chancellor, 2007–2015)
10. Robert M. Smith (chancellor, 2015–2016)
11. Keith S. Carver Jr. (chancellor, 2017–2/2023; Philip A. Cavalier, interim, March - August 2023)
12. Yancy E. Freeman (chancellor, effective 8/9/23)

== Academics ==
Given its rural location, much of the focus of the school has been on undergraduate studies in agriculture, although many other courses of study are offered, particularly in the liberal arts, and in recent years there has been an increasing emphasis on business, engineering, and music. There is an active ROTC program and a school of nursing. The school is among the top providers of candidates to the University of Tennessee Health Science Center in Memphis. There is a growing graduate school, with most graduate degrees being conferred in education and business.

The university is regionally accredited by the Southern Association of Colleges and Schools. For one year, from December 2015 until December 2016, the university was on probation for "falling short of standards related to evidence of institutional effectiveness and general education competencies." During the tenure of Robert Smith, UT Martin successfully met the challenge and was removed from probation. For this and other accomplishments during his 19 months as interim chancellor, the UT Board of Trustees honored Smith by removing the designation "interim" and officially named him the university's tenth chancellor.

=== Colleges and departments ===
- College of Agriculture and Applied Sciences
- College of Business and Global Affairs
- College of Education, Health, and Behavioral Sciences
- College of Engineering and Natural Sciences
- College of Humanities and Fine Arts

=== Rankings ===
Academic rankings

Regional
- U.S. News & World Report: 20 (tie)

U.S. News & World Report in its 2024 edition ranked the university tied for #27 in Regional Universities South. UT Martin is one of the most environmentally responsible colleges in the United States and Canada, according to the second annual edition of The Princeton Review's Guide to 311 Green Colleges: 2011 Edition. UT Martin is one of three public institutions in Tennessee included in the guide. UT Martin is also among the safest public college campuses in Tennessee based on crime statistics released by the Tennessee Bureau of Investigation.

== Campus ==
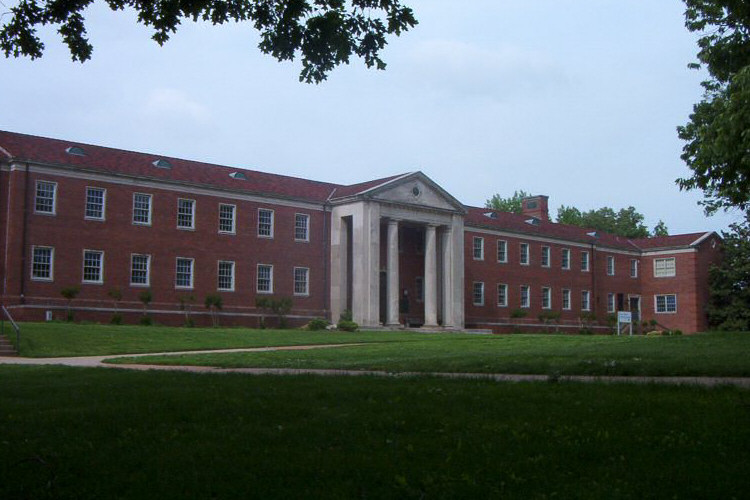
Hall-Moody Administration Building

The rural campus is noted for being particularly scenic and well-landscaped. Students who live on campus are within walking distance of all academic buildings, the library, food services, the Boling University Center, and all recreational and sports facilities. Recent years have seen the demolition of old double-occupancy dormitory halls in favor of the construction of apartment-style housing.

UT Martin also has five centers throughout West Tennessee, namely: Jackson, Parsons, Ripley, Selmer, and Somerville.

== Athletics ==
The UT Martin athletic program is a member of the Ohio Valley Conference (OVC) and competes in the NCAA Division I Football Championship Subdivision.

The school's teams are known as the Skyhawks; the team colors are navy blue, orange, and white; and the mascot is Captain Skyhawk.

Athletic teams have participated in the Ohio Valley Conference since 1991. Previously, UTM was a member of the Gulf South Conference.

The university mascot was changed from "Pacers" to "Skyhawks" in 1995.

Prior to being known as "Pacers", the university's teams were called "Volunteers". The name was changed in 1971, largely because, on account of the former junior college status of the school, the teams were often referred to as the "Baby Vols".

== Publications and media ==
=== Print ===
Founded in 1928, The Pacer is the present day name of the student newspaper. The Office of Student Publications publishes The Pacer every Thursday morning throughout the semester except for holidays and exam periods. As of 2006, the newspaper has a circulation of 3,000 copies. In the spring of 2006, the publication won the distinction of being named "Best in the South" at the Southeastern Journalism Conference, beating out such schools as Vanderbilt and Mississippi State. Throughout its history, the newspaper has also been named The Checkerboard and The Volette.

Beanswitch is a literary magazine run by UT Martin's undergraduates. This magazine publishes non-fiction, fiction, and poetry, in addition to artwork. Each fall, an online edition is published. The spring edition is in print. Submissions are accepted from all students and from staff.

=== Radio ===
The campus radio station at the University of Tennessee at Martin has been named the nation's Best Overall Radio Station (2012). The honor—the Abraham & Borst Award—was presented to WUTM at the Intercollegiate Broadcasting System Conference in New York. WUTM was also chosen Best College/University Station under 10,000 enrollment in both 2012 and 2016.

WUTM-FM was named 2015 "Best College Radio Station in the South", the fifth time in seven years for the station to earn the award and earned a Platinum Award, the highest ranking, for the sixth consecutive year from the Intercollegiate Broadcasting System (IBS).

=== Television ===
WLJT-TV was launched in the fall of 2015.

== Student life ==
Undergraduate demographics as of Fall 2023
Race and ethnicity	Total
White	77%
Black	13%
Hispanic	5%
Two or more races	4%
Asian	1%
Economic diversity
Low-income (Note: The percentage of students who received an income-based federal Pell grant intended for low-income students.)	46%
Affluent (Note: The percentage of students who are a part of the American middle class at the bare minimum.)	54%

The campus is home to many student organizations. It also is the location of the 1965 founding of the medical fraternity Mu Epsilon Delta. Several fraternities and sororities are on campus. Religious Life is also a part of student life at UT Martin: Baptist Collegiate Ministry, Church of Christ Student Center, and Wesley Foundation.

== Notable alumni ==
- Gin Cooley (2016) professional model, Canadian film festival winner, singer-songwriter and human rights advocate
- Elizabeth Donald (1997) journalist and horror novelist
- Lin Dunn (1969) head coach of the 2012 WNBA Champions Indiana Fever
- Doc Gamble (1995) University of Arkansas at Pine Bluff head Football coach
- Leonard Hamilton (1971) Florida State Seminoles head basketball coach
- Roy Herron (1975) Chairman for Tennessee Democratic Party and former State Senator
- Andy Holt (2007) U.S. politician who serves in the Tennessee General Assembly, representing District 76
- Lester Hudson (2009) Memphis Grizzlies point guard
- Montori Hughes (2013) Nose tackle for the Indianapolis Colts
- Ed Jones (1932) Commissioner of Agriculture of Tennessee 1949–1953 and a U.S. Representative from Tennessee from 1969 to 1989
- Van Jones (1990) attorney and internationally recognized civil and human rights advocate
- Alec Mills (2012) Chicago Cubs pitcher
- Jerry Reese (1985) general manager of the New York Giants
- William C. Rhodes (1987) president and CEO of AutoZone, Inc.
- Ron Roberts (1990) Southeastern Louisiana University head football coach
- John Stevens (1996) Tennessee State Senator representing District 24
- Pat Summitt (1974) Tennessee Lady Vols head basketball coach, all-time leader for games won among NCAA Division I basketball coaches (men's or women's). The court in the basketball arena and a street on campus are named for Summitt.
- Fred Thomas (1996) New Orleans Saints cornerback
