= The Pacer =

Student newspaper at the University of Tennessee at Martin

- Type: Student newspaper
- School: University of Tennessee at Martin
- Founded: 1928
- Website: thepacer.net

The Pacer, founded in 1928, is the name of the student newspaper of the University of Tennessee at Martin. The Office of Student Publications at UT Martin publishes The Pacer every Tuesday morning throughout the semester except for holidays and exam periods. As of 2006, the newspaper has a circulation of 3,000 copies. Throughout its history, the newspaper has also been named The Checkerboard and The Volette.

== History ==
According to Robert L. Carroll's book, The University of Tennessee at Martin: The First One Hundred Years, the forerunner of UTM was a Baptist school, Hall-Moody Institute, established in 1900. A student newspaper called The Crimson and Gold (the institute's colors) was printed for several years, and two annuals, or yearbooks, also were published. The Crimson and Gold run ended when the institute closed in 1927 because of financial troubles, and all students were given the opportunity to transfer to nearby Union University in Jackson, Tennessee.

The University of Tennessee Junior College opened in the fall 1927, and a student newspaper, The Checkerboard, followed in 1928.

=== The Checkerboard ===
A group of students decided in the fall of 1927 that UTJC needed a student newspaper. They called themselves the Checkers, and the first evidence of their dream, the Checkerboard, appeared in the Weakley County Press in January and February 1928. They also published a standalone issue of the Checkerboard later in the spring of 1928 and then published a magazine by the same name at the end of the 1927–28 academic year. The magazine is also considered a forerunner of the present-day UTM yearbook, The Spirit. Its first Editor was Lloyd Lynn.

The first edition of The Volette, which evolved from the Checkers' vision and grew into the permanent student newspaper at what is now UTM, was printed Dec. 17, 1928. It paid tribute to the Checkers on page 2, for "the spontaneous enthusiasm of this group of students", who "actually published a paper weekly; without money, without anything but the passive approval of the faculty and their own native ability coupled with a boundless determination. ..."

=== The Volette ===
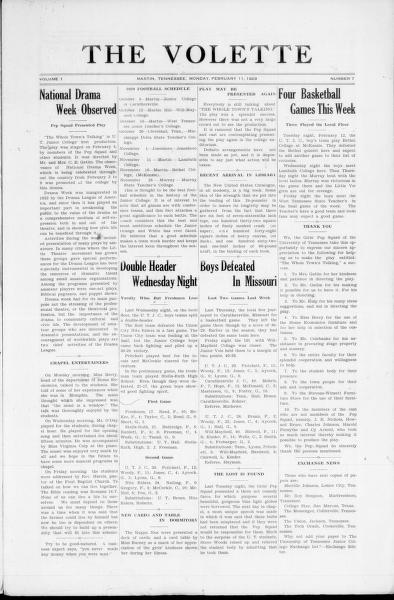
Front page of the February 11, 1929 issue of The Volette. Courtesy of the Tennessee State Library and Archives (Microfilm 912)

The first Volette was a four-page publication that contained a few advertisements but no pictures. Sports news led the way on many of the headlines on Page 1:

- Football team closes successful season
- Prospects good for girls basketball team
- Coach Grantham attends conference at Memphis

Other headlines included:

- Large number make Honor Role
- Faculty members make speeches
- U.T. Student admitted to the Bar

On Page 2 of The Volette were a freshman's letter home (with all spelling and grammatical errors included, perhaps as a joke), newspaper staff information, subscription information (a year's subscription was only $1.50), a brief on the naming contest held to name The Volette and an editorial from the newspaper staff on the first edition of the paper.

The editorial included an apology for why the paper was printed so late in the fall, as well as a plea for stories from the student body that The Pacer continues to make to this day. It reads "... It is evident that no group of reporters, however good they may be, can cover all interesting items without the cooperation of the student body at large. Therefore, we ask that any student will report such interesting occurrence as shall come under his observation. Moreover, we wish to state that it is policy of this paper to accept worthwhile contributions from any and all sources."

A column down the side of the page was called "Newsettes," personal notes of college students. Tidbits from the column include:

- Lucille Kirk and Kennedy Laws went to Fulton Saturday night.
- Charles Johnson attended the Cow Sale at Gleason Saturday
- Marie Wells spent the weekend at her home in Obion.
- Tater Jones and Fatty McDonald have accepted position as skating managers in the skating rink here.
- Paul White spent several days in Nashville, Christmas shopping.
- The Terrible Two were out of the dormitory last weekend.
- John McDonald was the guest of Mr. Matthew Enochs at his home in Newbern.
- Burnie Orr called on Dr. C.R. Galloway of Greenfield Tuesday afternoon to have the lens of his glasses changed. (Orr was the business manager for The Volette.)

While The Pacer no longer contains such personal items on students, local papers like the Weakley County Press and the Dresden Enterprise still feature the same type of "community news."

The Vollette's Page 3 featured a wide variety of opinionated copy titled "El Toro" by El Toreador. No other name was given. El Toreador, however, took up much of the page with "rants" both serious and funny on other students; with a poem called "Ballad of Bad Boys" with a Top 10 list of rules for drivers and with suggestions on what students could do at night. The last suggestion, of course, was to study. The page also featured a story about the Home Economics Club.

Page 4 contained jokes, which shall not be reprinted in this space. Oddly enough, the page also included a brief on all the new students entering UTJC for the second quarter, as well as a short story on the death of a "popular student's" father.

Advertising was confined to Pages 3 and 4, with one plea from the newspaper staff to "patronize our advertisers." The paper even included a few classified ads, one for someone willing to work trig problems and a couple for pressing pants and shining shoes.

Finally, current students should know that maybe a lot hasn't really changed in the past 75 years of education at UTJC/UTMB/UTM. Page 4 also included a column called "Rules and Regulations, of University of Tennessee Junior College (Published by special permission for the benefit of the news students)." Such rules included:

- Chewing gum must be chewed in every class, and, if possible, chewed loud enough to drown out what the professor has to say.
- Whistling, singing and conversations must go on in the library ...
- Every student is requested to be late to chapel ...
- When taking examinations, be sure to sit by good neighbors.
- Do not buy any books, paper or pencils. There should be extravagance in this university, and purchasing these things is not necessary as they may be borrowed.
- Cut as many classes as possible.

=== The Pacer ===
Front page of the October 6, 1971 issue of The Pacer. Courtesy of the Tennessee State Library and Archives (Microfilm 912).

The first edition of The Pacer was printed on Oct. 6, 1971. At that time, UTM's athletics nickname was the Pacers. Though the university's nickname was changed to the Skyhawks in the 1995, then Pacer adviser Dr. Robert Nanney asked the staff to vote whether to again change the newspaper's name to reflect the changing mascot, as was done when it was The Volette.

"By an overwhelming margin, the staff voted to retain the Pacer moniker for two reasons. First, The Pacer reflects an ever-evolving, pace-setting entity, and we believed the newspaper should continue to represent such on campus. Second, the staff believed that retaining the name would make it clear that the newspaper does not necessarily follow the recommendations of consultants," Nanney said in a 2003 interview.

== Volume Numbers ==
The Pacer volume number is counted chronologically from the first issue of The Volette published Dec. 17, 1928, with the coming of a new academic year (measured from August to May) representing a new volume.

Numerous editions of The Pacer bear the incorrect volume number, including the first edition under the masthead in 1971. Because the newspaper was not entirely reestablished when the name was changed from The Volette, the staff saw fit to correct this mistake in later issues.
