= Epsilon Eta Phi =

American business and commerce sorority (1927–1973)

- ΕΗΦ
- Founded: May 3, 1927; 99 years ago Northwestern University
- Type: Professional
- Former affiliation: PPA
- Status: Merged
- Merge date: July 27, 1973
- Successor: Phi Chi Theta
- Emphasis: Women's Commerce
- Scope: National
- Motto: "To be rather than to seem"
- Member badge
- Colors: Steel gray and Old rose
- Flower: Rose-colored Sweet pea
- Publication: Epsilon Eta Phi Magazine
- Chapters: 7
- Members: 900 lifetime
- Headquarters: Chicago, Illinois; United States

Epsilon Eta Phi (ΕΗΦ) was an American professional sorority in the field of business administration and commerce. It was founded in 1927 and merged with Phi Chi Theta in 1973.

== History ==
Epsilon Eta Phi was founded on May 3, 1927, at Northwestern University in Evanston, Illinois. Its founders were Melba Pinckney Allen, Ruth Novak Berger, Evelyn Scheer Carlson, Ruth Erickson Funk, Iona Bloomer Radsch, and Florence Cockerham Turzak. It was incorporated on October 14, 1930, in the state of Illinois.

The fraternity became a member of Professional Panhellenic Association on or before 1953, and was still a member of PPA in 1968. Epsilon had five active chapters and two inactive chapters by 1967. Of the active chapters, it maintained two chapters at Duquesne University, one serving daytime students and the other, for evening students. Its national headquarters were in Chicago, Illinois.

It merged with Phi Chi Theta, a professional fraternity in business administration and economics on July 27, 1973, adopting the larger fraternity's symbolism and markings. One new chapter at Duquesne emerged from the two Epsilon Eta Phi predecessors that same year. The groups at Northwestern combined.

== Symbols ==
The Epsilon Eta Phi motto was "To be rather than to seem". The colors of Epsilon Eta Phi were steel gray and old rose. Its flower was rose-colored sweet pea. Its publication was the Epsilon Eta Phi Magazine.

== Chapters ==
Following is a list of chapters of Epsilon Eta Phi chapters.

Chapter	Charter date and range	Institution	Location	Status	Ref.
Alpha	May 3, 1927 – July 27, 1973	Northwestern University	Evanston, Illinois	Merged (ΦΧΘ)	(Note: Joined Delta chapter of Phi Chi Theta with the national merger of the two organizations.)
Beta	1931 – July 27, 1973	DePaul University	Chicago, Illinois	Merged (ΦΧΘ)	
Gamma	1931–1961	Boston University	Boston, Massachusetts	Inactive	
Delta	1935 – July 27, 1973	Duquesne University (Day)	Pittsburgh, Pennsylvania	Merged (ΦΧΘ)	(Note: Delta and Epsilon combined to form the Gamma Upsilon chapter of Phi Chi Theta with the national merger of the two organizations.)
Epsilon	1947 – July 27, 1973	Duquesne University (Evening)	Pittsburgh, Pennsylvania	Merged (ΦΧΘ)	
Zeta	1954–1965	Beaver College	Glenside, Pennsylvania	Inactive	
Eta	1964 – July 27, 1973	Hardin–Simmons University	Abilene, Texas	Merged (ΦΧΘ)	

== See also ==
- Professional Fraternity Association
