= Harry Ford (actor) =

American actor (born 1987)

- Born: Harrison Miller Ford; December 22, 1987 (age 38); Dyersburg, Tennessee, U.S.
- Other name: Porter Harris
- Education: Southern Methodist University (BFA); New York University (MFA)
- Occupation: Actor
- Years active: 2009–present

Harrison Miller Ford (born December 22, 1987) is an American actor. He starred in the CBS medical drama Code Black as third-year resident Dr. Angus Leighton.

== Life and career ==
Harrison Miller Ford was born in 1987 in Dyersburg, Tennessee. He began his acting career in middle school and attended high school at Memphis University School in Memphis. He received his bachelor's degree in fine arts in theater with an emphasis in acting from Southern Methodist University's Meadows School of the Arts, and a master's degree in fine arts in acting at New York University's Tisch School of the Arts. Currently, Ford resides in Los Angeles and New York City.

== Filmography ==
Year	Title	Role	Notes
2009	Skiptracers	J.D. Trawick	as Porter Harris
2015	Louder Than Bombs	Ralph	Movie
2015	The Grid: Zombie Outlet Maul	Remo, Bar Patron, Sports Reporter	Movie
2015–2018	Code Black	Angus Leighton	47 episodes
2024	Borderlands	Middleman	
