= Laurie Couch =

- Occupations: Academic administrator; psychologist
- Title: Provost and senior vice chancellor for academic affairs, University of Tennessee at Martin

Academic background
- Education: Mississippi State University; University of Tennessee

Academic work
- Discipline: Psychology
- Sub-discipline: Experimental psychology
- Institutions: Fort Hays State University; Morehead State University; Salisbury University; University of Tennessee at Martin

Laurie Couch is a U.S. academic administrator and former professor of psychology serving as provost and senior vice chancellor for academic affairs at University of Tennessee at Martin since 2025. She was previously provost at Salisbury University.

== Life ==
Couch is from Huntsville, Alabama. She completed a bachelor's degree in psychology at Mississippi State University. Couch earned a master's degree and doctorate in experimental psychology from University of Tennessee.

Couch taught at University of Tennessee and Fort Hays State University. In 1997, Couch joined the Morehead State University psychology faculty before becoming the associate provost for undergraduate education and student success in 2016.

On June 30, 2023, Couch joined Salisbury University as its provost and senior vice president of academic affairs.
