= Phi Theta Kappa (professional) =

American commerce sorority (1918–1924)

- ΦΘΚ
- Founded: 1918; 108 years ago University of Denver
- Type: Professional
- Affiliation: Independent
- Status: Merged
- Successor: Phi Chi Theta
- Emphasis: Commerce
- Scope: National
- Colors: Orchid and Gold
- Chapters: 5
- Headquarters: United States

Phi Theta Kappa (ΦΘΚ) was an American professional sorority for students of business administration, commerce, and accounting. It was established in 1918 at the University of Denver in Denver, Colorado and chartered a total of five chapters in the four states. In 1924, Phi Theta Kappa merged with Phi Kappa Epsilon, a similar organization, to form Phi Chi Theta.

== History ==
Phi Theta Kappa was established in 1918 at the University of Denver in Denver, Colorado. It was incorporated in the State of Colorado on March 3, 1919. It was a collegiate professional sorority for business administration, commerce, and accounting. The society's purpose was to promote academic achievement and high professional standards. Its chapters were chartered at institutions that provided three years or more of training in business administration and higher accountancy.

A second chapter, Beta, was chartered in April 1920 at the University of Oregon in Eugene, Oregon, followed by Gamma chapter at Oregon Agricultural College in Corvallis, Oregon in May 1920. Next, it chartered Delta chapter at Northwestern University in Evanston, Illinois. Its Epsilon chapter was established in April 1921 at the University of Pittsburgh in Pittsburgh, Pennsylvania. The sorority held a convention in Denver on July 6 through July 9, 1922.

On June 16 and 17, 1924, three representatives of Phi Theta Kappa and met at the La Salle Hotel in Chicago with three representatives of Phi Kappa Epsilon. Phi Kappa Epsilon was another professional business sorority that was also established in 1918. The meeting resulting in the merger of the two professional sororities, forming Phi Chi Theta.

== Symbols ==
Phi Theta Kappa's badge was crescent shaped and set in pearls, with the Greek letters "ΦΘΚ". Its colors were orchid and gold.

== Membership ==
Members of Phi Theta Kappa were female juniors and seniors who had completed one year of study in commerce or business administration. They were selected based on their scholarship, leadership in student activities, and "qualities of womanhood".

== Chapters ==
Following are the chapters of Phi Theta Kappa.

Chapter	Charter date and range	Institution	Location	Status	Ref.
Alpha	1918 – June 16, 1924	University of Denver	Denver, Colorado	Merged (ΦΧΘ)	(Note: Became the Colorado Alpha chapter of Phi Chi Theta, after the sorority's national merger with Phi Kappa Epsilon.)
Beta	April 13, 1920 – June 16, 1924	University of Oregon	Eugene, Oregon	Merged (ΦΧΘ)	(Note: Chapter formed from the Women's Commerce Club. It the Oregon Beta chapter of Phi Chi Theta, after the sorority's national merger with Phi Kappa Epsilon.)
Gamma	May 8, 1920 – June 16, 1924	Oregon Agricultural College	Corvallis, Oregon	Merged (ΦΧΘ)	(Note: Chapter formed from Phi Kappa (local). It became the Gamma chapter of Phi Chi Theta, after the sorority's national merger with Phi Kappa Epsilon.)
Delta	192x ? – June 16, 1924	Northwestern University	Evanston, Illinois	Merged (ΦΧΘ)	(Note: Became the Delta chapter of Phi Chi Theta, after the sorority's national merger with Phi Kappa Epsilon.)
Epsilon	April 1921 – June 16, 1924	University of Pittsburgh	Pittsburgh, Pennsylvania	Merged (ΦΧΘ)	(Note: Chapter formed from Phi Gamma Sigma (local). It became the Epsilon chapter of Phi Chi Theta, after the sorority's national merger with Phi Kappa Epsilon.)

== See also ==
- Professional fraternities and sororities
