= William C. Rhodes (businessman) =

American businessman

William C. Rhodes III
- Education: University of Tennessee at Martin
- Occupation: Businessman
- Title: Executive Chairman of AutoZone, Inc.

William C. Rhodes III is the Executive Chairman and former President and Chief Executive Officer of AutoZone, Inc.

Rhodes is a graduate of the University of Tennessee at Martin with an accounting degree. He also earned a master of business administration degree from the University of Memphis.

== Education ==
Rhodes graduated from Craigmont High School, Memphis, TN and the University of Tennessee at Martin where he was on the golf team.

== Career ==
=== AutoZone ===
William C. Rhodes III began his career at AutoZone in 1994. Before this, he was a manager at Ernst & Young LLP. He was President and Chief Executive Officer of AutoZone, Inc., a Fortune 300 company. He was named to those positions on March 13, 2005, following more than 12 years with the company where he served in a variety of executive-level roles. In 2007, he was named chairman of the company. In January 2024, Rhodes stepped down as president and CEO of AutoZone and assumed the role of Executive Chairman.

According to annual proxy filings with the United States Securities and Exchange Commission, Rhodes's 2005 compensation from AutoZone totaled over US$8.5M. While CEO of AutoZone in 2009, Rhodes earned a total compensation of $3,052,765, which included a base salary of $752,385, a cash bonus of $1,017,977, stocks granted of $21,270, options granted of $1,138,717, and other compensation totaling $122,416. Business Insider listed him as one of the 25 most underpaid CEOs in 2010. He was among the best-performing CEOs in 2014 and among the highest-paid CEOs in 2016. In 2023, Rhodes's total compensation at AutoZone was $18.8 million, or 705 times what the median employee at AutoZone earned that same year.

== Other work ==
Rhodes is a former board member of Dollar General. He is also a director at the Retail Industry Leaders Association. Tennessee Governor Bill Haslam nominated Rhodes among others to the University of Tennessee's Board of Trustees, who was eventually approved.

Acting as a representative for other CEOs during a meeting between these CEOs, Rhodes, and President Donald Trump, Rhodes expressed concern over whether specific policy shifts would affect "our industry, our employees and American working families." He also expressed concern that tariffs enacted by Trump did not "shock" customers.

Rhodes is politically active and contributes to political races, including the reelection campaign for Governor Charlie Baker of Massachusetts in 2018 and George Flinn in West Tennessee's Eighth District in 2016.
