= Skiptracers =

- Poster
- Directed by: Harris Mendheim
- Written by: Harris Mendheim; Brian J. Saliba; Andy Stuckey
- Starring: Daniel Burnley; Michael H. Cole; Cynthia Evans; Eddie Galey
- Release date: September 11, 2009
- Country: United States
- Language: English

Skiptracers is a 2009 American comedy film directed by Harris Mendheim and starring Daniel Burnley, Michael H. Cole, Cynthia Evans, and Eddie Galey. The film was theatrically released in the US on 11 September 2009.

== See also ==
- Skiptrace
- bounty hunting
