= Raymond James Morgan Keegan =

- Type: Public
- Traded as: NYSE: RJF
- Industry: Investment services
- Headquarters: St. Petersburg, Florida, United States
- Key people: Thomas James (executive chairman); Paul Reilly (CEO); John Carson (president)
- Products: Financial services, securities and insurance brokerage
- Website: www.raymondjames.com

Raymond James Morgan Keegan is the interim name of the former Morgan Keegan & Co. business units acquired by Raymond James Financial on April 2, 2012. The combined firms’ subsidiaries engage primarily in investment and financial planning, investment banking, fixed income products and asset management. The combined firms’ Fixed Income group is located in the former Morgan Keegan corporate headquarters in Memphis, Tennessee.

== History ==
Morgan Keegan was founded in Memphis in 1969 by Allen B. Morgan Jr., James Keegan, Robert Gooch Jr., and accountant Joseph C. Weller. Morgan had been with Courts & Co., Keegan was previously an over-the-counter trader at Equitable Securities, and Gooch had been with Kohlmeyer & Co. John Stokes joined shortly thereafter from Merrill Lynch.

At the end of its first year, the company had 13 employees and $614,000 in capital. In 1970, MK secured a seat on the New York Stock Exchange. Within three years, MK had set up a fixed income division and opened its first branch office. By 1976, MK had established an investment banking division.

The 1980s

In 1983, the company sold shares to the public through an initial public offering. In 1985, the company stock was listed on the NYSE under the ticker symbol "MOR" and corporate revenues exceeded $50 million for the first time. Keegan left the firm in 1985.

In 1985, construction of the new Morgan Keegan Tower in downtown Memphis was completed. At 21 stories and 403 feet tall (including the spire), it is the second-highest building in Memphis. In a nod to the past, the four giant stone griffins that adorned the Hotel King Cotton formerly on the site are displayed in the atrium of the Tower.

Also in 1985, William W. "Bill" Deupree Jr., who joined MK in 1972, became president, a position he held until 1996. Deupree also served as a Director of the Securities Industry Association from 1992 to 1995 and on the Regional Advisory Board of the New York Stock Exchange from 1991 to 1995.

In 1988, bought Jackson, Mississippi-based brokerage Geary & Patterson; in 1989 it bought T.J. Raney & Sons, Arkansas' oldest investment banking firm, George M. Wood & Company in Montgomery, Alabama, and Louisiana investment firm Scharff & Jones.

The 1990s

By 1991, revenues reached US$100 million and stockholders equity was roughly $50 million. In two more years revenues doubled.

In 1992, MK purchased Cumberland Securities of Knoxville. In 1993 it acquired Porter, White & Yardley of Birmingham, Alabama, and Capitol Securities Group of Texas. The next year it bought J. Lee Peeler & Co. of North Carolina and Louisville-based Commonwealth Securities Group. In 1995, MK bought Trust Company of Chattanooga and renamed it Morgan Trust Company, and ARM, a firm founded by Kyle Rote Jr. and employing super agent Jimmy Sexton -- Athletic Resource Management, a Memphis-based sports agency representing players in the National Basketball Association, National Football League and Major League Baseball. In 1997, it purchased Atlanta-based underwriting firm Knox, Wall & Co., and investment manager Weibel, Huffman, Keegan.

The 2000s

During the merger frenzy within regional brokerages of the late 1990s and early 2000s, the firm was sold to Regions Financial Corporation for $789 million. Due to his concentration in Morgan Keegan stock at that time of the merger, Morgan remains the largest non-institutional shareholder of Regions, according to Bloomberg. As such, Morgan joined the Regions board of directors and eventually became vice chairman of Regions. He retired from the board at the end of 2007.

With the merger of Regions complete in 2001, MK folded the former Regions Investment Company into existing operations, bringing the total financial advisor count to roughly 900. In 2002, MK added two more NYSE seats, bringing its total to five. The seats were estimated to be worth $10 million total at the time.

Following the Regions and Union Planters Bank merger in 2004, MK added more than 70 new satellite locations in Union Planters Banks. MK bought Albrecht & Associates in 2005, which helps sell oil and gas properties. In 2007, MK absorbed AmSouth Investment Services, as a result of the Regions and AmSouth Bank merger. As the AmSouth executives (Chmn. Dowd Ritter) began to hold sway, many MK employees became disenchanted with the direction of the parent organization.

In the late 2000s, Morgan Keegan began bolstering its investment banking operations. In June 2007, MK bought Shattuck Hammond Partners. In December 2008, it bought Atlanta-based merger advisory firm Burke Capital and boutique firm Revolution Partners, which specializes in middle-market technology companies. In June 2009, it added strategic acquisition specialists with Spectrum Capital Partners.

In April 2012, Raymond James Financial purchased Morgan Keegan for $930 million. It had 300 offices in 20 states employing a total of 3,100 people. It is headquartered in the Morgan Keegan Tower in downtown Memphis and employs 1,050 people in the city.

== Management ==
The firm's day-to-day operations were run by Allen Morgan, as chairman and CEO, from 1969 until 2003. Morgan remained chairman until his retirement on December 31, 2007.

Bill Deupree was president from 1985 until 1996; after a brief stint by Stephen P. Laffey, G. Douglas "Doug" Edwards became president title.

On February 27, 2008, John C. Carson Jr., was named as the third CEO of Morgan Keegan. Carson had been the head of fixed income, after first managing the MBS desk and then becoming head of fixed income trading. He had joined in the firm in 1994. Upon Carson's elevation, R. Patrick Kruczek became president.

On April 2, 2012, Morgan Keegan & Co was acquired by Raymond James Financial. The transaction created one of the country’s largest full-service wealth management and investment banking firms not headquartered on Wall Street. Upon the acquisition, Carson became president.
