= Esse quam videri =

Latin phrase: "To be rather than to seem"

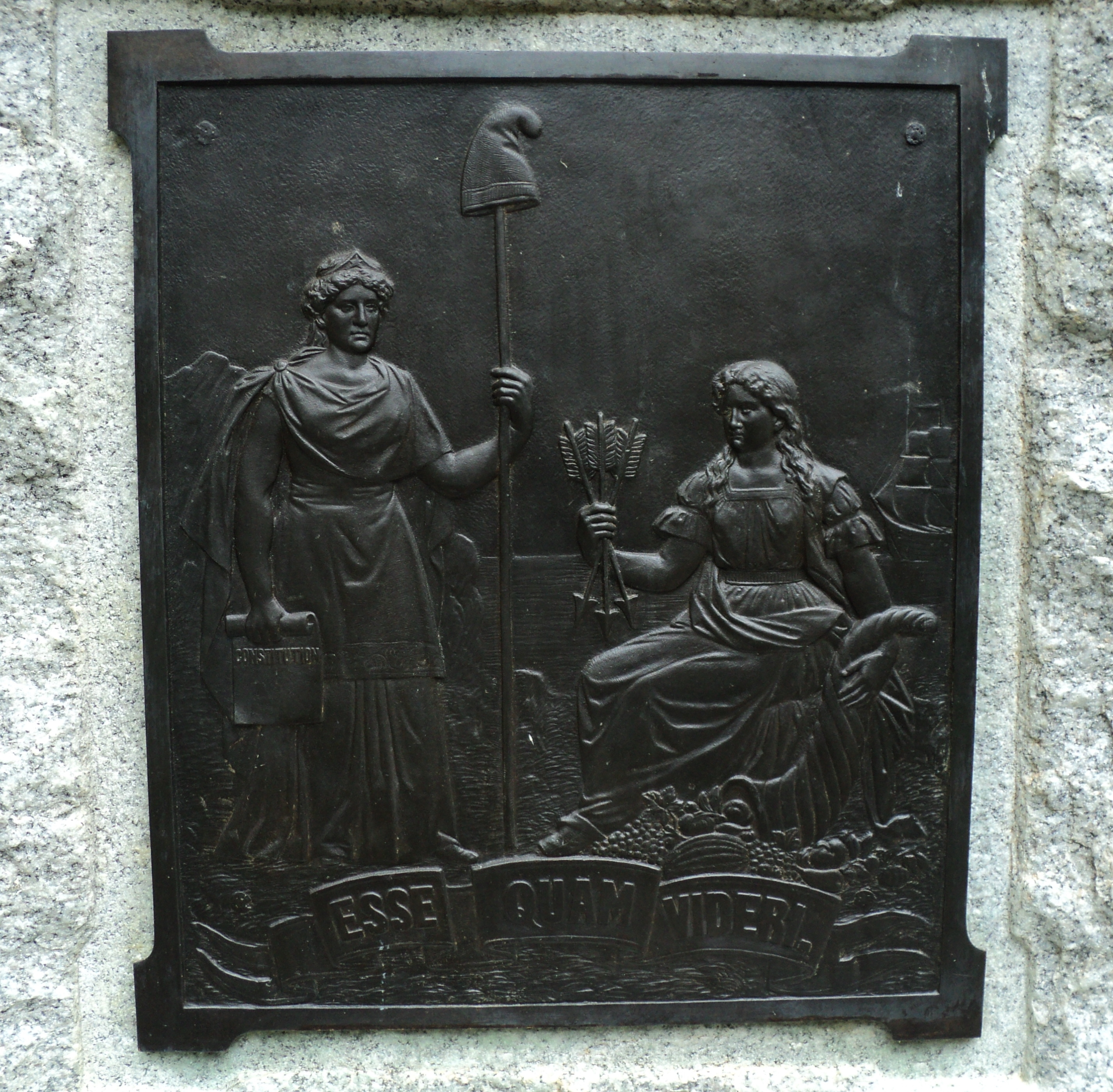
"Esse quam videri" plaque on monument to Revolutionary War officer Joseph Winston, Guilford Courthouse National Military Park, Greensboro, North Carolina

Esse quam videri is a Latin phrase meaning "To be, rather than to seem." It has been used as a motto by a number of different groups.

== History ==
Esse quam videri is found in Cicero's essay On Friendship (Laelius de Amicitia, chapter 98). Virtute enim ipsa non tam multi praediti esse quam videri volunt ("Few are those who wish to be endowed with virtue rather than to seem so").

Just a few years after Cicero, Sallust used the phrase in his Bellum Catilinae (54.6), writing that Cato the Younger esse quam videri bonus malebat ("He preferred to be good rather than to seem so").

Previous to both Romans, Aeschylus used a similar phrase in Seven Against Thebes at line 592, at which the scout (angelos) says of the seer/priest Amphiaraus: οὐ γὰρ δοκεῖν ἄριστος, ἀλλ᾽ εἶναι θέλει (ou gàr dokeîn áristos, all' eînai thélei: "he doesn't want to seem, but to be the bravest"). Plato quoted this line in Republic (361b).

== Usage as a motto ==
=== North Carolina ===
Great Seal of North Carolina with the state motto Esse quam videri.

Esse quam videri is the state motto of North Carolina, adopted in 1893.

=== Schools and colleges ===
Esse quam videri is (or was) the motto of a number of schools and colleges around the world, including:

- Academia de Guerra del Ejército de Chile, Santiago, Chile
- Academy of the Holy Names, Tampa, Florida
- Academy of the Holy Names, Albany, New York
- Academy at the Lakes, Land O Lakes, Florida
- Accra Academy, Accra, Ghana
- Albert Academy, Freetown, Sierra Leone
- Amarillo High School, Amarillo, Texas
- Ashford School, Ashford, Kent, UK
- St Anselm's School, Bakewell, England
- St Audries School, East Quantoxhead, Somerset, England
- Appalachian State University (1899), Boone, North Carolina
- Ashford School (1899), Ashford, Kent, England
- Ashville College (1877), Harrogate, England
- Augusta Preparatory Day School (1972), Augusta, Georgia, US
- Bedford College, University of London until c.1990, when Bedford and Royal Holloway Colleges merged and it became the motto of the joint college
- Berklee College of Music, Boston, Massachusetts, US and Valencia, Spain
- Bordentown Military Institute, (1881-1973), Bordentown, NJ, US
- Boys' Latin School of Maryland (1844), Baltimore, Maryland, US
- Catawba County Sheriff's Office, Newton, North Carolina, US
- Chania High School, Thika, Kenya
- Clifton House School, Harrogate, England.
- Colyton Grammar School (1546), Colyford, England
- Columbia College Chicago (1890), Chicago, Illinois, US
- Connells Point Public School, Sydney, Australia
- Cranbrook School, Sydney (1918), Sydney, Australia
- Darwin High School, Darwin, Australia
- Desert Heights Preparatory Academy, Glendale, Arizona
- Dubbo High School (now Dubbo College)
- Ellis Robins High School, Harare, Zimbabwe
- The Ellis School, Pittsburgh, Pennsylvania, US
- The Episcopal Academy, Newtown Square, Pennsylvania, US
- Esquimalt High School, Esquimalt, British Columbia
- The Forest School, Winnersh, Wokingham, Berkshire, England
- Garrison Forest School, Owings Mills, Maryland, US
- Groton School (1884), Groton, Massachusetts, US. The motto changed to Cui Servire est Regnare ("To whom to serve is to reign") shortly after the school's founding.
- Hartford Public High School, Hartford, Connecticut, US
- The Hemel Hempstead School (1931), Hemel Hempstead, England.
- The Hermitage School (1906), Geelong, Australia; which has subsequently become that of The Hermitage House, Geelong Grammar School.
- Highsted Grammar School, Sittingbourne, Kent, England
- Homewood School, Tenterden, Kent, England
- Hudson Catholic High School, Hudson, Massachusetts
- Instituto Metodista Bennett (1888), Rio de Janeiro, Brazil
- JMA Armstrong High School, Salisbury, New Brunswick, Canada
- John Caldwell School, Grand Falls, New Brunswick, Canada
- The King's College, New York (House of Susan B. Anthony)
- Kingsley School, Leamington Spa, Warwickshire, England
- Kutama College, Norton, Zimbabwe
- Lane College, Jackson, Tennessee, US
- Magee Secondary School, Vancouver, British Columbia
- Miami Coral Park Senior High School, Miami, Florida, US
- Montego Bay High School for Girls, Jamaica
- Montreat College, Montreat, North Carolina
- Moravian Academy, Bethlehem, Pennsylvania; current motto is "mind, body, spirit",
- Mountlake Terrace High School, Mountlake Terrace, Washington
- National University of Health Sciences (previously National Chiropractic College), Lombard, Illinois
- Peace College (1857), Raleigh, North Carolina, US
- Providence Christian Academy, Murfreesboro, Tennessee
- Queen's College, Queenstown, South Africa
- Regent's University London, England
- Rhodesway School (1958), Bradford, UK
- Rockridge Secondary School, West Vancouver, British Columbia
- Royal Holloway, University of London, Egham, Surrey, England
- RS Central High School, Rutherfordton, NC
- Saintbridge School for Boys, Gloucester, England
- Salisbury School, Salisbury, Connecticut, US
- Selaiyur Hall, Madras Christian College, Chennai, India
- Seton Hall High School, Patchogue, New York, United States
- Southampton Grammar School for Girls Southampton, UK
- St Audries School, West Quantoxhead, Taunton, Somerset, England (since closed and now a hotel)
- St Francis Xaviers Kutama College (1914), Norton, Zimbabwe
- St Thomas à Becket Catholic Secondary School, Wakefield, West Yorkshire, United Kingdom
- St. Joseph's College in Patchogue, New York, United States.
- St. Malachy's Memorial High School, Saint John, New Brunswick, Canada.
- St. Peter's School, Mazgaon, Mumbai, India
- Stanley Clark School, South Bend, Indiana, US
- Streetsville Secondary School, Streetsville, Mississauga, Ontario, Canada
- Suffield Academy, Suffield, Connecticut, US
- The Taieri High School, Mosgiel, Otago, New Zealand
- Thomas Jefferson Classical Academy (1999–present), Rutherford County, North Carolina
- Trevecca Nazarene University, Nashville, Tennessee
- Truro School (1880–present), Truro, Cornwall, England
- University of North Carolina at Charlotte (1946), Charlotte, North Carolina, US
- University of Tampa, Tampa, Florida
- Villa Devoto School (1908), Buenos Aires, Argentina
- Wavell State High School, Brisbane, Australia
- Woodward Career Technical High School (formerly Woodward High School), Cincinnati, Ohio, US
- Wyomissing Area Junior/Senior High School, Wyomissing, Pennsylvania
- Yeovil School, Yeovil, Somerset, England
- Froebel House Preparatory School, Hull, England.

=== Sororities ===
Esse quam videri is the motto of the following sororities:

- Delta Phi Epsilon sorority, founded in 1917 at New York University Law School.
- House of Susan B. Anthony, founded exclusively at The King's College NYC.
- Phi Delta Alpha, founded in 2002 at University of Oklahoma
- Alpha Chi Lambda, founded in 1998 at Trinity University in San Antonio, TX.

=== Fraternities ===
Esse quam videri is the motto of the following fraternities:

- Phi Gamma Nu, National Professional Fraternity in Business, est. Northwestern University 1924.
- Lambda Kappa Sigma, founded in 1913 at Massachusetts College of Pharmacy.
- Phi Beta fraternity, National Professional Association for the Creative and Performing Arts, founded in 1912 at Northwestern University.
- Gamma Eta Gamma, founded in 1901 at the University of Maine School of Law. The only remaining chapter exists at the University of Minnesota Law School.

=== Families ===
The Wallenberg family.

=== Sporting organisations ===
- Kingswood Rugby Football Club, Bristol, UK, use a variant Esse Non Videri as their club motto.
- White Wolves MC, Oradea, RO, use a variant of the motto, Esse Quam Videri Malim as their club motto.
- Outcast Cyclists, U.K. and worldwide use Esse Quam Videri as their club motto.

=== Companies ===
- Brepols Publishers, as found on their older books: Melius esse quam videri
- Swire Group esp. its shipping branch, The China Navigation Company.
- The phrase is found on the Sibley Mill along the Augusta Canal in Augusta, Georgia. The structure was completed in 1882 and operated until 2006.
- The phrase is found on the bottom of bottles of gin and from September 2023 on bottles of Hearach whisky from the Isle of Harris, Scotland.

=== Other organizations ===
Esse quam videri is also the motto of

- the honor society The Order of Scroll and Key at Dickinson College.
- The honor society The Society of 1910 at The University of Southern Mississippi
- The Archon Society at Kenyon College.
- The National Honor & Merit Scholars Society.
- Boy Scouts of America Troop 56 in Jersey City New Jersey
- the Carolina Wilderness EMS Externship, a wilderness EMS training program based in western North Carolina.
- the Brigham Young University Men's Chorus.
- No. 77 Squadron RAF (active during three periods between 1916 and 1963) used the variant, Esse potius quam videri with the same meaning.
- The U. S. Consortium of Metropolitan Medical Directors (Eagles).
- The Pan Hellenic Society of Silliman University, Philippines.
- The Granite Mountain Hotshots, a hotshot crew from Prescott, Arizona who perished battling the Yarnell Hill Fire in 2013. It lives on as the motto of the Eric Marsh Foundation for Wildland Firefighters.
- Royal Charter
- Knights Somerset, Kentucky
- Koinonia Community Church, 3600 McRand Street, Richmond, VA

=== Popular culture ===
Television personality Stephen Colbert inverted the statement on his show The Colbert Report to Videri Quam Esse, meaning "to seem to be rather than to be." It is also engraved across the faux hearth, above the video fireplace, in his studio, under his portrait. He has cited it as his personal motto.
