= List of Phi Gamma Nu chapters =

Phi Gamma Nu is a co-ed collegiate business fraternity. In the following list of chapters, active chapters are indicated in bold and inactive chapters are in italics.

| Chapter | Charter date and range | Institution | Location | Status | Ref. |
|---|---|---|---|---|---|
| **Alpha** | February 17, 1924 – xxxx ?; 20xx ? | Northwestern University | Chicago, Illinois | Active | (Note: Founded at the Chicago branch of Northwestern University, not the Evanston campus.) |
| Beta | October 1927–xxxx ? | Boston University | Boston, Massachusetts | Inactive | (Note: From Sigma Mu Alpha) |
| Gamma | May 1928–xxxx ? | University of Denver | Denver, Colorado | Inactive | (Note: From Gamma Theta) |
| **Delta** | May 1928 | University of Iowa | Iowa City, Iowa | Active | |
| Epsilon | May 17, 1929 | Temple University | Philadelphia, Pennsylvania | Inactive | |
| Zeta | 1931–xxxx ? | University of Detroit Mercy | Detroit, Michigan | Inactive | (Note: This school was named the University of Detroit at the time of Zeta chapter's formation. The school merged with Mercy College of Detroit in 1990.) |
| Eta | February 7, 1931 – xxxx ? | College of Commerce, DePaul University | Chicago, Illinois | Inactive | (Note: From Zeta Alpha) |
| Theta | May 1931–xxxx ? | University of Wyoming | Laramie, Wyoming | Inactive | (Note: From Zeta Nu) |
| Iota | December 1944–xxxx ? | Baylor University | Waco, Texas | Inactive | (Note: From Beta Sigma Chi) |
| Kappa | 1946–xxxx ? | Limestone College | Gaffney, South Carolina | Inactive | |
| Lambda | 1949–xxxx ? | Texas Tech University | Lubbock, Texas | Inactive | |
| Mu | 1949–xxxx ? | University of New Mexico | Albuquerque, New Mexico | Inactive | |
| Nu | May 1949–xxxx ? | Wayne State University | Detroit, Michigan | Inactive | (Note: From Pi Gamma) |
| Xi | May 1950–xxxx ? | University of Mississippi | Oxford, Mississippi | Inactive | |
| **Omicron** | May 1950 | Michigan State University | East Lansing, Michigan | Active | |
| Pi | 1950–xxxx ? | University of Arkansas | Fayetteville, Arkansas | Inactive | |
| Rho | 1951–xxxx ? | Kent State University | Kent, Ohio | Inactive | |
| Sigma | 1951–xxxx ? | University of Memphis | Memphis, Tennessee | Inactive | |
| Tau | November 1953–xxxx ? | Western Texas College | Canyon, Texas | Inactive | |
| Upsilon | January 1954–xxxx ? | Drake University | Des Moines, Iowa | Inactive | (Note: From Sigma Epsilon Delta) |
| Phi | December 1954–xxxx ? | University of Texas at El Paso | El Paso, Texas | Inactive | |
| Chi | 1961–xxxx ? | Eastern New Mexico University | Portales, New Mexico | Inactive | |
| Psi | 1961–xxxx ? | West Liberty State College | West Liberty, West Virginia | Inactive | |
| Omega | 1962–xxxx ? | Canisius College | Buffalo, New York | Inactive | |
| Alpha Alpha | 1963–xxxx ? | Saint Mary-of-the-Woods College | Saint Mary-of-the-Woods, Indiana | Inactive | |
| Alpha Beta | 1963–xxxx ? | Dyke College | Cleveland, Ohio | Inactive | |
| Alpha Gamma | 1966–xxxx ? | Creighton University | Omaha, Nebraska | Inactive | |
| Alpha Delta | May 1966–xxxx ? | Upsala College | East Orange, New Jersey | Inactive | |
| Alpha Epsilon | March 1966–xxxx ? | Temple University | Ambler, Pennsylvania | Inactive | |
| Alpha Zeta | 1967–xxxx ? | Adrian College | Adrian, Michigan | Inactive | |
| Alpha Eta | 1967–xxxx ? | Adrian College | Adrian, Michigan | Inactive ? | |
| Alpha Theta | 1967–xxxx ? | Eastern Michigan University | Ypsilanti, Michigan | Inactive | |
| Alpha Iota | 1967–xxxx ? | Central State University | Wilberforce, Ohio | Inactive ? | |
| Alpha Kappa | May 1967–xxxx ? | Southeast Missouri State College | Cape Girardeau, Missouri | Inactive | |
| Alpha Lambda | May 1967–xxxx ? | Rochester Institute of Technology | Rochester, New York | Inactive | |
| Alpha Mu | | | | Unassigned | |
| Alpha Nu | June 1967–xxxx ? | Ferris State College | Big Rapids, Michigan | Inactive | |
| Alpha Xi | November 1967–xxxx ? | University of Nevada, Las Vegas | Las Vegas, Nevada | Inactive | |
| Alpha Omicron | January 1968–xxxx ? | Southern Illinois University Carbondale | Carbondale, Illinois | Inactive | |
| Alpha Pi | February 1968–xxxx ? | Florida Atlantic University | Boca Raton, Florida | Inactive | |
| Alpha Rho | 1968–xxxx ? | Tennessee Tech | Cookeville, Tennessee | Inactive | |
| Alpha Sigma | 1968–xxxx ? | Drexel Institute of Technology | Philadelphia, Pennsylvania | Inactive | |
| Alpha Tau | 1968–xxxx ? | Roosevelt University | Chicago, Illinois | Inactive | |
| Alpha Upsilon | 1969–xxxx ? | Western Illinois University | Macomb, Illinois | Inactive | |
| Alpha Phi | 1969–xxxx ? | University of Dayton | Dayton, Ohio | Inactive | |
| Alpha Chi | 1969–xxxx ? | Xavier University | New Orleans, Louisiana | Inactive | |
| Alpha Psi | June 1969–20xx ? | Ohio University | Athens, Ohio | Inactive | |
| Alpha Omega | August 1969–xxxx ? | Texas A&M University–Kingsville | Kingsville, Texas | Inactive | |
| Beta Alpha | December 1971–xxxx ? | New Mexico State University | Las Cruces, New Mexico | Inactive | (Note: From Alpha Sigma Iota) |
| Beta Beta | February 1972–xxxx ? | Shepherd College | Shepherdstown, West Virginia | Inactive | |
| Beta Gamma | February 1972–xxxx ? | University of Tampa | Tampa, Florida | Inactive | |
| Beta Delta | April 1972–20xx ? | Dillard University | New Orleans, Louisiana | Inactive | |
| Beta Epsilon | 1973–xxxx ? | University of Houston | Houston, Texas | Inactive | |
| Beta Zeta | 1973–xxxx ? | University of Wisconsin–La Crosse | La Crosse, Wisconsin | Inactive | |
| Beta Eta | 1973–xxxx ? | University of Michigan–Dearborn | Dearborn, Michigan | Inactive | |
| Beta Theta | 1974–xxxx ? | State University of New York at Albany, | Albany, New York | Inactive | |
| Beta Iota | 1974–20xx ? | Troy University | Troy, Alabama | Inactive | |
| Beta Kappa | March 1974–20xx ? | Ball State University | Muncie, Indiana | Inactive | |
| Beta Lambda | April 1974–xxxx ? | University of Texas at Arlington | Arlington, Texas | Inactive | |
| Beta Mu | | | | Unassigned | |
| Beta Nu | May 1974–xxxx ? | Weber State College | Ogden, Utah | Inactive | |
| Beta Xi | 1974–xxxx ? | American International College | Springfield, Massachusetts | Inactive | |
| Beta Omicron | 1974–xxxx ? | Lewis University | Lockport, Illinois | Inactive | |
| **Beta Pi** | 1974 | University of Illinois Urbana-Champaign | Champaign, Illinois | Active | |
| Beta Rho | January 1975–xxxx ? | La Salle University | Philadelphia, Pennsylvania | Inactive | |
| Beta Sigma | 1975–xxxx ? | University of Oklahoma | Norman, Oklahoma | Inactive | |
| Beta Tau | 1975–xxxx ? | Delaware State College | Dover, Delaware | Inactive | |
| Beta Upsilon | 1975–xxxx ? | California State University, Sacramento | Sacramento, California | Inactive | |
| Beta Phi | 1975–xxxx ? | Niagara Community College | Niagara, New York | Inactive | |
| Beta Chi | 1975–xxxx ? | Illinois Wesleyan University | Bloomington, Illinois | Inactive | |
| Beta Psi | 1976–xxxx ? | St. Frances College | Brooklyn, New York | Inactive | |
| Beta Omega | 1976–xxxx ? | University of the District of Columbia | Washington, D.C. | Inactive | |
| Gamma Alpha | | | | Inactive ? | |
| Gamma Beta | 1976–xxxx ? | St. Mary's College | Winona, Minnesota | Inactive | |
| Gamma Gamma | 1976–xxxx ? | Eastern Illinois University | Charleston, Illinois | Inactive | |
| Gamma Delta | 1977–xxxx ? | Clemson University | Clemson, South Carolina | Inactive | |
| Gamma Epsilon | 1977–xxxx ? | Tennessee State University | Nashville, Tennessee | Inactive | |
| Gamma Zeta | 1977–xxxx ? | University of Wisconsin–Whitewater | Whitewater, Wisconsin | Inactive | |
| Gamma Eta | 1977–xxxx ? | Alabama State University | Montgomery, Alabama | Inactive | |
| Gamma Theta | 1977–xxxx ? | Michigan Technological University. | Houghton, Michigan | Inactive | |
| Gamma Iota | 1978–xxxx ? | Jackson State University | Jackson, Mississippi | Inactive | |
| Gamma Kappa | 1978–xxxx ? | Villanova University | Villanova, Pennsylvania | Inactive | |
| Gamma Lambda | 1978–xxxx ? | St. Mary's Dominican College | New Orleans, Louisiana | Inactive | |
| Gamma Mu | 1978–xxxx ? | University of Scranton | Scranton, Pennsylvania | Inactive | |
| Gamma Nu | 1980–xxxx ? | George Mason University | Fairfax, Virginia | Inactive | |
| **Gamma Xi** | 1979 | Indiana University of Pennsylvania | Indiana County, Pennsylvania | Active | |
| Gamma Omicron | 1979–xxxx ? | Spelman College | Atlanta, Georgia | Inactive | |
| Gamma Pi | 1979–xxxx ? | Arizona State University | Tempe, Arizona | Inactive | |
| Gamma Rho | 1979–xxxx ? | Stephens College | Columbia, Missouri | Inactive | |
| Gamma Sigma | 1980–xxxx ? | Newberry College | Newberry, South Carolina | Inactive | |
| Gamma Tau | 1980–xxxx ? | Mount St. Mary's College | Los Angeles, California | Inactive | |
| Gamma Upsilon | 1980–xxxx ? | Illinois Benedictine College | Lisle, Illinois | Inactive | |
| Gamma Phi | | | | Inactive ? | |
| Gamma Chi | 1980–xxxx ? | Angelo State University | San Angelo, Texas | Inactive | |
| Gamma Psi | 1980–xxxx ? | Trinity College of Vermont | Burlington, Vermont | Inactive | |
| Gama Omega | 1981–xxxx ? | Chatham College | Pittsburgh, Pennsylvania | Inactive | |
| Delta Alpha | | | | Inactive ? | |
| Delta Beta | | | | Inactive ? | |
| Delta Gamma | | | | Inactive ? | |
| Delta Epsilon | 1983–xxxx ? | Wesleyan College | Macon, Georgia | Inactive | |
| Delta Zeta | 1983–xxxx ? | Wilkes University | Wilkes-Barre, Pennsylvania | Inactive | |
| Delta Eta | 1985–xxxx ? | College of Notre Dame of Maryland | Baltimore, Maryland | Inactive | |
| **Delta Theta** | 1987 | Pennsylvania State University | University Park, Pennsylvania | Active | |
| Delta Iota | | | | Inactive ? | |
| Delta Kappa | | | | Inactive ? | |
| **Delta Lambda** | September 2003 | University of Pennsylvania | Philadelphia, Pennsylvania | Active | |
| Delta Mu | 200x ?–20xx ? | Drexel University | Philadelphia, Pennsylvania | Inactive | |
| Delta Nu | 200x ?–20xx ? | University of Texas at San Antonio | San Antonio, Texas | Inactive | |
| Delta Xi | 200x ?–20xx ? | University of California, Los Angeles | Los Angeles, California | Inactive | |
| **Delta Omicron** | 2007 | Cornell University | Ithaca, New York | Active | |
| Delta Pi | 2008–20xx ? | Portland State University | Portland, Oregon | Inactive | |
| Delta Rho | | | | | |
| **Delta Sigma** | 2022 | Miami University | Oxford, Ohio | Active | |
| Delta Tau | | | | | |
| **Delta Upsilon** | December 2012 | Washington University in St. Louis | St. Louis County, Missouri | Active | |
| **Delta Phi** | 2014 | University of Michigan | Ann Arbor, Michigan | Active | |
| **Delta Chi** | | Illinois State University | Normal, Illinois | Active | |
| **Delta Psi** | 2014 | Indiana University Bloomington | Bloomington, Indiana | Active | |
| **Delta Omega** | 2015 | University of Pittsburgh | Pittsburgh, Pennsylvania | Active | |
| Epsilon Alpha | | | | Inactive ? | |
| **Epsilon Beta** | 2017 | University of Texas at Austin | Austin, Texas | Active | |
| **Epsilon Gamma** | 2018 | Ohio State University | Columbus, Ohio | Active | |
| Epsilon Delta | | | | Inactive ? | |
| Epsilon Epsilon | | | | Inactive ? | |
| **Epsilon Zeta** | | Babson College | Wellesley, Massachusetts | Active | |
| Epsilon Eta | | | | Inactive ? | |
| **Epsilon Theta** | 2019 | University of Wisconsin–Madison | Madison, Wisconsin | Active | |
| **Epsilon Iota** | 2020 | James Madison University | Harrisonburg, Virginia | Active | |
| Epsilon Kappa | | | | Inactive ? | |
| **Epsilon Lambda** | 202x ? | Columbia University | New York City, New York | Active | |
