= List of Alpha Kappa Kappa chapters =

Alpha Kappa Kappa was a North American medical school fraternity. It was founded in 1888 at Dartmouth Medical School in Hanover, New Hampshire. The fraternity had over sixty chapters at various medical schools throughout the United States and Canada for approximately eighty years before going defunct in the 1960s. Three of its former chapters continued to operate as location organizations after the fraternity's dissolution; two are still active as of 2025.

Following is a list of Alpha Kappa Kappa chapters in Greek letter order. In the early days, chapters chose their letters, so in a few cases, date order does not always match Greek letter alphabetization. Active chapters are indicated in bold and inactive chapters and institutions are in italics.

Chapter	Charter date and range	Institution	Location	Status	Ref.
Alpha	September 29, 1888 – 19xx ?	Dartmouth College	Hanover, New Hampshire	Inactive	
Beta	May 19, 1899 – 1918	College of Physicians and Surgeons	San Francisco, California	Inactive	(Note: Chapter went dormant when the college closed in 1918.)
Gamma	December 12, 1893 – 19xx ?	Tufts University School of Medicine	Boston, Massachusetts	Inactive	
Delta	May 2, 1894 – 19xx ?	Medical Department, University of Vermont	Burlington, Vermont	Inactive	(Note: Chapter formed from Alpha Delta Sigma (local).)
Epsilon	January 6, 1900 – 196x ?	Jefferson Medical College	Philadelphia, Pennsylvania	Withdrew (local)	(Note: At the time of dissolution, this chapter withdrew and continues to operate as a local fraternity.)
Zeta	March 21, 1896 – 19xx ?	Long Island College Hospital Medical School	Brooklyn, New York	Inactive	
Eta	December 7, 1899 – 19xx ?	University of Illinois College of Medicine	Chicago, Illinois	Inactive	
Theta	June 1, 1897 – June 1921	Maine Medical School, Bowdoin College	Brunswick, Maine	Inactive	(Note: Chapter went defunct when the medical school closed in June 1921.)
Iota	December 11, 1899 – 19xx ?	Medical Department University of Syracuse	Syracuse, New York	Inactive	
Kappa.	November 15, 1900 – 19xx ?	Medical Department, Marquette University	Milwaukee, Wisconsin	Inactive	
Lambda	March 7, 1901 – 19xx ?	Medical Department, Cornell University	New York City, New York	Inactive	
Mu	March 30, 1901 – 19xx ?	Medical Department, University of Pennsylvania	Philadelphia, Pennsylvania	Inactive	
Nu	April 27, 1901 – 19xx ?	Rush Medical College	Chicago, Illinois	Inactive	
Xi	May 29, 1901 – 19xx ?	Medical Department, Northwestern University	Chicago, Illinois	Inactive	
Omicron	October 28, 1901 – 19xx ?	Miami Medical College	Cincinnati, Ohio	Inactive	(Note: Miami Medical College consolidated with and adopted the name of the Medical Department of the University of Cincinnati.)
Pi	October 2, 1902 – 19xx ?	Ohio Medical University	Columbus, Ohio	Inactive	(Note: The Ohio Medical University became the Starling-Ohio Medical University in 1907.)
Rho	January 6, 1903 – 19xx ?	University of Colorado Denver	Denver, Colorado	Inactive	
Sigma	December 6, 1899 – 19xx ?	University of California Medical Department	San Francisco, California	Inactive	
Tau	July 15, 1903 – 1903	University of the South Medical School	Sewanee, Tennessee	Inactive	(Note: Chapter went defunct when Sewanee's Medical School was discontinued in 1903)
Upsilon	March 21, 1903 – 19xx ?	Medical Department, University of Oregon	Portland, Oregon	Inactive	
Phi	March 24, 1903 –1909	Medical Department, University of Nashville	Nashville, Tennessee	Inactive	(Note: Chapter went defunct when the medical school closed in 1903.)
Chi	March 24, 1903 – 19xx ?	Vanderbilt University School of Medicine	Nashville, Tennessee	Inactive	
Psi	February 25, 1898 – 19xx ?	University of Minnesota Medical School	Minneapolis, Minnesota	Inactive	(Note: Chapter formed from Alpha Rho Society (local). After the dissolution of the national fraternity, this chapter was closed. Its real estate assets were sold and a foundation was established, forming a perpetual fund to award scholarships through the Minnesota Medical Foundation.)
Omega	March 24, 1903 – 19xx ?	University of Tennessee College of Medicine	Nashville, Tennessee	Inactive	
Alpha Alpha				Unassigned	
Alpha Beta	November 24, 1903 – 19xx ?	Tulane University School of Medicine	New Orleans, Louisiana	Inactive	
Alpha Gamma	January 25, 1904 – 19xx ?	Medical Department, University of Georgia	Augusta, Georgia	Inactive	
Alpha Delta	November 24, 1904 – 19xx ?	McGill University Faculty of Medicine	Montreal, Canada	Inactive	
Alpha Epsilon	April 6, 1905 – 19xx ?	University of Toronto Faculty of Medicine	Toronto, Canada	Inactive	
Alpha Zeta	April 27, 1905 – 19xx ?	George Washington University School of Medicine	Washington, D.C.	Inactive	
Alpha Eta	January 31, 1906 – 19xx ?	Yale School of Medicine	New Haven, Connecticut	Inactive	
Alpha Theta	April 20, 1906 – 196x ?	University of Texas Medical Branch	Galveston, Texas	Withdrew (local)	(Note: Withdrew at the time of dissolution and operated as a local fraternity until the 2000s.)
Alpha Iota	June 4, 1906 – 19xx ?	University of Michigan, Department of Medicine and Surgery	Ann Arbor, Michigan	Inactive	
Alpha Kappa	November 12, 1906 – 19xx ?	Medical College of Virginia	Richmond, Virginia	Inactive	
Alpha Lambda	January 4, 1908 – 1908	Medical College of the State of South Carolina	Charleston, South Carolina	Inactive	(Note: Chapter was withdrawn because of South Carolina law.)
Alpha Mu	March 27, 1909 – 19xx ?	St. Louis University School of Medicine	St. Louis, Missouri	Inactive	
Alpha Nu	June 5, 1909 – 19xx ?	University of Louisville School of Medicine	Louisville, Kentucky	Inactive	
Alpha Xi	November 16, 1909 – 19xx ?	Case Western Reserve University School of Medicine	Louisville, Kentucky	Inactive	
Alpha Omicron	April 15, 1911 – 1913	University Medical College	Kansas City, Missouri	Inactive	(Note: Chapter went defunct when the school closed in 1913.)
Alpha Pi	April 28, 1911 – 19xx ?	University of Pittsburgh School of Medicine	Pittsburgh, Pennsylvania	Inactive	
Alpha Rho	May 27, 1912 – 19xx ?	Harvard Medical School	Boston, Massachusetts	Inactive	
Alpha Sigma	April 15, 1913 – June 1920	University of Southern California Medical School	Los Angeles, California	Inactive	(Note: Chapter went dormant when the medical school closed.)
Alpha Tau	April 24, 1914 – 19xx ?	Atlanta Medical College	Atlanta, Georgia	Inactive	
Alpha Upsilon	March 2, 1917 – 19xx ?	Johns Hopkins School of Medicine	Baltimore, Maryland,	Inactive	
Alpha Phi	March 21, 1917 – 19xx ?	University of Missouri School of Medicine	Columbia, Missouri	Inactive	
Alpha Chi	October 1, 1920 – 19xx ?	University of Oklahoma College of Medicine	Norman, Oklahoma	Inactive	(Note: Chapter formed from Beta Alpha (local), established as Les Bones Pares in the fall of 1919. It petitioned to join Alpha Kappa Kappa on May 5, 1920.)
Alpha Psi	1921–196x ?	Roy J. and Lucille A. Carver College of Medicine	Iowa City, Iowa	Withdrew (local)	(Note: The chapter withdrew at the time of dissolution, becoming the Alpha Kappa Kappa Society(local), now a coed residential community.)
Alpha Omega				Unassigned ?	
Beta Alpha				Unassigned ?	
Beta Gamma	1921–19xx ?	University of Nebraska Medical Center	Omaha, Nebraska	Inactive	
Beta Delta	January 20, 1922 – 19xx ?	University of Virginia School of Medicine	Charlottesville, Virginia	Inactive	
Beta Epsilon	1922–19xx ?	Boston University School of Medicine	Boston, Massachusetts	Inactive	
Beta Zeta	June 10, 1922 – 19xx ?	University of Wisconsin School of Medicine and Public Health	Madison, Wisconsin	Inactive	(Note: Chapter formed from Gamma Tau Beta, a local medical organization, when the University of Wisconsin started its four-year medical college.)
Beta Eta	1923–19xx ?	University of Maryland School of Medicine	Baltimore, Maryland	Inactive	
Beta Theta	1923–19xx ?	Washington University School of Medicine	St. Louis, Missouri	Inactive	
Beta Iota	1923–19xx ?	UNC School of Medicine	Chapel Hill, North Carolina	Inactive	
Beta Kappa	April 15, 1924 – 19xx ?	Schulich School of Medicine & Dentistry	London, Ontario, Canada	Inactive	
Beta Lambda	1925–19xx ?	Columbia University College of Physicians and Surgeons	Washington Heights, Manhattan, New York	Inactive	
Beta Mu	1928–19xx ?	Georgetown University School of Medicine	Washington, D.C.	Inactive	
Beta Nu	October 24, 1931 – 19xx ?	Duke University School of Medicine	Durham, North Carolina	Inactive	
Beta Xi	1932–19xx ?	Stanford University School of Medicine	Stanford, California	Inactive	
Beta Omicron	May 7, 1932 – 19xx ?	Temple University School of Medicine	Philadelphia, Pennsylvania	Inactive	
Beta Pi	1934–19xx ?	Louisiana State University School of Medicine	New Orleans, Louisiana	Inactive	
Beta Rho	1937–19xx ?	New York Medical College	Valhalla, New York	Inactive	
Beta Sigma	May 17, 1947 – 19xx ?	University of Mississippi School of Medicine	Jackson, Mississippi	Inactive	
Beta Tau	1947–19xx ?	University of Washington School of Medicine	Seattle, Washington	Inactive	
Beta Upsilon	January 17, 1948 – 19xx ?	Baylor College of Medicine	Houston, Texas	Inactive	
Beta Phi	May 15, 1948 – 19xx ?	Hahnemann Medical College	East Falls, Philadelphia, Pennsylvania	Inactive	(Note: Chapter formed from Alpha Sigma (local).)
Beta Chi	1953–19xx ?	Miller School of Medicine	Miami, Florida	Inactive	
