= Delta Epsilon Mu =

American professional fraternity for health fields

- ΔΕΜ
- Founded: May 3, 1996; 30 years ago Binghamton University
- Type: Professional
- Affiliation: PFA
- Status: Active
- Emphasis: Pre-Health
- Scope: National
- Motto: "Helping People, Together"
- Pillars: Loyalty, Dedication, Friendship, Support
- Colors: Crimson White, and Black
- Philanthropy: DrEaM Network
- Chapters: 34 active, 9 inactive
- Members: 2,000+ active 5,000+ lifetime
- Headquarters: 1765 Duke Street; Alexandria, Virginia 22314; United States
- Website: www.demnational.org

Delta Epsilon Mu, Incorporated (ΔΕΜ) is an American professional fraternity for students and professionals in clinical or applied practice with interests or focus in pre-health or health-related fields. It was established at Binghamton University in 1996.

== History ==
In the fall of 1995, Binghamton University students Marianna Strakhan, Teri Broklawski, Debbie Amste, and Ellen Hoffman began planning a pre-health fraternity to unite students interested in entering various pre-health professions on campus. Broklawski recruited Sherine Banton, Wendy Cooper, Wendy Goldstein, and Keri Weintraub to help solidify the foundations of the fraternity. These eight students presented the Student Association of Binghamton University (SABU) with 100 student signatures in support of the formal establishment.

In January 1996, the SABU formally recognized Delta Epsilon Mu fraternity as a student organization. The coed fraternity advocates for health care and education by participating in fundraising, outreach programs, and service activities.

In February 1996, the fraternity hosted its first formal recruitment event, selecting 36 students of various pre-health interests to become the founding members of Delta Epsilon Mu. Its National Founders' Day is recognized on May 3, 1996, in commemoration of the date the first ratification documents for the fraternity were signed.

Though the founders had no expectations of the future growth of the organization, word of the fraternity's establishment met the ears of students at the University of California, Davis, which eventually formed the Beta chapter in 2003. From 2003 to 2009, active charters were issued to the University of Maryland at College Park, the University of Central Florida, the Virginia Commonwealth University, and the University of California, Merced.

The fraternity's first national convention was held at the University of Maryland at College Park in 2013, where the first national bylaws were ratified. The first recognized national executive committee, headed by newly-elected national president John "Jake" Koster and national vice president Bradley Dmuchowski, brought on a new vision for continued growth and establishment of infrastructure. In 2015, the national fraternity was recognized as a tax-exempt 501(c)(3) non-profit corporation by the IRS.

Delta Epsilon Mu is a member of the Professional Fraternity Association.

== Symbols ==
The letters Delta, Epsilon, and Mu were selected for specific meanings. Delta represents fellowship, loyalty, and connection with a shared creed and ideology. Epsilon was selected because it is the astrological name of several nearby stars; it stands for achieving distant goals through cooperation and hard work. Mu represents barely visible entities that have normal influence but have the capacity for significant impact when brought together.

The fraternity's founding principles or pillars are Loyalty, Dedication, Friendship, and Support. Its motto is "Helping People, Together".

The fraternity national emblem was redesigned in 2013 by the Ashley Goldman of Eta chapter to represent all pre-health fields. The colors of Delta Epsilon Mu are crimson red, white, and black. Red symbolizes a passion to succeed. Black and white represent duality and the bringing together individuals of different backgrounds. Graduating members can wear the fraternity's cord, consisting of black and red cords knotted together with tassels at each end.

== Activities ==
The members of Delta Epsilon Mu serve the community by advocating health education and care, and through active participation in service activities, fundraising, and outreach programs. Members are allowed to directly participate in health-oriented workshops and discussions, thereby attaining access to pertinent academic and career information through association with professors, advisors, career professionals, alumni members, and fellow active members.

== National Philanthropy ==
The DrEaM Network is the official philanthropic arm of Delta Epsilon Mu, Inc. (DEM), a national pre-health fraternity. Established as a 501(c)(3) nonprofit, the Network advances DEM’s commitment to service by financially supporting summer camps for children with medical needs and connecting them with dedicated pre-health undergraduate students who staff and enrich their programs.

The DrEaM Network financially supports summer camps serving children with medical needs, while simultaneously providing pre-health undergraduates with unique opportunities for service, learning, and leadership.

Partner Camps

- Camp Skywild - Pickney, Michigan
- Sam’s Adventure Camp - Galveston, Texas
- Camp Korey - Mount Vernon, Washington

Health Internship Program

The DrEaM Network Health Internship Program is a hands-on experiential learning opportunity designed for students interested in healthcare, child development, and nonprofit service. Interns support the Network’s three partner camps. Through the program, interns gain practical experience in areas such as program facilitation, adaptive recreation, health education, and family support. They work directly with campers, assist staff in delivering safe and inclusive camp experiences, and contribute to initiatives that promote wellness and belonging. In addition to direct service, interns participate in professional development, networking with camp staff and healthcare professionals, and learning about the intersection of health, education, and community engagement. The internship fosters leadership, cultural competence, and advocacy skills, preparing participants to make a lasting impact in health-related and service-oriented careers.

== Membership ==
Delta Epsilon Mu focuses on pre-health students in the fields of medicine, nursing, psychology, and veterinary studies. However, its membership is open to students in all majors.

== Governance ==
Delta Epsilon Mu maintains a National Executive Committee, with a national president and eight vice presidents, and nineteen directors. It also has a National Membership Council that meets monthly and holds a national convention annually.

== Chapters ==
In the following list, active chapters are indicated in bold and inactive chapters are in italics.

Chapter	Charter date and range	Institution	Location	Status	Ref.
Alpha	May 3, 1996	Binghamton University	Binghamton, New York	Inactive	
**Beta**	January 17, 2003	University of California, Davis	Davis, California	Active	
**Gamma**	March 3, 2005	University of Maryland, College Park	College Park, Maryland	Active	
**Zeta**	May 13, 2006	University of Central Florida	Orlando, Florida	Active	
Eta	April 25, 2007 – April 5, 2024	Virginia Commonwealth University	Richmond, Virginia	Inactive	(Note: On April 5, 2024, the chapter was suspended until May 5, 2026, for psychological hazing in November 2023. However, the national office revoked its charter on March 28, 2024.)
**Theta**	February 7, 2009	University of California, Merced	Merced, California	Active	
**Iota**	April 16, 2010	George Washington University	Washington, D.C.	Active	
**Kappa**	April 24, 2011	University of Kansas	Lawrence, Kansas	Active	
Lambda	April 15, 2012	Texas A&M University	College Station, Texas	Inactive	
Mu				Unassigned	
**Nu**	May 5, 2012	California State University, Sacramento	Sacramento, California	Active	
Xi	2012	University of Missouri	Columbia, Missouri	Inactive	
Omicron	2012 - 20xx	University of Maryland, Baltimore County	Baltimore, Maryland	Inactive	(Note: Inactive before 2021, as not in archived copy of chapter directory from that date)
Pi	2012	Kansas State University	Manhattan, Kansas	Inactive	
**Rho**	December 1, 2012	University of California, Irvine	Irvine, California	Active	
**Sigma**	April 27, 2013	University of Texas at Austin	Austin, Texas	Active	
**Tau**	May 9, 2014	University of the Pacific	Stockton, California	Active	
**Upsilon**	May 10, 2014	Marist College	Poughkeepsie, New York	Active	
**Phi**	December 6, 2014	Miami University	Oxford, Ohio	Active	
**Chi**	December 7, 2014	University of California, Los Angeles	Los Angeles, California	Active	
**Psi**	December 12, 2014	University of Illinois at Chicago	Chicago, Illinois	Active	
**Alpha Alpha**	April 12, 2015	Wayne State University	Detroit, Michigan	Active	
Alpha Beta	April 19, 2015	University of Richmond	Richmond, Virginia	Inactive	
**Alpha Gamma**	April 19, 2015	Virginia Tech	Blacksburg, Virginia	Active	
**Alpha Zeta**	May 3, 2015	University of Rhode Island	Kingston, Rhode Island	Active	
**Alpha Eta**	December 5, 2015	Florida International University	Miami, Florida	Active	
Alpha Theta	April 3, 2016	University of California, Riverside	Riverside, California	Inactive	
**Alpha Iota**	September 11, 2016	University of Michigan, Ann Arbor	Ann Arbor, Michigan	Active	
**Alpha Kappa**	February 18, 2017	University of Washington	Seattle, Washington	Active	
**Alpha Lambda**	May 13, 2017	University of California, San Diego	La Jolla, California	Active	
**Alpha Nu**	April 14, 2018	University of Pittsburgh	Pittsburgh, Pennsylvania	Active	
**Alpha Xi**	April 15, 2018	Nova Southeastern University	Fort Lauderdale, Florida	Active	
**Alpha Omicron**	February 3, 2019	Santa Clara University	Santa Clara, California	Active	
**Alpha Pi**	April 13, 2019	Stockton University	Galloway Township, New Jersey	Active	
Alpha Rho	May 4, 2019	San Francisco State University	San Francisco, California	Inactive	
**Alpha Sigma**	June 21, 2019	University of California, Santa Barbara	Santa Barbara, California	Active	
**Alpha Tau**	November 24, 2019	New York University	New York City, New York	Active	
**Alpha Upsilon**	May 3, 2020	California State Polytechnic University, Pomona	Pomona, California	Active	(Note: Chapter formed from the Pre-Health Professional Club.)
**Alpha Phi**	November 6, 2020	Case Western Reserve University	Cleveland, Ohio	Active	
**Alpha Chi**	November 8, 2020	Michigan State University	East Lansing, Michigan	Active	
**Alpha Psi**	May 29, 2021	University of California, Berkeley	Berkeley, California	Active	
**Beta Alpha**	May 31, 2021	California State University, Fullerton	Fullerton, California	Active	
**Beta Beta**	July 24, 2021	The College of New Jersey	Ewing Township, New Jersey	Active	
**Beta Gamma**	April 15, 2023	University of Texas at Dallas	Richardson, Texas	Active	
**Beta Zeta**	December 3, 2023	College of William and Mary	Williamsburg, Virginia	Active	
**Beta Eta**	January 18, 2025	Chapman University	Orange, California	Active	

== See also ==
- Professional fraternities and sororities
- Honor cords
