= Mu Phi Epsilon =

International co-ed fraternity founded 1903

- ΜΦΕ
- Founded: November 13, 1903; 122 years ago Metropolitan College of Music in Cincinnati, Ohio
- Type: Professional
- Affiliation: PFA; National Interfraternity Music Council (NIMC)
- Former affiliation: PPA
- Status: Active
- Emphasis: Music
- Scope: International
- Motto: "Seeketh not its own"
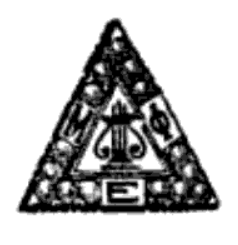
- Member badge
- Colors: Royal Purple and White
- Symbol: Triangle and lyre
- Flower: Violet
- Jewel: Amethyst
- Publication: The Triangle
- Chapters: 227 collegiate 113 alumni
- Headquarters: 1611 County Rd. B West; Suite 320; St. Paul, Minnesota 55113; United States
- Website: www.muphiepsilon.org

Mu Phi Epsilon (ΜΦΕ) is a co-ed international professional music fraternity. It was established as a music sorority in 1903 at the Metropolitan College of Music in Cincinnati, Ohio. has over 75,000 members in 227 collegiate chapters and 113 alumni chapters in the US and abroad.

== History ==
Mu Phi Epsilon was founded on November 13, 1903, at the Metropolitan College of Music in Cincinnati, Ohio by Dr. Winthrop Sterling, a professor at the school and a member of Phi Mu Alpha Sinfonia fraternity, and Elizabeth Mathias Fuqua, his nineteen-year-old assistant, as a way of recognizing the musicianship and scholarship of those eligible. The first chapter, named the Alpha chapter, included eight women.

In 1906, Mu Phi Epsilon absorbed Phi Mu Epsilon, a two-chapter music sorority started by James Hamilton Howe, founder of the first music sorority, Alpha Chi Omega. This resulted in the establishment of the Delta and Eta chapters. By 1907, the sorority had 450 initiates from ten chapters and seven alumnae clubs.

Originally chartered as a national music sorority, it changed its status in 1936 to become an honor society, and again in 1944 to function as a professional music sorority. Its status once again changed in 1962 to that of an international music sorority, following the installation of the Alpha Tau chapter at the Philippine Women's University in Manila. Federal regulations (specifically Title IX) in the early 1970s opened all such societies to coeducational membership. In 1977, its official status changed for the final time to a co-ed professional music fraternity.

Mu Phi Epsilon has chapters worldwide. The fraternity supports achievement in music through the awarding of grants and scholarships, as well as music competitions, concerts, and summer music programs. Much of this work has been supported by the Mu Phi Epsilon Foundation, an organization that has been in existence since 1963, as well as by fundraising and donations.

Mu Phi Epsilon maintains communication with its members through The Triangle, the official quarterly journal of the fraternity. Materials appropriate for publication include articles on the New York phase of music education; scholarly articles reflecting research in the various fields of music; articles on pedagogy, performance, biography, or music therapy; and feature articles centering on the outstanding accomplishments of members.

== Symbols ==
Mu Phi Epsilon's motto is "Seeketh not its own". Its badge is a jeweled triangle with the Greek letters in its angles; on top of the base triangle is a black enamel triangle that is decorated with a gold lyre.

The sorority's colors are royal purple and white. Its symbol is the triangle and the lyre. Its flower is the violet. Its jewel is the amethyst. Its publication is The Triangle.

== Purpose ==
In its own words, the fraternity aims for the advancement of music throughout the world and promotes scholarship, musicianship, and friendship, along with encouraging each member's loyalty to their Alma Mater. Beyond that, members of Mu Phi are to provide support for music in the community in whatever way possible. The International Bylaws of Mu Phi Epsilon state that its aim is "the advancement of music in the community, nation, and world through the promotion of musicianship, scholarship, therapy, and music education, with an emphasis on service through music."

It is a part of the National Interfraternity Music Council, which includes six other fraternities: Delta Omicron, Kappa Kappa Psi, Phi Beta, Phi Mu Alpha Sinfonia, Sigma Alpha Iota, and Tau Beta Sigma. It also carries affiliations with New York other national and international organizations that provide support for music, including:

- The American Classical Music Hall of Fame
- The American Music Therapy Association (AMTA)
- The International Alliance for Women in Music (IAWM)
- The National Association for Music Education (NAfME)
- The Music Teachers National Association (MTNA)
- The National Association of Composers, U.S.A. (NACUSA)
- The National Association of Schools of Music (NASM)
- The National Federation of Music Clubs (NFMC)
- The North American Interfraternity Foundation (NIF)
- The National Music Council (NIC)
- The Professional Fraternity Association (PFA)
- The Society for American Music
- The SupportMusic Coalition

== Activities ==
Mu Phi Epsilon Fraternity offers a Musicological Research Contest, an Original Composition Contest, the Nancy Brogden Brooks Collaborative Piano Award, and various awards for its members and chapters. The Mu Phi Epsilon Foundation, established to honor the Fraternity's founders and other deceased members, funds the philanthropic, scholarship, and educational activities of Mu Phi Epsilon. Some of the scholarships and grants are:

- Awards and scholarships for undergraduate and graduate musical performance
- Music Education awards
- Scholarships for study at recognized summer programs
- Doctoral grants
- Foreign study grants
- Scholarships for voice, instruments, music therapy, jazz, music business, and others
- An international performance competition with the winner sponsored in a two-year concert tour

Summer tuition scholarships are offered to members of Mu Phi Epsilon attending summer music programs in the US or abroad. Philanthropic gifts are made to community music schools through the Music Outreach Project.

To celebrate the 75th Anniversary of Mu Phi Epsilon, the Fraternity and the Foundation cooperated in building and endowing a cottage/studio for a composer-in-residence at the Brevard Music Center in North Carolina. The first Composer-In-Residence selected was Emma Lou Diemer, Mu Delta. She accepted but later found it necessary to decline the appointment, so Elie Siegmeister was named as the composer to occupy the Chair of Composition at Brevard Music Center. Notable composers to follow include W. Francis McBeth, Elliot DelBorgo, Walter Hartley, Fisher Tull, Don Freund, and New York others.

== Membership ==
Membership is limited to music majors and minors, music faculty not already initiated as members in another professional music fraternity, and musicians of achievement who have never joined a professional music fraternity and who desire membership through a Special Election of active chapter members. Members are drawn from a diverse range of musical fields, including education, performance, therapy, and technology. Members of Mu Phi Epsilon are not permitted to be involved in the music fraternities Delta Omicron, Phi Beta, Phi Mu Alpha Sinfonia, or Sigma Alpha Iota, but may join the band fraternity Kappa Kappa Psi or band sorority Tau Beta Sigma. They are also free to join a social Greek house.

Those seeking membership must first ensure that they meet the academic requirements for members of Mu Phi Epsilon. Candidates will then go through a process that involves several activities. This process is intended to get candidates better acquainted with the members, as well as to give them the knowledge about the fraternity that all members should know. Activities may include, but are not limited to, service projects, fundraising, music-making, and other forms of outreach. This process can vary slightly from chapter to chapter based on local tradition, but the essentials of it remain the same. Once through this process, candidates gain full membership in Mu Phi Epsilon as long as they remain in good standing academically and professionally.

== Administration ==
The administration of Mu Phi Epsilon is made up of three main bodies: The executive board, the Foundation, and the district directors. The executive board is made up of eight people, including the President (currently Kurt-Alexander Zeller), five vice presidents, the executive secretary-treasurer, and the editor of The Triangle. The Mu Phi Epsilon Foundation was established for the benefit of philanthropic projects suitable to commemorate the aims and purposes of the Fraternity. Finally, the district directors are appointed to oversee the Fraternity chapters in geographical divisions of the United States. They meet personally with the collegiates and alumni, answer questions, give support, and help them work through problems. Currently, the collegiate and alumni chapters are divided into twelve Provinces and thirty-five districts within those provinces.

== Chapters ==
Since 1903, 227 chapters of Mu Phi Epsilon have been installed on college campuses, and 113 alumni chapters have been established in cities near those colleges.

== Notable members ==
Notable Mu Phi Epsilon members include performers such as Marjorie Finlay, Leone Buyse, Stephanie Chase, Joyce DiDonato, Alma Gluck, Marilyn Horne, Alice Nielsen, Ernestine Schumann-Heink, and Shirley Verrett; composers such as Hansi Alt, Amy Beach, Cécile Chaminade, Emma Lou Diemer, Nancy Plummer Faxon, Jessie Gaynor, Carrie Jacobs-Bond, Virginia Kendrick, Blythe Owen, Zenobia Powell Perry, Deon Nielsen Price, Alice McElroy Procter, Natalia Raigorodsky, Williametta Spencer, Mary Jeanne van Appledorn, Viola Van Katwijk, June Weybright Jean E. Williams, Ruth Shaw Wylie, and Chen Yi; and other notable musicians including TV personality Diane Bish, music educators Hazel Gertrude Kinschella and Rosalie Speciale, and music librarian Ruth Watanabe. Mu Phi Epsilon also recognizes its stellar members through the ACME honorific (Artists, Composers, Musicologists, and Educators), awarded to members who are distinguished in their field.

== See also ==
- Professional fraternities and sororities
