= Phi Delta Gamma =

Phi Delta Gamma (ΦΔΓ) may refer to:

- Phi Delta Gamma (fraternity), a men's general fraternity
- Phi Delta Gamma (professional), a defunct professional fraternity in Forensics
- Phi Delta Gamma (recognition), a professional sorority for women graduate students
- Phi Delta Gamma (social), a Puerto Rican social fraternity
