= Sally Daley =

American church organist (1941–2020)

- Born: October 24, 1941; Allentown, Pennsylvania
- Died: April 10, 2020 (aged 78); Illinois
- Education: Northwestern University
- Occupations: Church musician, organist and composer

Sally Daley (October 24, 1941 – April 10, 2020) was an American church musician, organist and composer.

Daley was born in Allentown, Pennsylvania and studied music at Northwestern University in Evanston, Illinois. She served as a musician at various churches in the Chicago area and, since 2007, had been the music director at St. Mary Goretti Church in Schiller Park, Illinois. As a member of the Mu Phi Epsilon International Professional Music Fraternity, she twice received honorable mentions at their international composition competitions. Daley was also a member of the National Pastoral Musicians and the Creative Musicians Coalition and the Franciscan Order of the Queenship of Mary.

She was living in Illinois when she died.
