= McCoy College of Business =

Texas State University business school

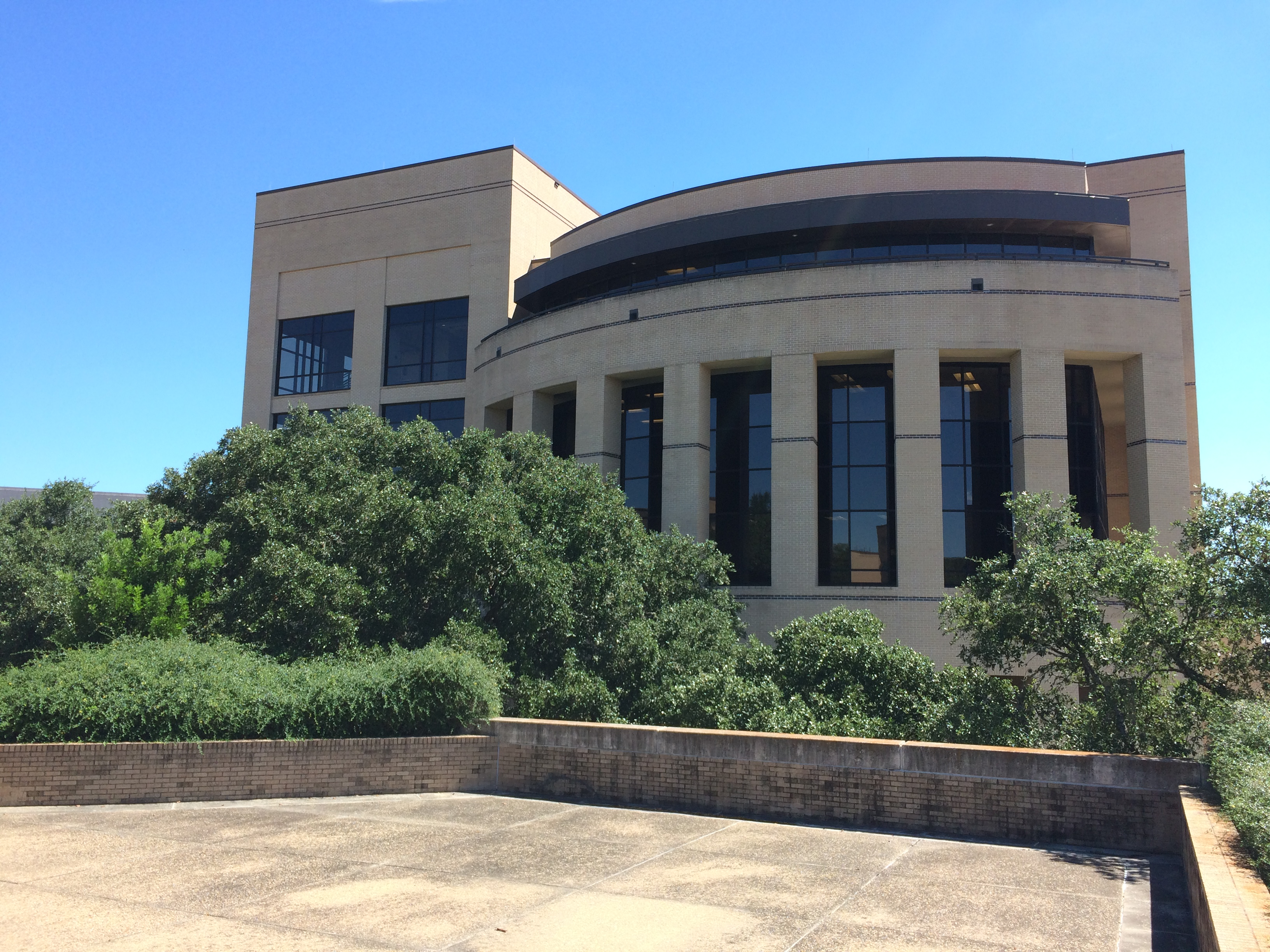
- Former names: College of Business Administration
- Type: Public business school
- Established: 1968
- Dean: Dr. Sanjay Ramchander
- Students: 3,650
- Undergraduates: 3,200
- Postgraduates: 450
- Address: 601 University Drive, San Marcos, Texas, U.S. 29.888088°N 97.944618°W
- Affiliations: Texas State University; AACSB
- Website: mccoy.txstate.edu

The McCoy College of Business is the business school of Texas State University. The college offers curriculum for both undergraduate and graduate students and receives its business accreditation from the Association to Advance Collegiate Schools of Business.

Established in 1968, Texas State's business school was originally known as the College of Business Administration. Following a $20 million gift from local businessman and wife Emmett and Miriam McCoy in 2004, the school was formally renamed the Emmett and Miriam McCoy College of Business Administration. The endowment, now administered by the McCoy College of Business Development Foundation, provides distinguished professorships, scholarships to both undergraduates and graduates, and program development. Later, the McCoys were awarded honorary doctorates, being the seventh and eighth individuals receiving such awards from Texas State University.

The College contains five departments: Accounting; Computer information systems and QMST; Marketing; Management; Finance and Economics.

== Academic profile ==
The McCoy College of Business's degree programs require prior admission into the college. Students completing one of McCoy College's BBA degree programs are not required to pursue a minor. Students in outside majors are allowed to pursue a minor in either Economics or Business Administration.

=== Notable organizations ===
- Alpha Kappa Psi ΑΚΨ (Coed Professional Business Fraternity)
- Beta Gamma Sigma ΒΓΣ (International Business Honor Society)
- Beta Alpha Psi (International Business Honor Society)
- Collegiate Entrepreneurs' Organization CEO (Entrepreneurship Club)
- Epsilon Nu Tau ENT (Co-ed Entrepreneurship Fraternity)
- Students in Free Enterprise
- American Marketing Association
- Association of Information Technology Professionals
- Students in International Business
- Financial Management Association
- Student Managed Investment Fund

== McCoy Hall ==
McCoy Hall finished construction and was dedicated in 2006. Funding for the facility was achieved primarily through the McCoy's generous $20 million donation, thus coining the name for the building.

=== Trading Lab ===
The T. Paul Bulmahn Research and Trading Lab is housed on the third floor of McCoy Hall. Funded through a $1.5 million donation made by ATP Oil & Gas Corp Chairman and President T. Paul Bulmahn, the lab allows students to trade in a "real world" environment.

The facility includes 30 dual-monitor workstations, eight Bloomberg Terminals, and several large LCD displays showing current financial market information, headlines, lab hours and other announcements. A 90-foot (27 m) LED ticker also rests outside the entrance showing current headlines and financial market activity.
