= Delta Sigma Pi =

Professional business fraternity in the US

- ΔΣΠ
- Founded: November 7, 1907; 118 years ago New York University
- Type: Professional
- Affiliation: PFA
- Former affiliation: PIC
- Status: Active
- Emphasis: Business
- Scope: National
- Member badge
- Colors: Old gold and Royal purple
- Flower: Red Rose
- Publication: The DELTASIG
- Chapters: 305 established collegiate, 224 active collegiate, 55 active alumni
- Members: 12,000+ active 300,000+ lifetime
- Nickname: Deltasig
- Headquarters: 330 South Campus Ave. Oxford, Ohio 45056; United States
- Website: www.deltasigmapi.org

Delta Sigma Pi (ΔΣΠ) (officially the International Fraternity of Delta Sigma Pi, Inc.) is a coeducational professional business fraternity and one of the largest in the United States. Delta Sigma Pi was founded on November 7, 1907, at the School of Commerce, Accounts and Finance of New York University (NYU) in New York, New York and is currently headquartered in Oxford, Ohio. The Fraternity has 224 active collegiate chapters, 1 startup group, 55 franchised alumni chapters, and over 300,000 initiated members.

== History ==
Delta Sigma Pi was established on November 7, 1907 at New York University's School of Commerce, Accounts and Finance. Its founders were:

- Alexander F. Makay
- H. Albert Tienken
- Harold V. Jacobs
- Alfred Moysello

Delta Sigma Pi was established to foster the study of business at the university level. Its goals include:

- to encourage social activity among business students,
- to build relationships with the commercial world,
- to promote strong ethical standards, and
- to enhance the civic and commercial welfare of the community.

The second chapter was founded at Northwestern School of Commerce. National meetings, called the Grand Chapter Congress, became a regular tradition and to this day the national fraternity meets every other year to conduct business and elect its national leaders.

After rapid expansion in the early 1920s, the fraternity opened its national headquarters in Chicago, Illinois in 1924. In 1957, the central office moved to Oxford, Ohio adjacent to the campus of Miami University.

The biggest change in the history of the Fraternity took place in 1975, as the Board of Directors mandated that chapters were allowed to initiate female business students, to conform with Title IX.

== Symbols ==
The badge of Delta Sigma Pi is a skull and crossbones, superimposed on a wreath of leaves. The letters Δ, Σ, and Π are inscribed on the skull, set with amethyst eyes, a crown on top highlighted in red lacquer, often enhanced with surrounding pearls.

The colors of Delta Sigma Pi are old gold and royal purple. The red rose was adopted as the flower of Deltasig at the first Board of Directors meeting in 1921. It was primarily the gift given to the wives and courted women of Deltasig brothers (which at the time was still all male). One of the founding members, Harold V. Jacobs, suggested a rose as the official fraternity flower because his wife loved roses and it was also her first name (Rose Jacobs). Five years later, in 1926, Jacobs also suggested that the song currently sung at LEAD schools and Grand Chapter Congress events, Rose of Deltasig be adopted as the official song of the fraternity.

In 1911 the fraternity published its first newsletter, which soon would be named The Deltasig.

== Chapters ==
Since its inception in 1907, Delta Sigma Pi has installed 305 collegiate chapters, of which 224 are currently active. The fraternity has 55 alumni chapters on its roll for the 2024–2025 year in the United States.

== See also ==
- Professional fraternities and sororities
- Professional Fraternity Association
