= Phi Beta Gamma =

Professional law fraternity, dormant

- ΦΒΓ
- Founded: April 24, 1922; 104 years ago Georgetown University School of Law
- Type: Professional
- Former affiliation: PFA
- Status: Defunct
- Emphasis: Law
- Scope: National
- Colors: Blue and Gold
- Publication: The Advocate; Blue and Gold
- Chapters: 7
- Members: 2,500 (est.) lifetime
- Headquarters: Baltimore, Maryland; United States

Phi Beta Gamma (ΦΒΓ) was an American professional fraternity in the field of law. It was established at Georgetown University School of Law in 1922.

== History ==
Phi Beta Gamma was founded on April 24, 1922, at Georgetown University School of Law. Its goals were to install its members with the ethics and ideals of law, to encourage the study of the technical rules of law, and to improve the facilities of law schools.

Its members adopted Canons of Ethics and Rules of Conduct and secret ritualistic degrees. Membership in Phi Beta Gamma was limited to male law students. However, the organization also included alumni and honorary members. Its officers were called chief justice, associate justice, secretary, treasurer, and bailiff.

Phi Beta Gamma incorporated in Washington, D.C. as a national fraternity in April 1922. The Beta chapter formed at the National University School of Law in 1924, followed by the Gamma chapter at the Minneapolis College of Law in 1925.

Although the fraternity had a social aspect with parties, banquets, and dances, it encouraged its members to be active in campus political and social affairs and to develop relationships with faculty. Alumni and honorary members were expected to assist collegiate members in their studies through quiz lectures and legal discussions. As a result, the fraternity established a central agency to maintain a connection with alumni members. The fraternity held its first national convention in Washington, D.C., in 1924. By 1950, it had six chapters and had initiated 1,600 members, making it the smallest of the law fraternities at the time.

Phi Beta Gamma was a founding member of the Professional Interfraternity Conference (PIC) in 1928. The fraternity was headquartered in Washington, D.C., but moved to Baltimore, Maryland sometime before 1963. Its original publication was called Blue and Gold. Later, it published a quarterly journal called The Advocate.

== Symbols ==
Phi Beta Gamma's colors were blue and gold.

The fraternity had both a badge and a watch key in the shape of an inverted triangle bearing the Greek letters ΦΒΓ. Phi Beta Gamma also had a scholarship key that was shaped like an open book bearing the fraternity's coat of arms. The scholarship key was exclusively for the member with the highest grade point average in each class.

== Chapters ==
The chapters of Phi Beta Gamma follow, with inactive chapters and institutions in italics. (Note: A review of campus websites shows that all chapters are dormant.)

Chapter	Charter date and range	Institution	Location	Status	Ref.
Alpha	April 24, 1922	Georgetown University Law School	Washington, D.C.	Inactive	
Beta	1924–1954	National University School of Law	Washington, D.C.	Merged	(Note: National University School of Law merged with the George Washington University Law School in 1954.)
Gamma	1925–1940	Minneapolis College of Law	Minneapolis, Minnesota	Inactive	(Note: This school closed in 1940, in a merger with the Minnesota College of Law) (Note: This school, with eight other predecessor schools, would eventually coalesce into what is now the Mitchell Hamline School of Law.)
Delta	1925–1956 ?	St. Paul College of Law	Saint Paul, Minnesota	Inactive	(Note: In a merger of law schools, the St. Paul College of Law became the William Mitchell College of Law in 1956. A 2015 merger created the Mitchell Hamline School of Law.)
Epsilon	1925	George Washington University Law School	Washington, D.C.	Inactive	
Zeta	1926	Loyola University New Orleans College of Law	New Orleans, Louisiana	Inactive	
Eta	1927–19xx	Cumberland School of Law	Homewood, Alabama	Inactive	
Theta	1929	Jefferson School of Law	Louisville, Kentucky	Inactive	
Iota	1932	University of Baltimore School of Law	Baltimore, Maryland	Inactive	
Kappa	1932	University of Miami School of Law	Coral Gables, Florida	Inactive	
Lambda	1939	University of Tulsa College of Law	Tulsa, Oklahoma	Inactive	(Note: Chapter formed from the Tulsa Law Club (local))
