= Chi Beta Phi =

American science honor society

- ΧΒΦ
- Founded: April 1916; 110 years ago Randolph–Macon College
- Type: Professional
- Former affiliation: PIC
- Status: Active
- Emphasis: Science
- Scope: National
- Motto: Scientia Omnia Vincit "Science Conquers All"
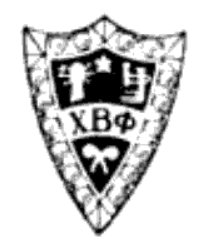
- Member badge
- Colors: Colonial blue and Crimson
- Flower: Cape jasmine
- Tree: Ginkgo biloba
- Publication: The Chi Beta Phi Record; The Chi Beta Phi Newsletter
- Chapters: 26
- Members: 7,000 lifetime
- Headquarters: c/o Dr. Michelle Mabry; 100 Campus Drive; Elkins, West Virginia 26241; United States
- Website: www.chibetaphi.org/index.htm

Chi Beta Phi (ΧΒΦ) is a professional fraternity in the field of science.

== History ==
Chi Beta Phi was founded in April, 1916 at Randolph–Macon College. It recognizes a sole founder in John Howard Greene. The fraternity's purpose was to promote interest in sciences using reviews of current investigations, by promoting lectures by prominent scientists, distributing papers prepared by its members, and general discussion. The Fraternity existed as a local organization for four years, but began to expand during the 1921-22 school year, when three additional chapters were added.

A national convention occurred on May 5, 1922 which determined an interest in national expansion. By 1925, individual chapter names were determined, a constitution and national program was developed, and the fraternity was on its way to opening 33 chapters over the next century.

Chi Beta Phi was a charterer of the Professional Interfraternity Conference, but has since withdrawn its membership.

Chi Beta Phi was named an affiliate of the American Association for the Advancement of Science (AAAS) in 1935.

The fraternity became co-educational on May 11, 1939, when it merged with its sister society, Chi Beta Phi-Sigma.

== Symbols. ==
Chi Beta Phi's official colors are Colonial blue and Crimson.

Its coat of arms is a shield, draped and showing beveled edges. At upper left, on the shield is an electrode, to symbolize the science of Physics. At upper right is placed a microscope, to symbolize both Biology and Psychology. At the top of the crest is a star to symbolize both Astronomy and Math. The Computer Sciences are alluded to by its surrounding rays. At the lower portion of the crest are two retorts, to symbolize Geology and Chemistry. The letters of the fraternity are placed across the center, and the motto is on the ribbon below.

The motto of the Fraternity is Scientia Omnia Vincit or "Science Conquers All".

The official flower is the Cape jasmine, and the official tree is the Ginkgo biloba.

== Chapters ==
These are the chapters of Chi Beta Phi. Chapters noted in bold are active, chapters in italics are dormant.

Chapter	Charter date and range	Institution	Location	Status	Ref.
**Alpha**	April 1916	Randolph–Macon College	Ashland, Virginia	Active	
Beta	1921-1939	College of William & Mary	Williamsburg, Virginia	Inactive	
**Gamma**	1921	Hampden–Sydney College	Hampden Sydney, Virginia	Active	
Delta	1921-1925	Emory University	Atlanta, Georgia	Inactive	
**Epsilon**	1923	University of Charleston	Charleston, West Virginia	Active	(Note: May have had an earlier name of Epsilon Sigma chapter.)
**Zeta**	1925	Davis & Elkins College	Elkins, West Virginia	Active	
Eta	1925-1940	Presbyterian College	Clinton, South Carolina	Inactive	
Theta	1925-1939	Wofford College	Spartanburg, South Carolina	Inactive	
Iota	1925-1940	University of Alabama	Tuscaloosa, Alabama	Inactive	
Kappa	1925-20xx ?	Marshall University	Huntington, West Virginia	Inactive	
Lambda	1925-1931	West Virginia University Institute of Technology	Beckley, West Virginia	Inactive	
Mu	1926-19xx ?	University of North Carolina Wilmington	Wilmington, North Carolina	Inactive	
Nu ?	1928-19xx ?	Furman University	Greenville, South Carolina	Inactive	
Theta Xi	1929-1933; 1945-19xx ?	University at Buffalo	Buffalo, New York	Inactive	
Omicron	1930-1937	Centre College	Danville, Kentucky	Inactive	
Pi ?	1930-19xx ?	Concord University	Athens, West Virginia	Inactive	
Alpha Sigma (first)	1932-19xx ?	Agnes Scott College	Decatur, Georgia	Inactive	
**Rho**	1935-1936; 1939	West Liberty University	West Liberty, West Virginia	Active	
Sigma	1935-1936	Austin College	Sherman, Texas	Inactive	
Tau	1935-19xx ?	Rhodes College	Memphis, Tennessee	Inactive	
Beta Sigma ?	1935-xxxx ?	University of Alabama	Tuscaloosa, Alabama	Inactive	
Delta Sigma ?	1937	Davis & Elkins College	Elkins, West Virginia	Inactive	
Zeta Sigma ?	1939-19xx ?	Furman University	Greenville, South Carolina	Inactive	
Eta Sigma ?	1939-19xx ?	Concord University	Athens, West Virginia	Inactive	
Upsilon	1940-1942	University of North Carolina	Chapel Hill, North Carolina	Inactive	
Iota Sigma	1941-19xx ?	Radford University	Radford, Virginia	Inactive	
**Theta Sigma**	1941	Limestone University	Gaffney, South Carolina	Active	
**Kappa Sigma**	1945	University of Mary Washington	Fredericksburg, Virginia	Active	
Phi	1947-20xx ?	University of Memphis	Memphis, Tennessee	Inactive	
Chi	1948-20xx ?	Columbia College (South Carolina)	Columbia, South Carolina	Inactive	
Omega	1948-20xx ?	University of Lynchburg	Lynchburg, Virginia	Inactive	
Alpha Alpha	1951-1972	Parsons College	Fairfield, Iowa	Inactive	(Note: Parsons College ceased operations in 1973.)
**Alpha Beta**	1952	Lenoir–Rhyne University	Hickory, North Carolina	Active	
Alpha Gamma	1953-19xx ?	East Carolina University	Greenville, North Carolina	Inactive	
**Alpha Delta**	1953	Franklin College (Indiana)	Franklin, Indiana	Active	
**Alpha Epsilon**	1954	Keuka College	Keuka Park, New York	Active	
Alpha Zeta	1955-20xx ?	William Carey University	Hattiesburg, Mississippi	Inactive	
Alpha Eta	1957-20xx ?	Newberry College	Newberry, South Carolina	Inactive	
Alpha Theta	1963-xxxx ?	Indiana University of Pennsylvania	Indiana, Pennsylvania	Inactive	
**Alpha Iota**	1964	Glenville State University	Glenville, West Virginia	Active	
Alpha Kappa	1964-xxxx ?	Athens State University	Athens, Alabama	Inactive	
Alpha Lambda	1967 ? -xxxx ?	Whitworth University or Whitworth Female College ?	Seattle, Washington or Brookhaven, Mississippi	Inactive	(Note: Whitworth Female College, of Brookhaven, MS, ceased operations in 1938. This school name appears to have been listed in error on the national website, rather than the similarly-named school in Seattle, WA. A professor at the Seattle school is a member of Chi Beta Phi.)
Alpha Mu	1968-xxxx ?	Alderson Broaddus University	Philippi, West Virginia	Inactive	
Alpha Nu	1968-xxxx ?	Spalding University	Louisville, Kentucky	Inactive	
Epsilon Sigma	1965-xxxx ?	State University of New York at Oneonta	Oneonta, New York	Inactive	
Alpha Xi	1969-xxxx ?	St. Francis College	Brooklyn, New York	Inactive	
Alpha Omicron	1969-xxxx ?	North Carolina Wesleyan University	Rocky Mount, North Carolina	Inactive	
Alpha Pi	1970-xxxx ?	University of Rio Grande	Rio Grande, Ohio	Inactive	
**Alpha Rho**	1973	Lyon College	Batesville, Arkansas	Active	
**Alpha Sigma (second)**	1975	Molloy College	Rockville Centre, New York	Active	
Alpha Tau	1984-xxxx ?	Rust College	Holly Springs, Mississippi	Inactive	
Alpha Upsilon	1985-xxxx ?	Shenandoah University	Winchester, Virginia	Inactive	
**Alpha Phi**	2012	University of Mobile	Mobile, Alabama	Active	
Alpha Chi	2015-20xx ?	University of Colorado Boulder	Boulder, Colorado	Inactive	

== External Lists ==
Official website
