= Phi Delta Epsilon =

International collegiate medical fraternity

- ΦΔΕ
- Founded: October 13, 1904; 122 years ago Weill Cornell Medical College of Cornell University
- Type: Professional
- Affiliation: PFA
- Former affiliation: PIC
- Status: Active
- Emphasis: Medicine
- Scope: International
- Motto: Facta Non Verba "Deeds Not Words"
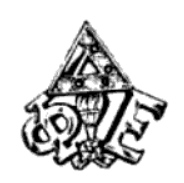
- Member badge
- Colors: Royal purple and Ivory
- Symbol: Caduceus
- Flower: Scarlet red carnation
- Jewel: Amethyst and Pearl
- Philanthropy: Children's Miracle Network
- Chapters: 81 pre-medical, 101 medical
- Members: 35,000 lifetime
- Headquarters: 714 Lyndon Lane, Suite 1 Louisville, Kentucky 40222; United States
- Website: www.phide.org

Phi Delta Epsilon (ΦΔΕ) (commonly known as PhiDE) is a co-ed international medical fraternity founded at Cornell Medical College and a member of the Professional Fraternity Association.

== History ==
Phi Delta Epsilon was founded on October 13, 1904, at Cornell University Medical College. Founders were:

- Aaron Brown
- Henry Aaronson
- Michael Halpern Barsky
- Bernard Hyle Eliasberg
- Irving Harold Engel
- Philip Frank
- Abraham Leon Garbat
- William Isidore Wallach

During the first decade of this century, there were many doors closed to Jewish medical students and physicians, doors which would not fully open until after World War II. In 1904, it was not uncommon for American medical schools and medical fraternities to have quotas limiting the admission of Jewish students. Thus, Brown and his friends decided to start their fraternal organization, guided by the precepts of philanthropy, deity, and equity.

Soon after, more chapters were organized in the East and Midwest. In 1918, Phi Delta Epsilon amalgamated with Alpha Phi Sigma, a medical fraternity organized in 1908, whose ideals and principles were similar to those of PhiDE. Its seven existing chapters were in the Midwest and West, which geographically complemented the existing PhiDE chapters.

Following the merge, the chapters were divided into districts, and by 1930, enough members had graduated from medical schools to form graduate clubs. In 1926, an Endowment Fund was started. In the 1940s, the Aaron Brown Lectureship Program was begun and has remained an important chapter event through the years.

In the late 1960s, the fraternity opened its membership to women and encouraged recruitment of medical students of all races, nationalities, and religious beliefs. The fraternity's membership diversified throughout the following decades. The addition of the premedical affiliation in 1994 at Binghamton University rounded out the fraternity's membership, which now spans an entire lifetime of medical education and practice.

The fraternity has over 35,000 practicing professionals in its active network.

== Symbols ==
The motto of Phi Delta Epsilon Facta Non Verba or "Deeds Not Words". The seal of the fraternity consists of the scales of justice with the letters Phi, Delta, and Epsilon on the sides and at the bottom. The scale is balanced upon a caduceus with a Delta as its base. The letter Alpha appears beside the left wing and the letter Sigma beside the right. Above the center of the wings is a star containing the letter Phi.

Throughout its history, the fraternity has recognized three badges. The first and oldest badge includes the Greek letter Phi on its left side, Delta at its top, and Epsilon on its right. The Delta is set with pearls on its sides and amethysts at its angles. Below the Delta is a torch, and in front of the torch is a bow with a ruby at its center. All badges are identical, but as occasion demands various stones are placed therein to designate successful completion of a term in a specific International Board office. The fraternity's premedical badge is made of 14-carat gold and is triangular. The left side of its face is purple, while the right side is ivory. The medical badge, also made of 14-carat gold, consists of a torch centered in front of the outline of a triangle. Both badge and seal may only be used or worn by initiated members.

The fraternity's colors are Royal purple and ivory. Other symbols of PhiDE include amethyst, pearl, and the scarlet red carnation.

== Chapters ==
Phi Delta Epsilon has chartered 101 medical school chapters and 81 pre-medical chapters, including 12 international.

== See also ==
- List of Jewish fraternities and sororities
- Professional fraternities and sororities
