= St Anselm's School, Bakewell =

S. Anselm's School
- School Coat of Arms

Location
- Stanedge Road; Bakewell, Derbyshire, DE45 1DP; England
- Coordinates: 53.2154°N 1.6820°W

Information
- Type: Private day and boarding, Nursery, Pre-Prep and Preparatory
- Motto: Esse Quam Videri ('To be, rather than to seem to be')
- Religious affiliation: Church of England
- Established: 1888
- Founder: William Storrs Fox
- Closed: 2025
- Department for Education URN: 113002 Tables
- Headteacher: Peter Cook
- Gender: Co-educational
- Age range: 3-13
- Enrollment: ~250
- Houses: 4
- Colours: Yellow; Red; Blue; Green
- Former pupils: Old Anselmians https://www.oldanselmians.co.uk/
- Website: www.sanselms.co.uk

S. Anselm's Preparatory School is a private school located in Bakewell, Derbyshire, in the heart of the Peak District. It offers flexi, weekly and full boarding for pupils aged 3–13.

== History ==
S Anselm's was founded in 1888 by William Storrs Fox. In the first years it was a boys' boarding preparatory school. Storrs Fox was a graduate of Cambridge and a naturalist. He quickly established the reputation of the school. He took as a motto for the school 'Esse quam videri' (to be, rather than to seem). Already after a year he constructed an aviary in the school garden. In 2023 it was announced that S.Anselm's will join the Birkdale family of schools.

In March 2025, it was announced that the school would close at the end of the 2025 year. It was later reported, in May 2025, that the school would be saved. The school is now independent with a new interim head in place for the September 2025 term.
