= Delta Epsilon Iota =

American collegiate honor society

- ΔΕΙ
- Founded: 1994; 32 years ago University of Georgia
- Type: Honor
- Former affiliation: PFA
- Status: Unknown
- Emphasis: Career development
- Scope: National (US)
- Pillars: Dedication, Enthusiasm, and Initiative
- Colors: Blue and Gold
- Publication: The Resume
- Chapters: 100+
- Nickname: DEI
- Headquarters: 6 Concourse Pkwy NE, Suite 3100; Atlanta, Georgia 30328; United States

Delta Epsilon Iota (ΔΕΙ) is an honor society formed to recognize academic excellence across all disciplines, that began at the University of Georgia in 1994. It is a national honor society for career development.

== History ==
Delta Epsilon Iota was founded in 1994 at the University of Georgia as an honor society that recognizes academic excellence in all fields of study. The founders were Andrew J. Bond, associate director of career planning and placement, and Richard M. Drye, a student. At the time, Drye was being recruited by the “Big 6″ accounting firms while still an undergraduate. The idea of the society was a reaction to the increase in this type of recruiting tactic.

Delta Epsilon Iota is a national honor society for career development. The society works with university career centers to help students find jobs and career success after graduation. It "serves as a bridge between undergraduates and career services".

Its national headquarters moved to Atlanta, Georgia, in 1999. It operates the Delta Epsilon Iota National Scholarship Fund. By 2002, the society had more than 100 chapters.

Delta Epsilon Iota is a former member of the Professional Fraternity Association. It is an affiliate member of the National Association of Colleges and Employers (NACE).

== Symbols and traditions ==
Delta Epsilon Iota's colors are blue and gold. its publication is The Resume. The society's principles or pillars are Dedication, Enthusiasm and Initiative.

== Activities ==
The society presents three scholarships, including the Delta Honor Awards for extraordinary achievement in all areas of campus life, the Epsilon Honor Awards for exceptional involvement outside the classroom, and the Iota Honor Awards for charitable service. Chapters volunteer in campus career centers, host resume workshops, host a Career Fest, and conduct philanthropic activities.

== Membership ==
Membership requirements for Delta Epsilon Iota are:

- 3.30 GPA on a 4.00 scale or ranking in the top 15% of their class
- Completed at least 30 semester hours
- Enrolled in an accredited college or university and have verification of academic standing

== Chapters ==
Following is an incomplete list of Delta Epsilon Iota chapters. Active chapters noted in bold, inactive chapters noted in italics.

Chapter	Charter date	Institution	Location	Status	Ref.
	1994	University of Georgia	Athens, Georgia		
	Before April 2007	Texas Lutheran University	Seguin, Texas		
**Omicron Iota**	Fall 2010	University of Texas at Dallas	Richardson, Texas	Active	
	Before 2011	Baylor University	Waco, Texas		
	Before November 2011	Georgia Southern University	Statesboro, Georgia		
**Phi Iota**	Before Fall 2013	University of South Florida	Tampa, Florida		
	Before 2014	Southern Illinois University Carbondale	Carbondale, Illinois		
	2014	Ohio State University	Columbus, Ohio		
	2014	University of North Texas	Denton, Texas		
	2014	Florida Atlantic University	Boca Raton, Florida		
	2014	Mississippi College	Clinton, Mississippi		
Alpha Xi Iota	2015	University of Great Falls	Great Falls, Montana		
	2015	College of Saint Rose	Albany, New York		
**Mu Epsilon**		Arkansas State University	Jonesboro, Arkansas	Active	
		Chaminade University	Honolulu, Hawaii		
		Clemson University	Clemson, South Carolina	Active	
		Loyola Marymount University	Los Angeles, California	Active	
		Nova Southeastern University	Miami and Kendell, Florida		
		Rhoades College	Memphis, Tennessee		
		Rutgers University			
		Stevenson University	Baltimore County, Maryland	Active	
		University of Alabama	Tuscaloosa, Alabama	Active	
		University of Alabama in Huntsville	Huntsville, Alabama	Active	
		University of Arkansas at Little Rock	Little Rock, Arkansas		
		University of Central Florida	Orlando, Florida		
		University of Central Oklahoma	Edmond, Oklahoma		
		University of Detroit Mercy	Detroit, Michigan	Active	
		University of Michigan	Ann Arbor, Michigan	Active	
		University of Pittsburgh at Johnstown	Johnstown, Pennsylvania	Active	
		University of West Georgia	Carrollton, Georgia		
