= Professional Fraternity Association =

American association of national, collegiate, professional fraternities and sororities

- PFA
- Founded: 1978; 48 years ago Washington, D.C.
- Type: Umbrella
- Affiliation: Independent
- Status: Active
- Emphasis: Professional fraternities and sororities
- Scope: National
- Members: 25 fraternities active
- Predecessors: Professional Interfraternity Conference; Professional Panhellenic Association
- Headquarters: 6510 Telecom Drive, Suite 200; Indianapolis, Indiana 46278; United States
- Website: www.professionalfraternity.org

The Professional Fraternity Association (PFA) is an American association of national, collegiate, professional fraternities and sororities that was formed in 1978. Since PFA groups are discipline-specific, members join while pursuing graduate (law, medicine, etc.) degrees as well as undergraduate (business, engineering, etc.) degrees. PFA groups seek to develop their members professionally in addition to the social development commonly associated with Panhellenic fraternities. Membership requirements of the PFA are broad enough to include groups that do not recruit new members from a single professional discipline. The PFA has welcomed service and honor fraternities as members; however, Greek letter honor societies more commonly belong to the Association of College Honor Societies.

== History ==
The Professional Panhellenic Association (PPA), for women's groups, was founded in 1925, and the Professional Interfraternity Conference (PIC), for men's groups, was founded in 1928. These groups came about due to rapid growth among all types of fraternities during the late 1920s.

=== Professional Panhellenic Association ===
On June 26, 1925, representatives from fourteen professional fraternities for women attended an organizational meeting in Washington, D.C. During the summer a provisional constitution was ratified by the following eleven fraternities: Delta Omicron (music), Kappa Beta Pi (law), Omicron Nu (home economics), Phi Beta (music and speech), Phi Delta Pi (physical education), Phi Chi Theta (commerce), Phi Delta Delta (law), Phi Upsilon Omicron (home economics), Pi Lambda Theta (education), Sigma Sigma Sigma (education), and Theta Sigma Phi (journalism). Two additional fraternities, Sigma Alpha Iota (music) and Iota Sigma Pi (chemistry), soon ratified the constitution. The resulting thirteen member groups participated in the second annual conference on November 26, 1926. Originally known as Women's Professional Panhellenic Association until 1941, when the revised name was adopted.

=== Professional Interfraternity Conference ===
On March 2–3, 1928, delegates from 27 professional fraternities came together in Washington, D.C. to organize the PIC. Jarvis Butler of Sigma Nu Phi was elected as the first president, and Stroud Jordan of Alpha Chi Sigma was elected as the first Secretary-treasurer.

Groups represented were

- Accounting: Beta Alpha Psi
- Advertising: Alpha Delta Sigma
- Architecture: Alpha Rho Chi
- Chemistry: Alpha Chi Sigma
- Commerce: Alpha Kappa Psi, Delta Sigma Pi
- Dentistry: Alpha Omega, Psi Omega
- Education: Kappa Phi Kappa
- Engineering: Kappa Eta Kappa (Electrical), Theta Tau
- Forensic: Phi Delta Gamma
- General: Omicron Delta Kappa
- Law: Delta Theta Phi, Gamma Eta Gamma, Phi Alpha Delta, Phi Beta Gamma, Sigma Nu Phi
- Medicine: Omega Upsilon Phi, Phi Beta Pi, Phi Rho Sigma, Theta Kappa Psi
- Pharmacy: Kappa Psi, Phi Delta Chi
- Military: Scabbard and Blade
- Science: Chi Beta Phi

== Professional Fraternity Association ==
The PFA resulted from the merger of the Professional Interfraternity Conference and the Professional Panhellenic Association in 1978. The merger itself was the result of the impact of Title IX on most fraternal groups with professional affiliations.

Chartering organizations:

- Alpha Delta Theta – Medical Technology
- Alpha Kappa Psi – Business Administration
- Alpha Rho Chi – Architecture
- Alpha Tau Delta – Nursing
- Alpha Chi Sigma – Chemistry
- Alpha Omega – Dentistry
- Delta Theta Phi – Law
- Delta Omicron – Music
- Delta Sigma Delta – Dentistry
- Delta Sigma Pi – Business Administration
- Delta Psi Kappa – Physical Education
- Zeta Phi Eta – Communication Arts and Sciences
- Kappa Beta Pi – Law
- Kappa Delta Epsilon – Education
- Kappa Epsilon – Pharmacy
- Kappa Psi – Pharmacy
- Lambda Kappa Sigma – Pharmacy
- Mu Phi Epsilon – Music
- Xi Psi Phi – Dentistry
- Rho Pi Phi – Pharmacy
- Sigma Alpha Iota – Music
- Sigma Delta Kappa – Law
- Sigma Phi Delta – Engineering
- Phi Alpha Delta – Law
- Phi Beta – Music, Speech, Drama and Dance
- Phi Beta Pi-Theta Kappa Psi – Medical
- Phi Gamma Nu – Business
- Phi Delta Epsilon – Medical
- Phi Mu Alpha Sinfonia – Music
- Phi Rho Sigma – Medicine
- Phi Chi – Medicine
- Phi Chi Theta – Business and Economics
- Psi Omega – Dentistry
- Omega Tau Sigma – Veterinary Medicine

== Current members ==
Current membership of active members as of June 25, 2019.

Fraternity	Greek letters	Founded	Focus	Active collegiate groups	Collegiate charters granted	Initiates	PIC	PPA	PFA	Notes
Alpha Zeta	ΑΖ	November 4, 1897	Agriculture	30		116,000	Y	N	Y	Joined PIC prior to 1950
Alpha Kappa Psi	ΑΚΨ	October 5, 1904	Business	216	326	259,000	Y	N	Y	PIC Charterer, PFA Charterer
Alpha Rho Chi	ΑΡΧ	April 11, 1914	Architecture	33	43	5,500	Y	N	Y	PIC Charterer, PFA Charterer
Alpha Phi Omega	ΑΦΩ	December 16, 1925	Service	369	733	500,000	N	N	Y	
Alpha Chi Sigma	ΑΧΣ	December 11, 1902	Chemistry	49	97	65,000	Y	N	Y	PIC Charterer, PFA Charterer
Alpha Omega Epsilon	ΑΩΕ	November 13, 1983	Engineering	47	51	12,000	N	N	Y	
Delta Chi Xi	ΔΧΞ	November 12, 2013	Dance	7	8		N	N	Y	
Delta Epsilon Mu	ΔΕΜ	April 1996	Pre-health	34	39		N	N	Y	
Delta Theta Phi	ΔΘΦ	September 26, 1913	Law	150		125,000	Y	N	Y	PIC Charterer, Not member in 1933, PFA Charterer
Delta Kappa Alpha	ΔΚΑ	March 16, 1936	Cinema	12		9,000	N	N	Y	
Delta Omicron	ΔΟ	September 6, 1909	Music	37	129	27,000	N	Y	Y	PPA Charterer, PFA Charterer
Delta Sigma Pi	ΔΣΠ	November 7, 1907	Business	223	293	270,000	Y	N	Y	PIC Charterer, PFA Charterer
Delta Sigma Chi	ΔΣΧ	July 14, 1913	Chiropractic	10			N	N	Y	Joined 2016-2019
Epsilon Nu Tau	ΕΝΤ	April 18, 2008	Entrepreneurship	10			N	N	Y	Joined 2015
Theta Tau	ΘΤ	October 15, 1904	Engineering	50	58	30,000	Y	N	Y	PIC Charterer, member of PIC in 1968
Kappa Epsilon	ΚΕ	May 13, 1921	Pharmacy	43		24,400	N	Y	Y	Joined PPA March 23, 1951, Member of PPA in 1968, PFA Charterer
Kappa Eta Kappa	ΚΗΚ	February 10, 1923	Electrical engineering	3	9		Y	N	Y	PIC Charterer (rejoined 2016–2019)
Kappa Epsilon Psi	ΚΕΨ	April 4, 2011	Military	31			N	N	Y	Joined 2016-2019
Kappa Kappa Psi	ΚΚΨ	November 27, 1919	Band	196	313	66,000		N	Y	
Kappa Lambda Chi	ΚΛΧ	July 4, 2013	Military	26			N	N	Y	Joined 2016-2019
Kappa Psi	ΚΨ	May 30, 1879	Pharmacy	75	125	80,000	Y	N	Y	PIC Charterer, PFA Charterer
Lambda Kappa Sigma	ΛΚΣ	October 14, 1913	Pharmacy	31		30,000	N	Y	Y	Joined PPA in 1938, Member of PPA in 1968, PFA Charterer
Mu Beta Phi	ΜΒΦ	March 22, 2017	Military	21		500	N	N	Y	Joined 2016-2019
Mu Phi Epsilon	ΜΦΕ	November 13, 1903	Music	227		75,000	N	Y	Y	Member of PPA in 1953, Member of PPA in 1968, PFA Charterer
Pi Sigma Epsilon	ΠΣΕ	May 14, 1952	Marketing	58		60,000		N	Y	
Rho Pi Phi	ΡΠΦ	January 20, 1919	Pharmacy	8		10,000	Y	N	Y	Joined PIC in 1949, not a member in 1957, Member of PIC in 1968, PFA Charterer
Sigma Alpha	ΣΑ	January 26, 1978	Agriculture	68		4,000	N	N	Y	
Sigma Alpha Iota	ΣΑΙ	June 12, 1903	Music	220		105,376	N	Y	Y	PPA Charterer, PFA Charterer
Tau Beta Sigma	ΤΒΣ	March 26, 1946	Band	123	239	21,000	N		Y	
Phi Alpha Delta	ΦΑΔ	November 8, 1902	Law	717		260,000	Y	N	Y	PIC Charterer, Not member of PIC in 1933, member in 1950, PFA Charterer
Phi Beta	ΦΒ	May 5, 1912	Creative and performing arts	3	55	30,000	N	Y	Y	PPA Charterer, PFA Charterer
Phi Gamma Nu	ΦΓΝ	February 17, 1924	Business	10	115	35,000	N	Y	Y	Joined PPA in Early 1937. Member of PPA in 1940, Member of PPA in 1953, Member of PPA in 1968, PFA Charterer. Rejoined in 2013.
Phi Delta Epsilon	ΦΔΕ	October 13, 1904	Medicine	182		33,000	Y	N	Y	Joined PIC in 1928, member of PIC in 1968, PFA Charterer
Phi Delta Chi	ΦΔΧ	November 2, 1883	Pharmacy	103		43,000	Y	N	Y	PIC Charterer, member of PIC in 1968
Phi Sigma Pi	ΦΣΠ	February 14, 1916	Honors	135		31,000	Y	N	Y	Joined PIC in 1928
Phi Chi Theta	ΦΧΘ	June 16, 1924	Business	44		47,000	N	Y	Y	PPA Charterer, PFA Charterer
Hoo-Hoo International	Hoo-Hoos	January 21, 1892	Agriculture (Forestry)	51	283		N	N	Y	Affiliate Joined 2016-2019

== Former members ==
This includes the member organizations of the two former groups (PIC, PPA) that merged to form the PFA and organizations not currently active within the PFA.

Fraternity	Greek letters	Founded	Focus	Active collegiate groups	Collegiate charters granted	Initiates	PIC	PPA	PFA	Notes
Alpha Delta Theta	ΑΔΘ	February 1, 1944	Medical technology	23			N	Y	Y	Joined PPA in 1952, Member of PPA in 1968, PFA Charterer
Alpha Delta Sigma	ΑΔΣ	November 14, 1913	Advertising	72			Y	N	N	PIC Charterer, merged with Gamma Alpha Chi (similar for women) in 1969.
Alpha Kappa Kappa	ΑΚΚ	July 25, 1889	Medicine	3	60		Y	N	N	Joined PIC in 1928, member of PIC in 1968.
Alpha Sigma Alpha	ΑΣΑ	November 15, 1901	Education	170		120,000	N	Y	N	Joined PPA in early 1940. PPA membership alongside membership in Association of Education Sororities which was later merged with NPC. Withdrew from PPA, 1944.
Alpha Tau Delta	ΑΤΔ	February 15, 1921	Nursing	10	31	10,000	N	Y	Y	Member of PPA in 1947, Member of PPA in 1968, PFA Charterer
Alpha Omega	ΑΩ	December 20, 1907	Dentistry	125		15,000	Y	N	Y	PIC Charterer Joined PIC in 1954. PFA Charterer
Beta Alpha Psi	ΒΑΨ	February 12, 1919	Accounting	300			Y	N	N	PIC Charterer, now an honorary organization
Gamma Eta Gamma	ΓΗΓ	February 25, 1901	Law	1	33		Y	N	N	PIC Charterer, member of PIC in 1968.
Gamma Iota Sigma	ΓΙΣ	April 16, 1966	Insurance	97		13,000	N	N	Y	
Delta Epsilon Iota	ΔΕΙ	1994	Career Development	12 ?			N	N	Y	
Delta Sigma Delta	ΔΣΔ	November 15, 1882	Dentistry	33			Y	N	Y	Joined PIC in 1933, Member of PIC in 1968, PFA Charterer
Delta Psi Kappa	ΔΨΚ	October 23, 1916	Physical education	0	76		N	Y	Y	Member of PPA in 1940. Member of PPA in 1947, member of PPA in 1968, PFA Charterer; Merged with Phi Delta Pi in March 1970
Epsilon Eta Phi	ΕΗΦ	May 3, 1927	Commerce and business administration	0	7		N	Y	N	Member of PPA in 1953 (Not as of 1947), Member of PPA in 1968, Merged with Phi Chi Theta in 1973.
Zeta Phi Eta	ΖΦΗ	October 10, 1893	Communication arts and sciences	5			N	Y	Y	Member of PPA in 1940, Member of PPA in 1947, Member of PPA in 1968, PFA Charterer
Theta Kappa Psi	ΘΚΨ	May 30, 1879	Medicine	1	45		Y	N	Y	PIC Charterer individually, PFA Charterer as part of Phi Beta Pi-Theta Kappa Psi
Theta Sigma Upsilon	ΘΣΥ	March 25, 1921	Education	23			N	Y	N	PPA membership alongside membership in Association of Education Sororities which was later merged with NPC. Withdrew from PPA, 1944. Merged into Alpha Gamma Delta in 1959.
Theta Sigma Phi	ΘΣΦ	April 8, 1909	Journalism	0 ?	68		N	Y	N	PPA Charterer, member of PPA in 1968.
Iota Sigma Pi	ΙΣΠ	1902	Chemistry	23	46		N	Y	N	PPA Charterer, member of PPA in 1968.
Kappa Alpha Pi	ΚΑΠ	October 9, 2007	Law	13	13	800	N	N	Y	
Kappa Beta Pi	ΚΒΠ	December 15, 1908	Law	10 ?	83		N	Y	Y	PPA Charterer, PFA Charterer
Kappa Delta Epsilon	ΚΔΕ	March 25, 1933	Education	16		44,000	N	Y	Y	Member of PPA in 1953(Not as of 1947), member of PPA in 1968, PFA Charterer
Kappa Omicron Phi	ΚΟΦ	December 11, 1922	Home Economics	0	37		N	Y	N	Merged with Kappa Omicron Nu, now ACHS; Member of PPA in 1940.
Kappa Phi Kappa	ΚΦΚ	April 25, 1922	Education	1	60		Y	N	N	PIC Charterer
Nu Sigma Nu	ΝΣΝ	March 2, 1882	Medicine	3	37		Y	N	N	Joined PIC in 1933 In PIC in 1947
Xi Psi Phi	ΞΨΦ	February 8, 1889	Dentistry	19	63		Y	N	Y	Joined PIC in 1933, Member of PIC in 1968, PFA Charterer
Omicron Delta Kappa	ΟΔΚ	December 3, 1914	Leadership	300	418		Y	N	N	PIC Charterer, originally a men's leadership fraternity; now a co-ed honorary organization
Omicron Nu	ΟΝ	April 23, 1912	Home economics	0	22		N	Y	N	Merged into Kappa Omicron Nu, now ACHS; PPA Charterer
Pi Lambda Theta	ΠΛΘ	July 7, 1910	Education	?	?	185,000	N	Y	N	PPA Charterer, withdrew 1933
Sigma Delta Kappa	ΣΔΚ	August 8, 1914	Law	18 ?			Y	N	Y	Joined PIC in 1933, Member of PIC in 1968, PFA Charterer
Sigma Delta Chi	ΣΔΧ	April 17, 1909	Journalism	250			Y	N	N	Joined PIC in 1941.
Sigma Nu Phi	ΣΝΦ	February 12, 1903	Law	0	32	2,000	Y	N	N	PIC Charterer, not a PIC member in 1957; Merged into Delta Theta Phi in 1989.
Sigma Sigma Sigma	ΣΣΣ	April 20, 1898	Education	112		125,000	N	Y	N	Now NPC sorority PPA Charterer, PPA membership alongside membership in Association of Education Sororities which was later merged with National Panhellenic Conference. Withdrew from PPA, 1944.
Sigma Phi Delta	ΣΦΔ	April 11, 1924	Engineering	25	40	8,000	Y	N	Y	Joined PIC in 1929, Junior member as of 1933 Member of PIC in 1968, PFA charterer
Phi Beta Gamma	ΦΒΓ	April 24, 1922	Law	0	11	2,500	Y	N	N	PIC Charterer, member of PIC in 1968
Phi Beta Pi	ΦΒΠ	March 10, 1891	Medicine	1	35		Y	N	N	PIC Charterer individually, PFA Charterer as part of Phi Beta Pi-Theta Kappa Psi
Phi Delta Gamma	ΦΔΓ	June 7, 1924	Forensic	0			Y	N	N	PIC Charterer; Merged into Tau Kappa Alpha in 1935.
Phi Delta Delta	ΦΔΔ	November 11, 1911	Law	0	3		N	Y	N	PPA Charterer, merged with Phi Alpha Delta
Phi Delta Kappa	ΦΔΚ	January 24, 1906	Education	300 ?			Y	N	N	Joined PIC in 1928 Still member in 1947.
Phi Delta Pi	ΦΔΠ	October 23, 1916	Physical education	0			N	Y	N	PPA Charterer, member of PPA in 1968, merged with Delta Psi Kappa in March 1970.
Phi Delta Phi	ΦΔΦ	December 13, 1869	Law	131			Y	N	N	Joined PIC in 1938, member of PIC in 1968, became honor society in 2012.
Phi Epsilon Kappa	ΦΕΚ	April 12, 1913	Physical education	85			Y	N	N	Joined PIC in 1928, member of PIC in 1968
Phi Lambda Kappa	ΦΛΚ	1907	Medicine	41		4,800	Y	N	N	Joined PIC in 1938, member of PIC in 1968
Phi Mu Alpha Sinfonia	ΦΜΑ Sinfonia	October 6, 1898	Music	249			Y	N	Y	Joined PIC in 1954, PFA Charterer, left the PFA on August 13, 2007, reverted to its historical founding as a social fraternity.
Phi Rho Sigma	ΦΡΣ	October 31, 1890	Medicine	9	47	33,000	Y	N	Y	PIC Charterer, PFA Charterer
Phi Upsilon Omicron	ΦΥΟ	February 10, 1909	Home Economics	61			N	Y	N	PPA Charterer
Phi Chi	ΦΧ	March 31, 1889	Medicine	16			Y	N	Y	Joined PIC in 1928, member of PIC in 1968, PFA Charterer
Chi Beta Phi	ΧΒΦ	April 1916	Science	26			Y	N	N	PIC Charterer
Psi Omega	ΨΩ	June 8, 1892	Dentistry	27	68		Y	N	Y	PIC Charterer, PFA Charterer
Omega Tau Sigma	ΩΤΣ	1906	Veterinary	12		8,000	Y	N	Y	Joined PIC in 1956, member of PIC in 1968, PFA Charterer, rejoined 2015 Left PFA 2016-2019
Omega Upsilon Phi	ΩΥΦ	November 15, 1894	Medicine	0			Y	N	N	PIC Charterer, Merged with Phi Beta Pi in 1934
Pershing Rifles	Pershing Rifles	October 2, 1894	Military sciences	60			N	N	Y	Left 2016-2019
Scabbard and Blade	Scabbard and Blade	1904 (Fall)	Military	?			Y	N	N	PIC Charterer
Scarab	Scarab	February 25, 1909	Architecture	?	16		Y	N	N	PIC Charterer, Left PIC in 1937/1938

== Notes ==
- Note 1: PIC Charterer indicates participation in the "Preparatory Conference" at the Hamilton Hotel, Washington, D.C., on March 2 and 3, 1928.
- Note 2: PPA Charterer indicates ratification of the provisional constitution of the PPA by the Second Annual Conference on November 26, 1926.
- Note 3: PFA Charterer indicates membership in good standing in the PPA or PIC at the time of the merger and thus by the agreement of the joint conference in October 1977, charter members.
- Note 4: Membership in 1968 only included in notes if group was not a charterer for both PPA/PIC and PFA.
