= Mu Beta Phi =

International military fraternity

- ΜΒΦ
- Founded: March 22, 2017; 8 years ago Columbia, South Carolina
- Type: Professional
- Affiliation: PFA
- Status: Active
- Emphasis: Military, African American
- Scope: International
- Motto: Unitas de concordis
- Pillars: Mission, Brotherhood, Professionalism
- Colors: California Blue, old gold, black, and white
- Flower: Golden calla lily
- Mascot: Golden eagle
- Patron Greek deity: Hercules
- Publication: Eagle's Nest Newsletter
- Chapters: 26
- Colonies: 7
- Members: 1,076 lifetime
- Nickname: The Mighty Beta Kings
- Headquarters: 6819 Castlewood Circle; Suffolk, Virginia 23435-3021; United States
- Website: www.mbphikings2017.org

Mu Beta Phi Military Fraternity, Inc. (ΜΒΦ) is an international military fraternity. It was established in Columbia, South Carolina in 2017 and has established 26 chapters in the United States and Asia.

== History ==
Mu Beta Phi was founded as an African American military fraternity by three active duty and retired military men on March 22, 2017. The fraternity's founders were Gary V. Ammons (Navy), Darrin Coney (Air Force), and Clifton Powell (Army). The first class of members, known as the Hercules PHIrst Warriors, were Antonio Brown, Murad Dixon, Timothy Hall, Efferen Hernandez, Leander Holston Jr., Marquette Jones, Lugene Johnson, Shawn Ollison, Jeremiah Thompson, and Jason Williams.

Mu Beta Phi Military Fraternity, Inc. was incorporated on April 17, 2017. Its purpose is "strengthening the local and veteran communities, restoring faith in the veteran communities, and broadening the knowledge of our veterans we serve."

Mu Beta Phi is a member of the Professional Fraternity Association (PFA), in the category of military science. The fraternity received the Outstanding Community Service Award from the Professional Fraternity Association in 2021. Also in 2021, Ammons received PFA's Outstanding Community Leader award. By April 2022, it had chartered fourteen chapters.

As of August 2025, Mu Beta Phi has initiated 1,076 members and has chartered 26 chapters. Its headquarters is in Suffolk, Virginia.

== Symbols ==
The Mu Beta Phi motto is Unitas de concordis. Its principles or pillars are mission, brotherhood, and professionalism. The fraternity's colors are California blue, old gold, black, and white. Its flower is the golden calla lily. Its mascot is Hercules and its animal is the golden eagle. Its nickname is "The Mighty Beta Kings".

Its publication is the Eagle's Nest Newsletter.

== Activities ==
Mu Beta Phi's activities include personal growth, networking, and community service. The fraternity holds a national leadership conference.

Its service projects include fighting veteran homelessness and supporting military children. Its programs include the Backpack & School Supply Giveaway and the Mighty Mentors, that works with boys ages eight to thirteen. It also provides mentoring and support services for veterans who are transitioning from active duty to civilian life. Its Day of Service mobilizes veterans in thirteen states for service projects.

During the COVID-19 pandemic, the fraternity's membership distributed personal protective equipment across the United States and provided meals to at-risk people in five states. In 2021, fraternity members collected supplies for Afghan refugees. In July 2023, the fraternity participated in a Family Readiness Festival coordinated by the 353rd Civil Affairs Command Soldier Family Readiness Group in New York.

== Chapters ==
Mu Beta Phi refers to its chapters as royal courts. Colonies are referred to as courts. In the following list, active courts are noted in bold, and inactive courts are in italics.

Chapter	Charter date and range	Institution	Location	Status	Ref.
**Alpha**	April 24, 2018		Hampton Roads, Virginia	Active	
Beta				Memorial	
**Gamma**	March 22, 2019		Philadelphia, Pennsylvania	Active	
**Delta**	2018		Columbia, South Carolina	Active	
**Epsilon**	July 2021		St. Louis, Illinois	Active	
**Zeta**	October 17, 2020		Washington, D.C.	Active	
**Eta**	July 2021		Jacksonville, Florida	Active	
**Theta**	November 15, 2020		Atlanta, Georgia	Active	
**Iota**	2024		Charlotte, North Carolina	Colony	
**Kappa**	July 2021		Dallas-Fort Worth, Texas	Active	
**Lambda**	July 14, 2021		San Diego, California	Active	
**Nu**	July 2021		New York City, New York	Active	
**Xi**	July 2021		Las Vegas, Nevada	Active	
**Omicron**	2021		Gulfport, Mississippi	Active	
**Pi**	2021		Houston, Texas	Active	
**Rho**	2023		Texas	Colony	
**Sigma**	2023		Manhattan, New York	Active	
**Tau**	2022		Cleveland, Ohio	Active	
**Upsilon**	2023		Corpus Christi, Austin, and San Antonio, Texas	Active	
**Chi**	2023		Chicago, Illinois	Active	
**Psi**	2023		Macon, Georgia	Active	
**Omega**	2023		San Francisco, California	Active	
**Alpha Alpha**	2024		Tampa, Florida	Active	
**Alpha Gamma**	2022		Bahrain	Colony	
**Alpha Delta**	2022		Southeast Asia	Active	
**Alpha Epsilon**	2025		Denver Colorado	Active	
**Alpha Zeta**	2025		Columbia, South Carolina	Active	
**Alpha Phi**	May 2, 2019	Norfolk State University	Norfolk, Virginia	Active	

== See also ==
- Professional fraternities and sororities
- Service fraternities and sororities
