= Delta Omicron =

International honor fraternity for music

- ΔΟ
- Founded: September 6, 1909; 117 years ago Cincinnati Conservatory of Music
- Type: Professional
- Affiliation: PFA; National Interfraternity Music Council (NIMC)
- Former affiliation: PPA
- Status: Active
- Scope: International
- Motto: Continenter nitentes consequimur "Continually striving, we attain."
- Colors: Old Rose and Pearl Gray
- Symbol: Lyre
- Flower: Lily of the Valley
- Chapters: 37 active, 183 total
- Headquarters: 910 Church Street; Jefferson City, Tennessee 37760; United States
- Website: www.delta-omicron.org

Delta Omicron (ΔΟ) is a co-ed international professional music honors fraternity whose mission is to promote and support excellence in music and musicianship.

== History ==
Delta Omicron International Music Fraternity was founded on September 6, 1909 at the Cincinnati Conservatory of Music by three undergraduate students: Hazel Wilson, Lorena Creamer, and Mabel Dunn. Additional charter members included Mae Chenoweth, Grace Hudson, and Adah H. Appell. The Articles of Incorporation were signed by the charter members on December 8, 1909 and filed in the office of the Secretary of State of Ohio. The charter was granted on December 13, 1909. In 1923, this date was established as "Founders Day" since not all collegiate institutions at which chapters were installed had opened for the fall semester by September 6.

Originally called "Delta Omicron Sorority," the organization changed its name to "Delta Omicron Fraternity" in 1947 since "fraternity" was the preferred name in Panhellenic circles. The fraternity has collegiate chapters established throughout the United States. Several chapters were established abroad, but are currently inactive. Delta Omicron is the only organization of its kind, since it was founded by students for students and is also the only professional music fraternity founded by underclassmen. Originally an all-female organization, Delta Omicron first initiated men in 1979 after changing the bylaws to admit men in 1977.

Since late 2021 and early 2022, with the development of the ongoing COVID-19 pandemic with new variants and its increased spread, the organization name has been confused with the Delta and Omicron variants of COVID-19. This has sometimes caused adverse reactions on some campuses in some cases, such as recruiting new members and promotional materials (especially those that spell out the full greek letters in their name), along with other greek organizations that share letters or names with those of COVID variants, which also were at least partly impacted by these effects.

== Symbols ==
The motto of Delta Omicron is Continenter nitentes consequimur or "Continually striving, we attain." Its colors are old rose and pearly gray. Its symbol is the lyre. Its flower is the lily of the valley.

== Delta Omicron Foundation, Inc. ==
The Delta Omicron Foundation, Inc. was founded on June 17, 1958. and is chartered in Ohio as a nonprofit organization. The Foundation was granted tax-exempt status on March 27, 1964. The Foundation administers the philanthropies of Delta Omicron as a separate corporation. It supports and promotes music and musicians through educational grants and scholarships for music study, the commission of composers, awards for musical accomplishments, subsidies for publications and programs promoting music, and national and international music endeavors. It also supplements Delta Omicron's endowment fund, which was established in 1927.

== Membership ==
Membership is determined on the basis of talent, scholarship, and character and is open to collegiate music students enrolled in schools where Delta Omicron chapters are located, to music faculty members in those schools, and to professional musicians. Over 28,000 members have been initiated. The first honorary memberships were offered to women musicians of "national reputation" in 1916.

A member affiliated with a collegiate chapter (either undergraduate or graduate) must be a music major, music minor, or the equivalent of a music minor (as determined by individual chapters).

Delta Omicron was the first music fraternity to establish chapters abroad. International chapters of Delta Omicron are those that are established outside of the boundaries of the United States, the first of which was established in South Korea on June 7, 1958. Members of an international chapter may be made up of collegiate or alumni members.

== Chapters ==
Delta Omicron has a total of 183 chapters and clubs. Of the 129 collegiate chapters that have been established in the United States, 37 are active. Collegiate chapters are chartered in accredited institutions of higher learning and derive their names from the Greek alphabet in the regular sequence according to the date of installation.

Alumni chapters derive their names by using the name of the nearest collegiate chapter prefixed by the letter Zeta. Alumni chapters adopted Greek letter names beginning in 1944. Of the 46 alumni chapters and clubs that have been established in the United States, fifteen are active.

Eight chapters - seven collegiate and one alumni - were established in South Korea, due largely to the work of Lenore Harpster Lutz, who traveled to the country with her husband, a missionary. All are currently inactive. International collegiate chapters derive their names from the Greek alphabet, prefixed by the letter Kappa.

== Publications ==
The Wheel: Educational Journal of Delta Omicron is the official publication of the fraternity. The journal began publication with volume 1 in June 1915. The Wheel was published annually from 1915 to 1923, semiannually 1924 to 1925, triennially 1926 to 1929, and quarterly since 1930. The editor seeks articles on information related to the fraternity, its members and patrons, collegiate and alumni chapters, special events, awards, and music-related articles of interests to musicians. It is distributed to all current members of the fraternity.

The Whistle of Delta Omicron International Music Fraternity—Alumni Newsletter is the official publication of the fraternity for alumni-at-large. The international newsletter began publication with volume 1 in 1952 and is geared to the interests of alumni-at-large members. It was originally distributed to all alumni members of the fraternity annually via mail, however, since January 2004, it has been published online on the Delta Omicron website.

== Notable members ==
A National Honorary Member, recognized as such by the National Board of Directors, is a musician who has attained outstanding recognition in the field.

The title of "Patron" or "Patroness" may be conferred upon a musician who has attained a national reputation in his or her field. The title may also be conferred upon a nationally recognized patron of music.

Citations are presented by the National Board of Directors to individuals or corporations whose support of music or the arts is deemed worthy of recognition.

== National affiliations ==
Delta Omicron is affiliated with the following organizations: American Classical Music Hall of Fame, American String Teachers Association, College Fraternity Editors Association (CFEA), Music Educators National Conference (MENC), Music Teachers National Association, National American Inter-fraternal Foundation (NIF), National Association of Schools of Music (NASM), National Federation of Music Clubs (NFMC), National Interfraternity Music Council, National Music Council, Professional Fraternity Association (of which it was a charter member), and the Support Music, Music Education Coalition.

Delta Omicron established and has maintained a studio at MacDowell Colony since 1928.
