= Epsilon Nu Tau =

American college fraternity for entrepreneurship

- ΕΝΤ
- Founded: April 18, 2008; 18 years ago University of Dayton
- Type: Professional
- Affiliation: PFA
- Status: Active
- Emphasis: Entrepreneurship
- Scope: National
- Motto: Laurus Pariter "Succeed Together"
- Colors: Green and Aqua
- Chapters: 5 active
- Headquarters: Dayton, Ohio; United States
- Website: epsilonnutau.org

Epsilon Nu Tau (ΕΝΤ) is a professional co-educational college fraternity for students interested in entrepreneurship. It was established at the University of Dayton in 2008 and has expanded to 21 universities in the United States.

== History ==
Epsilon Nu Tau was founded on April 18, 2008, by seven students at the University of Dayton. It was founded by seven students, including James Wolf who was its first president. Its purpose is to promote ethics in business and to teach its members professionalism.

The fraternity started as a coeducational group with forty members. From the beginning, its members planned on adding additional chapters. The Beta chapter was added at Texas State University in 2010. This was followed by Gamma at California State University, Fullerton and Delta at Seton Hall University, also in 2010.

Epsilon Nu Tau joined the Professional Fraternity Association in 2015.

== Symbols ==
The Epsilon Nu Tau mottos is the Latin phrase, Laurus Pariter or "[We] succeed together." The fraternity's colors are green and aqua.

== Membership ==
The fraternity is open to students of all majors. It is coed.

== Chapters ==
Following is a list of the chapters of Epsilon Nu Tau. Active chapters are noted in bold, and inactive groups are noted in italics.

Chapter	Chapter date and range	Institution	City or county	State	Status	Reference
**Alpha**	April 18, 2008	University of Dayton	Dayton	Ohio	Active	
Beta	January 24, 2010 – 2022	Texas State University	San Marcos	Texas	Inactive	
Gamma	September 11, 2010 – 200x ?	California State University, Fullerton	Fullerton	California	Inactive	
Delta	September 29, 2010 – 200x ?	Seton Hall University	South Orange	New Jersey	Inactive	
Epsilon	June 1, 2011 – 200x ?	Ohio University	Athens	Ohio	Inactive	
Zeta	July 25, 2012 – 200x ?	Ohio State University	Columbus	Ohio	Inactive	
Eta	April 29, 2013 – 200x ?	Central Michigan University	Mount Pleasant	Michigan	Inactive	
Theta	Spring 2014–200x ?	Purdue University	West Lafayette	Indiana	Inactive	
Iota	2014–200x ?	University of Michigan	Ann Arbor	Michigan	Inactive	
**Kappa**	April 11, 2016	James Madison University	Harrisonburg	Virginia	Active	
Lambda		Kennesaw State University	Kennesaw	Georgia		
Mu		Fort Hays State University	Hays	Kansas		
Nu	January 16, 2017 – 200x ?	DePaul University	Chicago	Illinois	Inactive	
Xi						
Omicron		Valparaiso University	Valparaiso	Indiana		
Pi	201x ?–201x ?	University of Alabama at Birmingham	Birmingham	Alabama	Inactive	
Rho						
Sigma		Washington University in St. Louis	St. Louis County	Missouri		
**Tau**	2020	Cornell University	Ithaca	New York	Active	
**Upsilon**	January 2021	Indiana University	Bloomington	Indiana	Active	
**Phi**	March 2022	University of Texas	Austin	Texas	Active	

== National conferences ==
- 2nd - Texas State University, November 18–19, 2011
- 3rd - California State University Fullerton, April 19–21, 2013
- 4th - Seton Hall University, April 11–13, 2014
- 5th - Central Michigan University, April 10–12, 2015
- 6th - Purdue University, April 21–24, 2016
- 7th - Indiana University, April 12–14, 2024

== See also ==
- Professional fraternities and sororities
