= Pre-health sciences =

Pre-Health Sciences are the undergraduate courses that prepare American college students for admission in medical, dentistry, pharmacy, optometry, veterinary, and physical therapy schools, and for training as a physician assistant. In the United States, colleges have moved away from the impractical designation of students as "Pre-med" majors, as only a small percentage of applicants actually achieve admission into medical schools. As such, students are given the choice to focus on the coursework required for admission.

== Standard Pre-Health courses ==
Students focusing on Pre-Health can major in any subject; however, they will also take a broad range of science courses including general chemistry and organic chemistry, often earning a minor in chemistry, mathematics, often up to basic calculus, general biology with overviews of genetics and taxonomy, and calculus or trigonometry-based physics.

The requirements beyond the sciences are often light, many schools require a human sciences or psychology course. No schools actually require anatomy or diagnostic courses as these are universally regarded as first year medical courses.

== See also ==
- Pre-medical, for the general requirements for admission to US medical schools
