= Phi Delta Gamma (professional) =

American forensics fraternity (1924–1935)

- ΦΔΓ
- Founded: June 7, 1924; 102 years ago College of William and Mary
- Type: Professional
- Former affiliation: PFA
- Status: Merged
- Merge date: 1935
- Successor: Tau Kappa Alpha
- Emphasis: Forensics
- Scope: National (US)
- Publication: The Literary Scroll
- Chapters: 13
- Headquarters: United States

Phi Delta Gamma (ΦΔΓ) was an American professional fraternity in the field of forensics. It was established in 1924 at the College of William & Mary from a merger of various local literary societies. It was a founding member of the Professional Interfraternity Conference in 1928, It merged into Tau Kappa Alpha in 1935.

== History ==
Phi Delta Gamma was founded on June 7, 1924, at the College of William & Mary, combining local literary societies from the University of Iowa, Georgetown University School of Law, the University of Minnesota, the University of Illinois, Ohio University, George Washington University, and the University of Southern California. It wasa professional fraternity in the field of forensics. Its founders were members of a committee that was organized after a 1922 meeting held in Urbana, Illinois.

The founders of Phi Delta Gamma were:

- William O. Moore, State University of Iowa
- George O. Hurley, State University of Iowa
- Kenneth E. Oberholtzer, University of Illinois
- Dean William A. Hamilton, College of William and Mary
- Russell D. Tubaugh, Ohio University
- Paul A. Lomax, University of Southern California
- William Waldo Girdner, George Washington University
- Carl E. Anderson, University of Minnesota.

The fraternity's purpose was to "maintain and stimulate a greater interest in the work of literary societies, debate clubs, and dramatic organizations in colleges and universities and to foster the upbuilding of literary societies."

Phi Delta Gamma was a founding member of the Professional Interfraternity Conference in 1928. Phi Delta Gamma merged into Tau Kappa Alpha in 1935.

== Symbols ==
The fraternity's badge was illustrated in Baird's Manual as a diamond shape with an enameled center that featured a scroll with the Greek letters "ΦΔΓ" on it in the diagonal, from the left corner of the scroll to the bottom right corner. There was a star above and below the scroll.

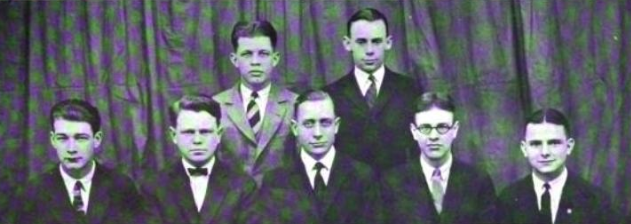
Phi Delta Gamma University of Minnesota, 1924

== Membership ==
Phi Delta Gamma's members included male undergraduates, graduate students, and faculty. Membership was through a pledging and initiation process, with new members being elected based on debating experience, qualities of scholarship, and interest in literary events. The fraternity also awarded honorary memberships.

== Activities ==
Phi Delta Gamma pursued intersociety rather than intercollegiate forensics. Its activities included debates and forensic contests, awarding silver loving cups to members of the winning team. The DC Alpha chapter awarded a silver loving cup annually to winner of a freshman oratory contest, while he CA Alpha chapter awarded a loving cup annually for the best speech in the state. The VA Alpha chapter purchased three gold medals to be awarded annually for "unusual merit" to a men and women in forensics and either a man or woman for dramatics at the College of William & Mary. The society's members also organized guest speakers and social events such as an annual banquet.

The fraternity's magazine was The Literary Scroll

== Governance ==
Chapters elected the following officers: president, vice president, secretary, and treasurer; some chapters had a sergeant-at-arms and chaplain.

== Chapters ==
Following is a list of the chapters of Phi Delta Gamma, with inactive chapters indicated in italics. (Note: Names are likely, but conjectural. The Minnesota chapter listing is mentioned in Minnesota Gopher yearbooks as the MN Alpha chapter of the fraternity.)

| Chapter | Charter date and range | Institution | Location | Status | Ref. |
|---|---|---|---|---|---|
| IA Alpha | June 4, 1924 – 1935 | Iowa State University | Ames, Iowa | Merged (ΤΚΑ) | |
| OH Alpha | June 4, 1924 – 1935 | Ohio University | Athens, Ohio | Merged (ΤΚΑ) | |
| CA Alpha | June 4, 1924 – 1935 | University of Southern California | Los Angeles, California | Merged (ΤΚΑ) | |
| DC Alpha | June 4, 1924 – 1935 | George Washington University | Washington, D.C. | Merged (ΤΚΑ) | |
| VA Alpha | June 4, 1924 – 1935 | College of William & Mary | Williamsburg, Virginia | Merged (ΤΚΑ | |
| MN Alpha | June 4, 1924 – 1935 | University of Minnesota | Minneapolis | Merged (ΤΚΑ) | |
| IL Alpha | March 3, 1925 – 1935 | University of Illinois | Urbana, Illinois | Merged (ΤΚΑ) | (Note: Sources indicate this chapter was founding chapter, established before June 1924. However, it was not authorized as a campus organization until March 3, 1925.) |
| AL Alpha | March 22, 1925 – 1935 | Auburn University | Auburn, Alabama | Merged (ΤΚΑ) | |
| TX Alpha | 1925–1935 | University of Texas | Austin, Texas | Merged (ΤΚΑ) | |
| IL Beta | April 9, 1927 – 1935 | Northwestern University | Evanston, Illinois | Merged (ΤΚΑ) | |
| OH Beta | 1927–1935 | Ohio State University | Columbus, Ohio | Merged (ΤΚΑ) | |
| IN Alpha | May 16, 1928 – 1935 | Indiana University | Bloomington, Indiana | Merged (ΤΚΑ) | |
| IA Beta | 19xx ?–19xx ? | University of Iowa | Iowa City, Iowa | Inactive | |

== Notable members ==
- Theodore F, Koop (IA Alpha) – vice president of CBS. editor for the Associated Press and director of National Geographic's news service
- Lee Loevinger (MN Alpha) – jurist, lawyer, and commissioner of the Federal Communications Commission
- Norman Shumway (MN Alpha) – a pioneer of heart surgery

== See also ==
- College literary societies
- Debate
- Professional fraternities and sororities
