= Lambda Kappa Sigma =

International women's pharmacy group

- ΛΚΣ
- Founded: October 14, 1913; 113 years ago Massachusetts College of Pharmacy
- Type: Professional
- Affiliation: PFA
- Former affiliation: PPA
- Status: Active
- Emphasis: Pharmacy
- Scope: International
- Motto: Esse Quam Videri "To be, rather than to seem"
- Colors: Old gold and Columbia blue
- Symbol: Caduceus
- Flower: Yellow Chrysanthemum
- Mascot: Lamb
- Patron Greek deity: Hygieia
- Publication: The Blue and Gold Triangle and LinKS
- Philanthropy: Project Hope
- Chapters: 29 collegiate, 17 alumni
- Members: 30,000+ lifetime
- Headquarters: S77 W16906 Casey Drive; Muskego, Wisconsin 53150; United States
- Website: www.lks.org

Lambda Kappa Sigma (ΛΚΣ or LKS) is an international pharmacy fraternity headquartered in Muskego, Wisconsin. Founded in 1913, it was created to promote the profession of pharmacy among women and advance women within the profession. LKS is the oldest and largest professional pharmacy fraternity for women in the world. Lambda Kappa Sigma has initiated more than 30,000 members and has 45 chartered chapters. It also has 36 chartered alumni groups internationally.

== History ==
On October 14, 1913, Ethel J. Heath and eight other female students at the Massachusetts College of Pharmacy organized Lambda Kappa Society, a social club. Charter members were:

- Ethel J. Heath
- Annabel Carter Jones
- Mary Connolly Livingston
- Emma MacDonnell Cronin
- Willette McKeever Cheever
- Mary Durgin Loveland
- Alice G. Coleman
- Margaret M. Curran
- Rosemond A. Guinn.

In 1915, the organization ceased being a luncheon club and was opened to all female members of the college. Sigma was added to the name, formally making it Lambda Kappa Sigma, and the official badge, motto, flower, and colors were selected. In 1919, the official coat of arms, designed by Cora E. Craven, was adopted.

The first national convention was held in Boston, Massachusetts in 1926, beginning a biennial convention schedule. At this convention, the Eta chapter presented what became the fraternity's official prayer, and Delta chapter presented what became the official sorority song. Both the prayer and the song were adopted for national use in 1950.

The Silver Anniversary Convention was held in Boston, Massachusetts, in 1938. At that convention, the delegates voted to join the Professional Panhellenic Association, becoming the first pharmaceutical sorority in the PPA. On April 28, 1956, ΛΚΣ became international with the addition of the Alpha Lambda chapter in Vancouver, British Columbia, Canada on the campus of the University of British Columbia. In 1980 an international office was established, with the addition of an executive director position in 1984.

The 1982 biennial convention was held at Pittsburgh, Pennsylvania, with the Delta chapter (University of Pittsburgh), Tau chapter (Duquesne University), and Tau Alumni as hosts. The 1996 biennial convention was held in St. Louis, Missouri, with the Alpha Zeta and Alpha Zeta Alumni chapters as hosts.

During the 1988 biennial convention, the members voted to delete all gender references from the fraternity's membership requirements. The fraternity was now open to both male and female members, following a twelve-year battle to legally remain a fraternity for women only.

== Symbols ==
Lambda Kappa Sigma's motto is Esse Quam Videri or "To be, rather than to seem". Its colors are old gold and Columbia blue. Its symbol is the Caduceaus. Its mascot is the lamb and its flower is the yellow chrysanthemum. Its patron Greek deity is Hygieia.

Its publication is the Blue and Gold Triangle, established 1926. It also publishes LinKS for student chapters and their advisors.

== Philanthropy ==
In 1964, Project Hope was adopted as the fraternity's international philanthropy. Lambda Kappa Sigma also has an educational grant program.

== Chapters ==
Lambda Kappa Sigma has twenty active collegiate chapters and seventeen active alumni chapters.

== See also ==
- Professional fraternities and sororities
- Rho Chi, co-ed, pharmacy honor society
