= Alpha Kappa Kappa =

North American medical fraternity

- ΑΚΚ
- Coat of Arms of Alpha Kappa Kappa
- Founded: September 29, 1888; 138 years ago Dartmouth College
- Type: Professional
- Affiliation: Independent
- Former affiliation: PIC
- Status: Defunct
- Emphasis: Medical
- Scope: North America
- Member badge
- Colors: Dartmouth Green; White
- Symbol: Twin serpents, book
- Jewel: Emerald and Pearl
- Publication: The Centaur
- Chapters: 66 chartered
- Members: 35,000+ (as of 1977) lifetime
- Headquarters: United States

Alpha Kappa Kappa (ΑΚΚ) was a North American medical school fraternity. It was founded in 1888 at Dartmouth Medical School in Hanover, New Hampshire.The fraternity had over sixty chapters at various medical schools throughout the United States and Canada for approximately eighty years before going defunct. Three of its former chapters continued to operate as location organizations after the fraternity's dissolution; two are still active as of 2025.

== History ==
Alpha Kappa Kappa was established at Dartmouth Medical School in Hanover, New Hampshire on September 29, 1888. It was created for "social intercourse, mental development, scholarship, and mutual assistance." The fraternity was incorporated in New Hampshire by a special act of the legislature on July 25, 1889.

The fraternity expanded to be national and international, with chapters across the United States and in Canada. Its national headquarters was in Ellettsville, Indiana. It was a member of the Professional Interfraternity Conference, a predecessor to the Professional Fraternity Association.

The fraternity disbanded nationally in the 1960s, with three chapters continuing as independent organizations.

=== Alpha Kappa Kappa local ===
Alpha Theta chapter at the University of Texas Medical Branch stayed active until the mid-2000s.

The Epsilon chapter at Jefferson Medical College is still active. It has a chapter house at 317 South Eleventh Street in Philadelphia, Pennsylvania. It provides affordable housing for male medical students.

Alpha Psi chapter at the University of Iowa also stayed active after the disbanding of the national fraternity. Now called the Alpha Kappa Kappa Society, it operates as a residential community with a chapter house at 339 Teeter Court in Iowa City, purchased in 1925. The chapter went co-ed in the 1990s. It has an Alumni Board that was established in 2019.

== Symbols ==
The Alpha Kappa Kappa badge was a gold crescent with the Greek letters "ΑΚΚ" enameled in black. Wrapped around the crescent are twin coiled serpents facing each other. The horns of the crescent support an enameled black book bearing the letter(s) of the chapter. (In the infobox, a photographic example shows a pin from the Mu chapter at the University of Pennsylvania.) The book may be set in pearls and emeralds, which were the fraternity's jewels. The name of the school was sometimes etched onto the side of the book, which was held at a diagonal.

The colors of the fraternity were Dartmouth green and white, to honor its founding school. Its symbols were the book and the twin serpents. Its quarterly magazine was The Centaur.

== Chapters ==
Alpha Kappa Kappa charted 68 chapters before going inactive.

== Notable members ==
- Edward Starr Judd Jr. (Alpha Rho) – surgeon and Mayo Clinic founder and partner
- Charles H. Mayo (Psi) – physician and Mayo Clinic founder

== See also ==
- Professional fraternities and sororities
