= Phi Beta =

International fraternity for performing arts

- ΦΒ
- Founded: May 5, 1912; 114 years ago Northwestern University
- Type: Professional
- Affiliation: PFA; National Interfraternity Music Council (NIMC)
- Former affiliation: PPA
- Status: Active
- Emphasis: Music, Art, Drama, Dance, Speech, and Creative Writing
- Scope: National (formerly International)
- Motto: "To be rather to seem to be"
- Colors: Violet and Gold
- Symbol: Baton
- Flower: Yellow rose
- Publication: The Baton
- Chapters: 1 collegiate, 5 alumni
- Colonies: 1
- Members: 13,000+ lifetime
- Headquarters: 5710 Wooster Pike #204; Cincinnati, Ohio 45227; United States
- Website: phibeta.org

Phi Beta Fraternity (ΦΒ) is an American professional collegiate fraternity for the creative and performing arts. It was founded in 1912 at Northwestern University in Evanston, Illinois. Phi Beta is gender inclusive and incorporates all art forms into its membership. It is a founding member of the Professional Fraternity Association.

== History ==
Phi Beta Fraternity began as a local club at Northwestern University in Evanston, Illinois, on May 5, 1912. It was established as a women's professional fraternity for music and speech. Its three founders were Gladys Burnside, Josephine Mack, and Elsie Schultz.

The fraternity was incorporated in the State of Illinois in 1914. Phi Beta organized its first residence, renting a house at 1928 Sherman Avenue in Evanston, Illinois.

In 1915, Phi Beta petitioned the women's social fraternity Alpha Delta Pi for a charter. Because most of Phi Beta's members were enrolled in professional two- or three-year coursework, as opposed to traditional four-year programs, that petition was denied. Also in 1915, a group of women at the Chicago Conservatory petitioned to become a chapter of Phi Beta Fraternity; Beta chapter was installed on July 17, 1917.

Helen Rowan served as Phi Beta's first national president. Phi Beta's first convention was held in the spring of 1918 in Chicago, Illinois. The fraternity became a member of the Professional Panhellenic Association when that group formed in 1925.

By 1963, the fraternity had chartered 41 chapters (31 actives) and had 34 alumni chapters, with more than 13,000 members.

In 1974 and 1975, its chapters voted to become co-ed, prompted by Title IX. Today, Phi Beta is gender inclusive. In 1978, Phi Beta became a founding member of the Professional Fraternity Association (PFA), with Phi Beta member Mary Ellin Frohmader serving as the first president of PFA.

Phi Beta is also affiliated with the Fraternity Communication Association (FCA) and the National Interfraternity Music Council (NIMC). It was a member of the American Educational Theatre Association, Music Educators' National Conference, the National Federation of Music Clubs, the American Educational Theatre Association, and the Speech Association of America.

== Symbols ==
Phi Beta's badge is a monogram of the Greek letters ΦΒ; the outside of the Φ can be set with pearls and its bar can be set with pearls or diamonds. The fraternity's pledge pin is a small gold Φ. The fraternity also has a recognition pin, in the shape of a gold laurel wreath that has a baton through it middle.

Phi Beta's colors are violet and gold. Violet represents sincerity and gold symbolizes success. Its flower is the yellow rose, tied by a violet ribbon. Symbolically, the rose and ribbon reflect the fraternity's colors, but are also intended to represent "joy, friendship, and new beginnings." Its motto is "To be rather to seem to be". Its quarterly publication is The Baton.

== Membership ==
In the beginning, the fraternity limited its membership to women majoring in music and speech. Over time, the fraternity has grown to embrace all of the creative and performing arts and their related therapies and histories, marking this broader acceptance of art students instead of only fine arts, or only dance.

== Philanthropy ==
Annually, Phi Beta awards scholarships to its collegiate members and grants to its alumni members.

Phi Beta has completed several national projects including: enlarging by hand sheet music for the visually impaired, service in USO shows, aiding music programs in Mexico, and most notably its continued work with The MacDowell (artists' residency and workshop) in Peterborough, New Hampshire.

In 1931, the fraternity built and endowed a stone cottage at the MacDowell Colony for use by creative artists. Pi Sigma also built a practice studio at the National Music Camp in Interlochen, Michigan in 1934.

== Chapters ==
=== Collegiate chapters ===
In the following list of collegiate chapters, active chapters, and colonies are indicated in bold, and inactive chapters and institutions are in italics. The fraternity refers to its colonies as probationary chapters.

Chapter	Charter date and range	Institution	Location	Status	Ref.
Alpha	May 5, 1912	Northwestern University	Evanston, Illinois	Inactive	
Beta	July 17, 1917 – 1954	Chicago Musical College	Chicago, Illinois	Inactive	
Gamma	1919	American Conservatory of Music	Chicago, Illinois	Inactive	
Delta	1918	University of Cincinnati – College-Conservatory of Music	Cincinnati, Ohio	Inactive	
Epsilon	1920	The New Orleans Conservatory of Music and Dramatic Art (School absorbed by Loyola University New Orleans in 1932)	New Orleans, Louisiana	Inactive	
Zeta	1920	Cosmopolitan School of Music	Cincinnati, Ohio	Inactive	
Eta	1921	Stetson University	DeLand, Florida	Inactive	
Theta	1923	Rollins College	Winter Park, Florida	Inactive	
Iota	1923–c. 1932	Bush Conservatory of Music	Chicago, Illinois	Inactive	(Note: The Bush Conservatory closed in 1932.)
Kappa	1925	University of Kentucky	Lexington, Kentucky	Inactive	
Lamba	1925	University of Southern California	Los Angeles, California	Inactive	
Mu	1925	University of California, Los Angeles	Los Angeles, California	Inactive	
Nu	1926	Knox College	Galesburg, Illinois	Inactive	
Xi	1927	University of Wisconsin–Madison	Madison, Wisconsin	Inactive	
Omicron	1928	William Woods University	Fulton, Missouri	Inactive	
Pi	1929	University of Oregon	Eugene, Oregon	Inactive	
Rho	1929	MacPhail School of Music	Minneapolis, Minnesota	Inactive	(Note: In 1966, the MacPhail family gave the MacPhail College of Music to the University of Minnesota, which changed the name to the MacPhail Center for the Performing Arts.)
Sigma	1929–before 1962	University of Illinois	Champaign, Illinois	Inactive	
Tau	April 18, 1931	Central Methodist University	Fayette, Missouri	Inactive	
Upsilon	1931–before 1962	Butler University	Indianapolis, Indiana	Inactive	
**Phi**	1932	Capital University	Bexley, Ohio	Active	
Chi	1932–before 1962	Arkansas State University	Jonesboro, Arkansas	Inactive	
Psi	1932–before 1962	Carroll University	Waukesha, Wisconsin	Inactive	
Omega	1933–c. 1955	College of Music of Cincinnati	Cincinnati, Ohio	Inactive	(Note: The college merged with the Cincinnati Conservatory of Music in 1955, forming the Cincinnati College-Conservatory of Music, which is now part of the University of Cincinnati.)
Alpha Alpha	1939–before 1962	Louisiana State University	Baton Rouge, Louisiana	Inactive	
Alpha Beta	1939	Virginia Intermont College	Bristol, Virginia	Inactive	
Alpha Gamma	1947–1961	University of California, Santa Barbara	Santa Barbara, California	Inactive	
Alpha Delta	1948	Transylvania University	Lexington, Kentucky	Inactive	
Alpha Epsilon	1948	University of Houston	Houston, Texas	Inactive	
Alpha Zeta	1950	George Pepperdine College	Los Angeles County, California	Inactive	
Alpha Eta	1951–1960	Sacred Heart Dominican College	Houston, Texas	Inactive	
Alpha Theta	1953	University of Portland	Portland, Oregon	Inactive	
Alpha Iota	1954	Centenary University	Hackettstown, New Jersey	Inactive	
Alpha Kappa	1955	California State University, Long Beach	Long Beach, California	Inactive	(Note: Chapter formed at Long Beach State College, now California State University, Long Beach.)
Alpha Lambda	1955	San Francisco State University	San Francisco, California	Inactive	
Alpha Mu	1956	Stanford University	Stanford, California	Inactive	
Alpha Nu	1959	University of Louisiana at Monroe	Monroe, Louisiana	Inactive	(Note: Chapter formed at Northeast Louisiana State College, now the University of Louisiana at Monroe.)
Alpha Xi	1962	St. Mary's Dominican College	New Orleans, Louisiana	Inactive	(Note: The college closed in 1984.)
Alpha Omicron	1962	Louisiana Tech University	Ruston, Louisiana	Inactive	
Alpha Pi	1962	Hofstra University	Hempstead and Uniondale, New York	Inactive	
Alpha Rho	1962	Portland State University	Portland, Oregon	Inactive	
Alpha Sigma	1963	Whittier College	Whittier, California	Inactive	
Alpha Tau	1965	California State University, Fullerton	Fullerton, California	Inactive	
Alpha Upsilon	1967	Pacific Lutheran University	Parkland, Washington	Inactive	
Alpha Phi	1967	University of Puget Sound	Tacoma, Washington	Inactive	
Alpha Chi	May 19, 1968	Seattle University	Seattle, Washington	Inactive	
Alpha Psi		Ursuline College	Pepper Pike, Ohio	Inactive	
Beta Beta		George Mason University	Fairfax, Virginia	Inactive	
Beta Gamma		Augsburg University	Minneapolis, Minnesota	Inactive	
**University of Michigan**		University of Michigan	Ann Arbor, Michigan	Colony	(Note: The fraternity uses the term "probationary chapter" instead of colony.)

=== Alumni chapters ===
Following is an incomplete list of Pi Beta alumni chapters.

Chapter	Charter date and range	Location	Status	Ref.
**Pi Eta**		Madison, Wisconsin	Active	
**Pi Epsilon Alpha**		Virtual	Active	
**Pi Alpha Sigma**		Cleveland, Ohio	Active	
**Pi Alpha Mu**		Cincinnati, Ohio	Active	
**Pi Alpha Tau**		Houston, Texas	Active	

== See also ==
- Professional fraternities and sororities
