= Phi Gamma Nu =

American business fraternity

- ΦΓΝ
- Founded: February 17, 1924; 102 years ago Northwestern University Chicago campus
- Type: Professional
- Affiliation: PFA
- Former affiliation: PPA
- Status: Active
- Emphasis: Business
- Scope: National (United States)
- Colors: Cardinal and Gold
- Flower: Red Rose
- Jewel: Ruby
- Publication: The Magazine of Phi Gamma Nu
- Chapters: 24 active
- Headquarters: 11A Sheraton Drive; Ithaca, New York 14850; United States
- Website: www.phigammanu.com

Phi Gamma Nu (ΦΓΝ) is a co-ed business fraternity in the United States. It was founded as a sorority at Northwestern University in 1924.

== History ==
Phi Gamma Nu was founded on February 17, 1924 at the Chicago campus of Northwestern University. The founders were Sylvia Pekar Arnold, Elizabeth Conroy Fleming, Marge McInerney Hawes, Mary Chard Nalbach, Helen Vogel Purcell, and Celeste Weyl.

Phi Gamma Nu was established as a sorority for women pursuing studies in business. It went national in October 1927 with the addition of the Beta chapter at Boston University. Its national publication, The Magazine of Phi Gamma Nu, was first published in October 1930. It became a member of the Women's Professional Panhellenic Association on February 7, 1937.

The sorority spent the next fifty years operating in much the same way but the organization changed to a co-ed in 1974 due to the Title IX act. While Phi Gamma Nu began accepting male members in 1974, the National Chapter Congress changed the name of Phi Gamma Nu Sorority to Phi Gamma Nu Fraternity to comply with Title IX until 1981.

The fraternity was a charter member of the Professional Fraternity Association, created with the (Women's) Professional Panhellenic Association merged with the Professional Interfraternity Conference.

== Symbols ==
Phi Gamma Nu's colors are cardinal red and gold. Its flower is the red rose. Its jewel is the ruby. Its publication is The Magazine of Phi Gamma Nu.

== Chapters ==
Currently, Phi Gamma Nu has eighteen active collegiate chapters.

== Notable members ==
- Barbara K. Hackett (honorary) - United States District Judge

== See also ==
- Professional fraternities and sororities
