= List of Omicron Nu chapters =

Omicron Nu was an American honor society for home economics that was established at Michigan Agricultural College in 1912. In 1990, it merged with Kappa Omicron Phi to form Kappa Omicron Nu (ΚΟΝ). In the following list of its chapters, inactive chapters and institutions are in italics.

Chapter	Charter date and range	Institution	Location	Status	Ref.
Alpha	April 16, 1912 – 1990	Michigan State University	East Lansing, Michigan	Merged (ΚΟΝ)	
Beta	1913–1932	New York State College for Teachers	Albany, New York	Inactive	
Gamma	April 28, 1913 – 1990	Iowa State University	Ames, Iowa	Merged (ΚΟΝ)	
Delta	1913–1990	Purdue University	West Lafayette, Indiana	Merged (ΚΟΝ)	
Epsilon	1914–1990	University of Illinois Urbana-Champaign	Urbana, Illinois	Merged (ΚΟΝ)	
Zeta	1914–1990	University of Nebraska–Lincoln	Lincoln, Nebraska	Merged (ΚΟΝ)	
Eta	1915–1990	University of Wisconsin–Madison	Madison, Wisconsin	Merged (ΚΟΝ)	
Theta	1915–1990	Kansas State University	Manhattan, Kansas	Merged (ΚΟΝ)	
Iota	1915–1990	University of Kansas	Lawrence, Kansas	Merged (ΚΟΝ)	
Kappa	1919–1990	Washington State University	Pullman, Washington	Merged (ΚΟΝ)	
Lambda	1919–1990	Oregon State University	Corvallis, Oregon	Merged (ΚΟΝ)	
Mu	1919–1990	Cornell University	Ithaca, New York	Merged (ΚΟΝ)	
Nu	1921–1990	Colorado State University	Fort Collins, Colorado	Merged (ΚΟΝ)	
Xi	1920–1990	Oklahoma State University–Stillwater	Stillwater, Oklahoma	Merged (ΚΟΝ)	
Omicron	1922–1990	University of Washington	Seattle, Washington	Merged (ΚΟΝ)	
Pi	1922–1990	Florida State University	Tallahassee, Florida	Merged (ΚΟΝ)	
Rho	April 1923 – 1990	University of Minnesota	Saint Paul, Minnesota	Merged (ΚΟΝ)	
Sigma	1922–1990	Indiana University Bloomington	Bloomington, Indiana	Merged (ΚΟΝ)	
Tau	1924–1990	Pennsylvania State University	State College, Pennsylvania	Merged (ΚΟΝ)	
Upsilon	March 29, 1924 – 1990	University of Texas at Austin	Austin, Texas	Merged (ΚΟΝ)	
Phi	1925–1990	University of Vermont	Burlington, Vermont	Merged (ΚΟΝ)	
Chi	1925–1990	University of California, Los Angeles	Los Angeles, California	Merged (ΚΟΝ)	
Psi	1926–1990	University of Oklahoma	Norman, Oklahoma	Merged (ΚΟΝ)	
Omega	1928–1990	Ohio State University	Columbus, Ohio	Merged (ΚΟΝ)	
Alpha Alpha	1930–1990	University of Iowa	Iowa City, Iowa	Merged (ΚΟΝ)	
Alpha Beta	1931–1990	University of Maine	Orono, Maine	Merged (ΚΟΝ)	
Alpha Gamma	1931–1990	University of Montevallo	Montevallo, Alabama	Merged (ΚΟΝ)	
Alpha Delta	1933–1990	University of Utah	Salt Lake City, Utah	Merged (ΚΟΝ)	
Alpha Epsilon	1935–1990	University of Tennessee	Knoxville, Tennessee	Merged (ΚΟΝ)	
Alpha Zeta	1937–1990	University of Maryland	College Park, Maryland	Merged (ΚΟΝ)	
Alpha Eta	1938–1990	Drexel University	Philadelphia, Pennsylvania	Merged (ΚΟΝ)	
Alpha Theta	1939–1990	University of Cincinnati	Cincinnati, Ohio	Merged (ΚΟΝ)	
Alpha Iota	1941–1990	Syracuse University	Syracuse, New York	Merged (ΚΟΝ)	
Alpha Kappa	1942–1990	University of North Carolina at Greensboro	Greensboro, North Carolina	Merged (ΚΟΝ)	
Alpha Lambda	1944–1990	University of California, Davis	Davis, California	Merged (ΚΟΝ)	
Alpha Mu	1951–1990	University of Rhode Island	Kingston, Rhode Island	Merged (ΚΟΝ)	
Alpha Nu	1951–1990	Auburn University	Auburn, Alabama	Merged (ΚΟΝ)	
Alpha Xi	1952–1990	Carnegie Mellon University	Pittsburgh, Pennsylvania	Merged (ΚΟΝ)	
Alpha Omicron	1952–1990	West Virginia University	Morgantown, West Virginia	Merged (ΚΟΝ)	
Alpha Pi	1952–1990	University of Massachusetts Amherst	Amherst, Massachusetts	Merged (ΚΟΝ)	
Alpha Rho	1959–1990	Chapter-at-Large (Teachers College, Columbia University; Hunter College, and New York University)	New York City, New York	Merged (ΚΟΝ)	
Alpha Sigma	1961–1990	University of Arizona	Tucson, Arizona	Merged (ΚΟΝ)	
Alpha Tau	1961–1990	Brigham Young University	Provo, Utah	Merged (ΚΟΝ)	
Alpha Upsilon	1963–1990	University of Delaware	Newark, Delaware	Merged (ΚΟΝ)	
Alpha Phi	1963–1990	Howard University	Washington, D.C.	Merged (ΚΟΝ)	
Alpha Chi	1969–1990	Radford University	Radford, Virginia	Merged (ΚΟΝ)	
Alpha Psi	1969–1990	California State University, Long Beach	Long Beach, California	Merged (ΚΟΝ)	
Alpha Omega	1972–1990	University of Missouri	Columbia, Missouri	Merged (ΚΟΝ)	
Beta Alpha	1973–1990	Rutgers University–New Brunswick	New Brunswick, New Jersey	Merged (ΚΟΝ)	
Beta Beta	1976–1990	Louisiana Tech University	Ruston, Louisiana	Merged (ΚΟΝ)	
Beta Gamma	1976–1990	Northern Illinois University	DeKalb, Illinois	Merged (ΚΟΝ)	
Beta Delta	1977-19xx	Louisiana State University	Baton Rouge, Louisiana	Inactive	
Beta Epsilon	1979–1990	California State University, Northridge	Los Angeles, California	Merged (ΚΟΝ)	
Beta Zeta	1985–1990	Virginia Tech	Blacksburg, Virginia	Merged (ΚΟΝ)	
Beta Eta	1987–1990	University of Puerto Rico, Río Piedras Campus	San Juan, Puerto Rico	Merged (ΚΟΝ)	
Beta Theta	1989–1990	Montclair State University	Montclair, New Jersey	Merged (ΚΟΝ)	
