= List of Kappa Omicron Phi chapters =

Kappa Omicron Phi was an American home economics honor society that was established in 1922 at Northwest Missouri State University. In 1990, it merged with Omicron Nu to form Kappa Omicron Nu (ΚΟΝ).

In the following list of chapters, active chapters are indicated in bold and inactive chapters are in italics.

Chapter	Charter date and range	Institution	Location	Status	Ref.
Alpha	December 11, 1922 – 1990	Northwest Missouri State University	Maryville, Missouri	Merged **ΚΟΝ**	(Note: Became the Kappa Alpha chapter of Kappa Omicron Nu.)
Beta	1923–1990	University of Central Missouri	Warrensburg, Missouri	Merged **ΚΟΝ**	(Note: Became the Kappa Beta chapter of Kappa Omicron Nu.)
Gamma	1925–1933, 1951–1990	Fort Hays State University	Hays, Kansas	Merged **ΚΟΝ**	(Note: Became the Kappa Gamma chapter of Kappa Omicron Nu.)
Delta	1925–1990	Southeast Missouri State University	Cape Girardeau, Missouri	Merged **ΚΟΝ**	(Note: Became the Kappa Delta chapter of Kappa Omicron Nu.)
Epsilon	1926–1990	Marshall University	Huntington, West Virginia	Merged **ΚΟΝ**	(Note: Became the Kappa Epsilon chapter of Kappa Omicron Nu.)
Zeta	1927–1961	West Texas State University	Canyon, Texas	Inactive	
Eta	1927–1942	University of Arizona	Tucson, Arizona	Inactive	
Theta	1928–1990	University of California, Santa Barbara	Santa Barbara, California	Merged **ΚΟΝ**	(Note: Became the Kappa Theta chapter of Kappa Omicron Nu.)
Iota	1928–1990	Texas A&M University–Kingsville	Kingsville, Texas	Merged **ΚΟΝ**	(Note: Became the Kappa Iota chapter of Kappa Omicron Nu.)
Kappa	1928–1967	College of Emporia	Emporia, Kansas	Inactive	
Lambda	1928–1938	Oklahoma College for Women	Chickasha, Oklahoma	Inactive	
Mu	1929–1977	Southwestern College	Winfield, Kansas	Inactive	
Nu	1930–1945	Nebraska State Teachers College at Peru	Peru, Nebraska	Inactive	
Xi	1930–1931	Ohio Wesleyan University	Delaware, Ohio	Inactive	
Omicron	1934–1946	College of William and Mary	Williamsburg, Virginia	Inactive	
Pi	1936–1990	University of New Mexico	Albuquerque, New Mexico	Merged **ΚΟΝ**	(Note: Became the Kappa Pi chapter of Kappa Omicron Nu.)
Rho	1938–1949	Florida Southern College	Lakeland, Florida	Inactive	
Sigma	1939–1952	Louisiana Christian University	Pineville, Louisiana	Inactive	
Tau	1940–1990	Indiana State College	Indiana, Pennsylvania	Merged **ΚΟΝ**	(Note: Became the Kappa Tau chapter of Kappa Omicron Nu.)
Upsilon	1942–1979	Concord College	Athens, West Virginia	Inactive	
Phi	1943–1977	Our Lady of the Lake University	San Antonio, Texas	Inactive	
Chi	1944–1990	Immaculata University	East Whiteland Township, Pennsylvania	Merged **ΚΟΝ**	(Note: Became the Kappa Chi chapter of Kappa Omicron Nu.)
Psi	1945–1990	Missouri State University	Springfield, Missouri	Merged **ΚΟΝ**	(Note: Became the Kappa Psi chapter of Kappa Omicron Nu.)
Omega				Unassigned	
Alpha Alpha	1947–1947, 1975–1990	Marywood University	Scranton, Pennsylvania	Merged **ΚΟΝ**	(Note: Became the Kappa Alpha Alpha chapter of Kappa Omicron Nu.)
Alpha Beta	1948–1990	Mansfield University of Pennsylvania	Mansfield, Pennsylvania	Merged **ΚΟΝ**	(Note: Became the Kappa Alpha Beta chapter of Kappa Omicron Nu.)
Alpha Gamma	1948–1990	Seton Hill University	Greensburg, Pennsylvania	Merged **ΚΟΝ**	(Note: Became the Kappa Alpha Gamma chapter of Kappa Omicron Nu.)
Alpha Delta	1949–1962	Carthage College	Kenosha, Wisconsin	Inactive	
Alpha Epsilon	1949–1965	Mount Mary University	Milwaukee, Wisconsin	Inactive	
Alpha Zeta	1949–1976	Saint Mary-of-the-Woods College	Terre Haute, Indiana	Inactive	
Alpha Eta	1949–1968	Mercyhurst College	Erie, Pennsylvania	Inactive	
Alpha Theta	1950–1990	Eastern Illinois University	Charleston, Illinois	Merged **ΚΟΝ**	(Note: Became the Kappa Alpha Theta chapter of Kappa Omicron Nu.)
Alpha Iota	1951–1956	Regis College	Boston, Massachusetts	Inactive	
Alpha Kappa	1951–1985	Southern Illinois University Carbondale	Carbondale, Illinois	Inactive	
Alpha Lambda	1951–1990	University of Southern Mississippi	Hattiesburg, Mississippi	Merged **ΚΟΝ**	(Note: Became the Kappa Alpha Lambda chapter of Kappa Omicron Nu.)
Alpha Mu	1951–1990	Illinois State University	Normal, Illinois	Merged **ΚΟΝ**	(Note: Became the Kappa Alpha Mu chapter of Kappa Omicron Nu.)
Alpha Nu	1955–1990	Kent State University	Kent, Ohio	Merged **ΚΟΝ**	(Note: Became the Kappa Alpha Nu chapter of Kappa Omicron Nu.)
Alpha Xi	1955–1981	Pepperdine University	Malibu, California	Inactive	
Alpha Omicron	November 19, 1955 – 1990	University of Nebraska at Kearney	Kearney, Nebraska	Merged **ΚΟΝ**	(Note: Became the Kappa Alpha Omicron chapter of Kappa Omicron Nu.)
Alpha Pi	1956–1990	Middle Tennessee State University	Murfreesboro, Tennessee	Merged **ΚΟΝ**	(Note: Became the Kappa Alpha Pi chapter of Kappa Omicron Nu.)
Alpha Rho	1961–1964	Lindenwood University	St. Charles, Missouri	Inactive	
Alpha Sigma	1961–1990	Murray State University	Murray, Kentucky	Merged **ΚΟΝ**	(Note: Became the Kappa Alpha Sigma chapter of Kappa Omicron Nu.)
Alpha Tau	1961–1990	Bradley University	Peoria, Illinois	Merged **ΚΟΝ**	(Note: Became the Kappa Alpha Tau chapter of Kappa Omicron Nu.)
Alpha Upsilon	1962–1988	Longwood College	Farmville, Virginia	Inactive	
Alpha Phi	1962–1990	Sam Houston State University	Huntsville, Texas	Merged **ΚΟΝ**	(Note: Became the Kappa Alpha Phi chapter of Kappa Omicron Nu.)
Alpha Chi	1962–1968	Mary Washington College	Fredericksburg, Virginia	Inactive	
Alpha Psi	October 27, 1962 – c. 1989	University of Montana	Missoula, Montana	Inactive	(Note: Chapter closed when the university dissolved its Department of Home Economics.)
Alpha Omega				Unassigned	
Beta Alpha	1962–1990	Samford University	Homewood, Alabama	Merged **ΚΟΝ**	(Note: Became the Kappa Beta Alpha chapter of Kappa Omicron Nu.)
Beta Beta	1963–1990	University of North Alabama	Florence, Alabama	Merged **ΚΟΝ**	(Note: Became the Kappa Beta Alpha chapter of Kappa Omicron Nu.)
Beta Gamma	1963–1963	University of Puget Sound	Tacoma, Washington	Inactive	
Beta Delta	1963–1990	Shepherd University	Shepherdstown, West Virginia	Merged **ΚΟΝ**	(Note: Became the Kappa Beta Delta chapter of Kappa Omicron Nu.)
Beta Epsilon	1963–1990	Prairie View A&M University	Prairie View, Texas	Merged **ΚΟΝ**	(Note: Became the Kappa Beta Epsilon chapter of Kappa Omicron Nu.)
Beta Zeta	1964–1984	University of Detroit Mercy	Detroit, Michigan	Inactive	
Beta Eta	1964–1990	Virginia State University	Petersburg, Virginia	Merged **ΚΟΝ**	(Note: Became the Kappa Beta Eta chapter of Kappa Omicron Nu.)
Beta Theta	1965–1990	Lamar University	Beaumont, Texas	Merged **ΚΟΝ**	(Note: Became the Kappa Theta Alpha chapter of Kappa Omicron Nu.)
Beta Iota	1964–1972	St. Joseph's College	Emmitsburg, Maryland	Inactive	
Beta Kappa	1965–1990	Western Illinois University	Macomb, Illinois	Merged **ΚΟΝ**	(Note: Became the Kappa Beta Kappa chapter of Kappa Omicron Nu.)
Beta Lambda	1967–1990	Grambling State University	Grambling, Louisiana	Merged **ΚΟΝ**	(Note: Became the Kappa Lambda Alpha chapter of Kappa Omicron Nu.)
Beta Mu	1968–1990	Tennessee Tech	Cookeville, Tennessee	Merged **ΚΟΝ**	(Note: Became the Kappa Beta Mu chapter of Kappa Omicron Nu.)
Beta Nu	1968–1990	Northeast Missouri State University	Kirksville, Missouri	Merged **ΚΟΝ**	(Note: Became the Kappa Beta Nu chapter of Kappa Omicron Nu.)
Beta Xi	1968–1990	Carson–Newman University	Jefferson City, Tennessee	Merged **ΚΟΝ**	(Note: Became the Kappa Beta Xi chapter of Kappa Omicron Nu.)
Beta Omicron	1968–1990	Morehead State University	Morehead, Kentucky	Merged **ΚΟΝ**	(Note: Became the Kappa Beta Omicron chapter of Kappa Omicron Nu.)
Beta Pi	1968–1972	Austin Peay State University	Clarksville, Tennessee	Inactive	(Note: Became the Kappa Beta Pi chapter of Kappa Omicron Nu.)
Beta Rho	1969–1990	East Tennessee State University	Johnson City, Tennessee	Merged **ΚΟΝ**	(Note: Became the Kappa Beta Rho chapter of Kappa Omicron Nu.)
Beta Sigma	1970–1990	Tennessee State University	Nashville, Tennessee	Merged **ΚΟΝ**	(Note: Became the Kappa Beta Sigma chapter of Kappa Omicron Nu.)
Beta Tau	1971–1990	West Virginia Wesleyan College	Buckhannon, West Virginia	Merged **ΚΟΝ**	(Note: Became the Kappa Beta Tau chapter of Kappa Omicron Nu.)
Beta Upsilon	1971–1986	Georgetown College	Georgetown, Kentucky	Inactive	
Beta Phi	1972–1990	Mississippi State University	Starkville, Mississippi	Merged **ΚΟΝ**	(Note: Became the Kappa Beta Phi chapter of Kappa Omicron Nu.)
Beta Chi	1972–1990	McNeese State University	Lake Charles, Louisiana	Merged **ΚΟΝ**	(Note: Became the Kappa Beta Chi chapter of Kappa Omicron Nu.)
Beta Psi	1972–1984	Lincoln University	Jefferson City, Missouri	Inactive	
Beta Omega				Unassigned	
Gamma Alpha	1972–1990	Alcorn State University	Lorman, Mississippi	Merged **ΚΟΝ**	(Note: Became the Kappa Gamma Alpha chapter of Kappa Omicron Nu.)
Gamma Beta	1972–1977	Barry University	Miami Shores, Florida	Inactive	
Gamma Gamma	1973-1987	Whittier College	Whittier, California	Inactive	
Gamma Delta	1973–1990	Delta State University	Cleveland, Mississippi	Merged **ΚΟΝ**	(Note: Became the Kappa Gamma Delta chapter of Kappa Omicron Nu.)
Gamma Epsilon	1973–1990	North Carolina Central University	Durham, North Carolina	Merged **ΚΟΝ**	(Note: Became the Kappa Gamma Epsilon chapter of Kappa Omicron Nu.)
Gamma Zeta	1973–1990	Central Michigan University	Mount Pleasant, Michigan	Merged **ΚΟΝ**	(Note: Became the Kappa Gamma Zeta chapter of Kappa Omicron Nu.)
Gamma Eta	1973–1990	University of Mississippi	Oxford, Mississippi	Merged **ΚΟΝ**	(Note: Became the Kappa Gamma Eta chapter of Kappa Omicron Nu.)
Gamma Theta	1973–1990	Baylor University	Waco, Texas	Merged **ΚΟΝ**	(Note: Became the Kappa Gamma Theta chapter of Kappa Omicron Nu.)
Gamma Iota	1973–1990	Albright College	Reading, Pennsylvania	Merged **ΚΟΝ**	(Note: Became the Kappa Gamma Iota chapter of Kappa Omicron Nu.)
Gamma Kappa	1974–1990	University of Memphis	Memphis, Tennessee	Merged **ΚΟΝ**	(Note: Became the Kappa Gamma Kappa chapter of Kappa Omicron Nu.)
Gamma Lambda	1974–1990	Adrian College	Adrian, Michigan	Merged **ΚΟΝ**	(Note: Became the Kappa Gamma Lambda chapter of Kappa Omicron Nu.)
Gamma Mu	1974–1983	Brooklyn College	New York City, New York	Inactive	
Gamma Nu	1974–1990	University of Louisiana at Monroe	Monroe, Louisiana	Merged **ΚΟΝ**	(Note: Became the Kappa Gamma Nu chapter of Kappa Omicron Nu.)
Gamma Xi	1974–1990	University of Dayton	Dayton, Ohio	Merged **ΚΟΝ**	(Note: Became the Kappa Gamma Xi chapter of Kappa Omicron Nu.)
Gamma Omicron	1975–1980	Northern Michigan University	Marquette, Michigan	Inactive	
Gamma Pi	1975–1990	University of Louisiana at Lafayette	Lafayette, Louisiana	Merged **ΚΟΝ**	(Note: Became the Kappa Gamma Pi chapter of Kappa Omicron Nu.)
Gamma Rho	1975–1990	Alabama A&M University	Normal, Alabama	Merged **ΚΟΝ**	(Note: Became the Kappa Gamma Rho chapter of Kappa Omicron Nu.)
Gamma Sigma	1975–1990	South Carolina State University	Orangeburg, South Carolina	Merged **ΚΟΝ**	(Note: Became the Kappa Gamma Sigma chapter of Kappa Omicron Nu.)
Gamma Tau	1976–1990	Valparaiso University	Valparaiso, Indiana	Merged **ΚΟΝ**	(Note: Became the Kappa Gamma Tau chapter of Kappa Omicron Nu.)
Gamma Upsilon	1976–1990	Appalachian State University	Boone, North Carolina	Merged **ΚΟΝ**	(Note: Became the Kappa Gamma Upsilon chapter of Kappa Omicron Nu.)
Gamma Phi	1976–1990	Northwestern State University	Natchitoches, Louisiana	Merged **ΚΟΝ**	(Note: Became the Kappa Gamma Phi chapter of Kappa Omicron Nu.)
Gamma Chi	1976––1990	Bethel College, McPherson College, and Sterling College	North Newton, McPherson, and Sterling, Kansas	Merged **ΚΟΝ**	(Note: Became the Kappa Gamma Chi chapter of Kappa Omicron Nu.)
Gamma Psi	1976–1990	University of Tennessee at Chattanooga	Chattanooga, Tennessee	Merged **ΚΟΝ**	(Note: Became the Kappa Gamma Psi chapter of Kappa Omicron Nu.)
Gamma Omega				Unassigned	
Delta Alpha	1976–1990	University of Minnesota Duluth	Duluth, Minnesota	Merged **ΚΟΝ**	(Note: Became the Kappa Delta Alpha chapter of Kappa Omicron Nu.)
Delta Beta	1976–1990	Hood College	Frederick, Maryland	Merged **ΚΟΝ**	(Note: Became the Kappa Delta Beta chapter of Kappa Omicron Nu.)
Delta Gamma	1977–1990	University of Akron	Akron, Ohio	Merged **ΚΟΝ**	(Note: Became the Kappa Delta Gamma chapter of Kappa Omicron Nu.)
Delta Delta	1977–1990	Butler University	Indianapolis, Indiana	Merged **ΚΟΝ**	(Note: Became the Kappa Delta Delta chapter of Kappa Omicron Nu.)
Delta Epsilon	1977–1990	Tuskegee University	Tuskegee, Alabama	Merged **ΚΟΝ**	(Note: Became the Kappa Delta Epsilon chapter of Kappa Omicron Nu.)
Delta Zeta	1978–1990	St. Catherine University	Saint Paul, Minnesota	Merged **ΚΟΝ**	(Note: Became the Kappa Delta Zeta chapter of Kappa Omicron Nu.)
Delta Eta	1978–1990	Rosary College	River Forest, Illinois	Merged **ΚΟΝ**	(Note: Became the Kappa Delta Eta chapter of Kappa Omicron Nu.)
Delta Theta	1978–1984	Mount St. Mary's College	Los Angeles, California	Inactive	
Delta Iota	1978–1990	Emporia State University	Emporia, Kansas	Merged **ΚΟΝ**	(Note: Became the Kappa Iota Alpha chapter of Kappa Omicron Nu.)
Delta Kappa	1978–1990	Glassboro State College	Glassboro, New Jersey	Merged **ΚΟΝ**	(Note: Became the Kappa Delta Kappa chapter of Kappa Omicron Nu.)
Delta Lambda	1979–1990	Cheyney State College	Cheyney, Pennsylvania	Merged **ΚΟΝ**	(Note: Became the Kappa Delta Lambda chapter of Kappa Omicron Nu.)
Delta Mu	1978–1990	North Carolina A&T University	Greensboro, North Carolina	Merged **ΚΟΝ**	(Note: Became the Kappa Delta Mu chapter of Kappa Omicron Nu.)
Delta Nu	1980–1990	Hampton University	Hampton, Virginia	Merged **ΚΟΝ**	(Note: Became the Kappa Delta Nu chapter of Kappa Omicron Nu.)
Delta Xi	1980–1990	Morgan State University	Baltimore, Maryland	Merged **ΚΟΝ**	(Note: Became the Kappa Delta Xi chapter of Kappa Omicron Nu.)
Delta Omicron	1981–1990	Meredith College	Raleigh, North Carolina	Merged **ΚΟΝ**	(Note: Became the Kappa Delta Omicron chapter of Kappa Omicron Nu.)
Delta Pi	1982–1990	Nicholls State University	Thibodaux, Louisiana	Merged **ΚΟΝ**	(Note: Became the Kappa Delta Pi chapter of Kappa Omicron Nu.)
Delta Rho	1982–1990	Olivet Nazarene University	Bourbonnais, Illinois	Merged **ΚΟΝ**	(Note: Became the Kappa Delta Rho chapter of Kappa Omicron Nu.)
Delta Sigma	1984–1990	Ashland University	Ashland, Ohio	Merged **ΚΟΝ**	(Note: Became the Kappa Delta Sigma chapter of Kappa Omicron Nu.)
Delta Tau	1985–1990	Heritage Christian University	Florence, Alabama	Merged **ΚΟΝ**	(Note: Became the Kappa Delta Tau chapter of Kappa Omicron Nu.)
Delta Upsilon	1985–1990	University of Maryland Eastern Shore	Princess Anne, Maryland	Merged **ΚΟΝ**	(Note: Became the Kappa Delta Upsilon chapter of Kappa Omicron Nu.)
Delta Phi	1987–1990	University of Nevada, Reno	Reno, Nevada	Merged **ΚΟΝ**	(Note: Became the Kappa Delta Phi chapter of Kappa Omicron Nu.)
Delta Chi	1990–1990	Andrews University	Berrien Springs, Michigan	Merged **ΚΟΝ**	(Note: Became the Kappa Delta Chi chapter of Kappa Omicron Nu.)
Delta Psi	1990–1990	University of Arkansas at Pine Bluff	Pine Bluff, Arkansas	Merged **ΚΟΝ**	(Note: Became the Kappa Delta Psi chapter of Kappa Omicron Nu.)
Delta Omega				Unassigned	
Epsilon Alpha	1990–1990	Abilene Christian University	Abilene, Texas	Merged **ΚΟΝ**	(Note: Became the Kappa Epsilon Alpha chapter of Kappa Omicron Nu.)
