= List of Kappa Omicron Nu chapters =

Kappa Omicron Nu is an American college honor society for students in human sciences. It was established by the 1990 merger of Omicron Nu and Kappa Omicron Phi.

Chapters that were part of the predecessor society Kappa Omicron Phi have the prefix "Kappa" before their Greek letter chapter name. Chapters that were part of the predecessor society Omicron Nu have the prefix "Omicron" before their Greek letter name. The first chapter chartered by Kappa Omicron Nu was named Nu Alpha, with the following chapters being named according to the Greek alphabet.

In the following list of chapters, active chapters are indicated in bold and inactive chapters are in italics.

Chapter	Charter date and range	Institution	Location	Status	Ref.
**Kappa Alpha**	December 11, 1922	Northwest Missouri State University	Maryville, Missouri	Active	
Kappa Beta	1923–xxxx ?	University of Central Missouri	Warrensburg, Missouri	Inactive	
Kappa Gamma	1925–1933, 1951–xxxx?	Fort Hays State University	Hays, Kansas	Inactive	
Kappa Delta	1925–xxxx ?	Southeast Missouri State University	Cape Girardeau, Missouri	Inactive	
Kappa Epsilon	1926–xxxx ?	Marshall University	Huntington, West Virginia	Inactive	
Kappa Zeta	1927–1961	West Texas State University	Canyon, Texas	Inactive	
Kappa Eta	1927–1942	University of Arizona	Tucson, Arizona	Inactive	
Kappa Theta	1928–19xx ?	University of California, Santa Barbara	Santa Barbara, California	Inactive	
**Kappa Iota**	1928	Texas A&M University–Kingsville	Kingsville, Texas	Active	
Kappa Kappa	1928–1967	College of Emporia	Emporia, Kansas	Inactive	
Kappa Lambda	1928–1938	Oklahoma College for Women	Chickasha, Oklahoma	Inactive	
Kappa Mu	1929–1977	Southwestern College	Winfield, Kansas	Inactive	
Kappa Nu	1930–1945	Nebraska State Teachers College at Peru	Peru, Nebraska	Inactive	
Kappa Xi	1930–1931	Ohio Wesleyan University	Delaware, Ohio	Inactive	
Kappa Omicron	1934–1946	College of William and Mary	Williamsburg, Virginia	Inactive	
**Kappa Pi**	1936	University of New Mexico	Albuquerque, New Mexico	Active	
Kappa Rho	1938–1949	Florida Southern College	Lakeland, Florida	Inactive	
Kappa Sigma	1939–1952	Louisiana Christian University	Pineville, Louisiana	Inactive	
Kappa Tau	1940–xxxx ?	Indiana State College	Indiana, Pennsylvania	Inactive	
Kappa Upsilon	1942–1979	Concord College	Athens, West Virginia	Inactive	
Kappa Phi	1943–1976	Our Lady of the Lake University	San Antonio, Texas	Inactive	
**Kappa Chi**	1944	Immaculata University	East Whiteland Township, Pennsylvania	Active	
Kappa Psi	1945–xxxx ?	Missouri State University	Springfield, Missouri	Inactive	
Kappa Omega				Unassigned	
Kappa Alpha Alpha	1947–1947, 1975–xxxx ?	Marywood University	Scranton, Pennsylvania	Inactive	
Kappa Alpha Beta	1948–xxxx ?	Mansfield University of Pennsylvania	Mansfield, Pennsylvania	Inactive	
**Kappa Alpha Gamma**	1948	Seton Hill University	Greensburg, Pennsylvania	Active	
Kappa Alpha Delta	1949–1962	Carthage College	Kenosha, Wisconsin	Inactive	
Kappa Alpha Epsilon	1949–1965	Mount Mary University	Milwaukee, Wisconsin	Inactive	
Kappa Alpha Zeta	1949–1976	Saint Mary-of-the-Woods College	Terre Haute, Indiana	Inactive	
Kappa Alpha Eta	1949–1968	Mercyhurst College	Erie, Pennsylvania	Inactive	
Kappa Alpha Theta	1950–xxxx ?	Eastern Illinois University	Charleston, Illinois	Inactive	
Kappa Alpha Iota	1951–1956	Regis College	Boston, Massachusetts	Inactive	
Kappa Alpha Kappa	1951–1985	Southern Illinois University Carbondale	Carbondale, Illinois	Inactive	
Kappa Alpha Lambda	1951–xxxx ?	University of Southern Mississippi	Hattiesburg, Mississippi	Inactive	
Kappa Alpha Mu	1951–xxxx ?	Illinois State University	Normal, Illinois	Inactive	
Kappa Alpha Nu	1955–xxxx ?	Kent State University	Kent, Ohio	Inactive	
Kappa Alpha Xi	1955–1981	Pepperdine University	Malibu, California	Inactive	
Kappa Alpha Omicron	November 19, 1955 – xxxx ?	University of Nebraska at Kearney	Kearney, Nebraska	Inactive	
Kappa Alpha Pi	1956–xxxx ?	Middle Tennessee State University	Murfreesboro, Tennessee	Inactive	
Kappa Alpha Rho	1961–1964	Lindenwood University	St. Charles, Missouri	Inactive	
Kappa Alpha Sigma	1961–xxxx ?	Murray State University	Murray, Kentucky	Inactive	
**Kappa Alpha Tau**	1961	Bradley University	Peoria, Illinois	Active	
Kappa Alpha Upsilon	1962–1988	Longwood College	Farmville, Virginia	Inactive	
**Kappa Alpha Phi**	1962	Sam Houston State University	Huntsville, Texas	Active	
Kappa Alpha Chi	1962–1968	Mary Washington College	Fredericksburg, Virginia	Inactive	
Kappa Alpha Psi	October 27, 1962 – c. 1989	University of Montana	Missoula, Montana	Inactive	(Note: Chapter closed when the university dissolved its Department of Home Economics.)
Kappa Alpha Omega				Unassigned	
**Kappa Beta Alpha**	1962	Samford University	Homewood, Alabama	Active	
**Kappa Beta Beta**	1963	University of North Alabama	Florence, Alabama	Active	
Kappa Beta Gamma	1963–1963	University of Puget Sound	Tacoma, Washington	Inactive	
Kappa Beta Delta	1963–xxxx ?	Shepherd University	Shepherdstown, West Virginia	Inactive	
**Kappa Beta Epsilon**	1963	Prairie View A&M University	Prairie View, Texas	Active	
Kappa Beta Zeta	1964–1984	University of Detroit Mercy	Detroit, Michigan	Inactive	
**Kappa Beta Eta**	1964	Virginia State University	Petersburg, Virginia	Active	
**Kappa Beta Theta**	1965	Lamar University	Beaumont, Texas	Active	
Kappa Beta Iota	1964–1972	St. Joseph's College	Emmitsburg, Maryland	Inactive	
**Kappa Beta Kappa**	1965	Western Illinois University	Macomb, Illinois	Active	
Kappa Beta Lambda	1967–xxxx ?	Grambling State University	Grambling, Louisiana	Inactive	
**Kappa Beta Mu**	1968	Tennessee Tech	Cookeville, Tennessee	Active	
Kappa Beta Nu	1968–xxxx ?	Northeast Missouri State University	Kirksville, Missouri	Inactive	
**Kappa Beta Xi**	1968	Carson–Newman University	Jefferson City, Tennessee	Active	
Kappa Beta Omicron	1968–xxxx ?	Morehead State University	Morehead, Kentucky	Inactive	
Kappa Beta Pi	1968–1972	Austin Peay State University	Clarksville, Tennessee	Inactive	
Kappa Beta Rho	1969–xxxx ?	East Tennessee State University	Johnson City, Tennessee	Inactive	
**Kappa Beta Sigma**	1970	Tennessee State University	Nashville, Tennessee	Active	
Kappa Beta Tau	1971–xxxx ?	West Virginia Wesleyan College	Buckhannon, West Virginia	Inactive	
Kappa Beta Upsilon	1971–1986	Georgetown College	Georgetown, Kentucky	Inactive	
**Kappa Beta Phi**	1972	Mississippi State University	Starkville, Mississippi	Active	
Kappa Beta Chi	1972–xxxx ?	McNeese State University	Lake Charles, Louisiana	Inactive	
Kappa Beta Psi	1972–1984	Lincoln University	Jefferson City, Missouri	Inactive	
Kappa Beta Omega				Unassigned	
**Kappa Gamma Alpha**	1972	Alcorn State University	Lorman, Mississippi	Active	
Kappa Gamma Beta	1972–1977	Barry University	Miami Shores, Florida	Inactive	
Kappa Gamma Gamma	1973-1987	Whittier College	Whittier, California	Inactive	
**Kappa Gamma Delta**	1973	Delta State University	Cleveland, Mississippi	Active	
**Kappa Gamma Epsilon**	1973	North Carolina Central University	Durham, North Carolina	Active	
Kappa Gamma Zeta	1973–xxxx ?	Central Michigan University	Mount Pleasant, Michigan	Inactive	
**Kappa Gamma Eta**	1973	University of Mississippi	Oxford, Mississippi	Active	
**Kappa Gamma Theta**	1973	Baylor University	Waco, Texas	Active	
Kappa Gamma Iota	1973–xxxx ?	Albright College	Reading, Pennsylvania	Inactive	
Kappa Gamma Kappa	1974–xxxx ?	University of Memphis	Memphis, Tennessee	Inactive	
Kappa Gamma Lambda	1974–xxxx ?	Adrian College	Adrian, Michigan	Inactive	
Kappa Gamma Mu	1974–1983	Brooklyn College	New York City, New York	Inactive	
Kappa Gamma Nu	1974–xxxx ?	University of Louisiana at Monroe	Monroe, Louisiana	Inactive	
Kappa Gamma Xi	1974–xxxx ?	University of Dayton	Dayton, Ohio	Inactive	
Kappa Gamma Omicron	1975–1980	Northern Michigan University	Marquette, Michigan	Inactive	
Kappa Gamma Pi	1975–xxxx ?	University of Louisiana at Lafayette	Lafayette, Louisiana	Inactive	
**Kappa Gamma Rho**	1975	Alabama A&M University	Normal, Alabama	Active	
**Kappa Gamma Sigma**	1975	South Carolina State University	Orangeburg, South Carolina	Active	
Kappa Gamma Tau	1976–xxxx ?	Valparaiso University	Valparaiso, Indiana	Inactive	
**Kappa Gamma Upsilon**	1976	Appalachian State University	Boone, North Carolina	Active	
**Kappa Gamma Phi**	1976	Northwestern State University	Natchitoches, Louisiana	Active	
Kappa Gamma Chi	1976–xxxx ?	Bethel College, McPherson College, and Sterling College	North Newton, McPherson, and Sterling, Kansas	Inactive	
Kappa Gamma Psi	1976–xxxx ?	University of Tennessee at Chattanooga	Chattanooga, Tennessee	Inactive	
Kappa Gamma Omega				Unassigned	
Kappa Delta Alpha	1976–xxxx ?	University of Minnesota Duluth	Duluth, Minnesota	Inactive	
Kappa Delta Beta	1976–xxxx ?	Hood College	Frederick, Maryland	Inactive	
**Kappa Delta Gamma**	1977	University of Akron	Akron, Ohio	Active	
Kappa Delta Delta	1977–xxxx ?	Butler University	Indianapolis, Indiana	Inactive	
Kappa Delta Epsilon	1977–xxxx ?	Tuskegee University	Tuskegee, Alabama	Inactive	
**Kappa Delta Zeta**	1978	St. Catherine University	Saint Paul, Minnesota	Active	
Kappa Delta Eta	1978–xxxx ?	Rosary College	River Forest, Illinois	Inactive	
Kappa Delta Theta	1978–1984	Mount St. Mary's College	Los Angeles, California	Inactive	
Kappa Delta Iota	1978–xxxx ?	Emporia State University	Emporia, Kansas	Inactive	
Kappa Delta Kappa	1978–xxxx ?	Glassboro State College	Glassboro, New Jersey	Inactive	
Kappa Delta Lambda	1979–xxxx ?	Cheyney State College	Cheyney, Pennsylvania	Inactive	
**Kappa Delta Mu**	1978	North Carolina A&T University	Greensboro, North Carolina	Active	
Kappa Delta Nu	1980–xxxx ?	Hampton University	Hampton, Virginia	Inactive	
**Kappa Delta Xi**	1980	Morgan State University	Baltimore, Maryland	Active	
**Kappa Delta Omicron**	1981	Meredith College	Raleigh, North Carolina	Active	
**Kappa Delta Pi**	1982	Nicholls State University	Thibodaux, Louisiana	Active	
**Kappa Delta Rho**	1982	Olivet Nazarene University	Bourbonnais, Illinois	Active	
Kappa Delta Sigma	1984–xxxx ?	Ashland University	Ashland, Ohio	Inactive	
Kappa Delta Tau	1985–xxxx ?	Heritage Christian University	Florence, Alabama	Inactive	
**Kappa Delta Upsilon**	1985	University of Maryland Eastern Shore	Princess Anne, Maryland	Active	
Kappa Delta Phi	1987–xxxx ?	University of Nevada, Reno	Reno, Nevada	Inactive	
Kappa Delta Chi	1990–xxxx ?	Andrews University	Berrien Springs, Michigan	Inactive	
**Kappa Delta Psi**	1990	University of Arkansas at Pine Bluff	Pine Bluff, Arkansas	Active	
Kappa Delta Omega				Unassigned	
Kappa Epsilon Alpha	1990–xxxx ?	Abilene Christian University	Abilene, Texas	Inactive	
Omicron Alpha	April 23, 1912–xxxx ?	Michigan State University	East Lansing, Michigan	Inactive	
Omicron Beta	1913–1932	New York State College for Teachers	Albany, New York	Inactive	
**Omicron Gamma**	1913	Iowa State University	Ames, Iowa	Active	
Omicron Delta	1913–xxxx ?	Purdue University	West Lafayette, Indiana	Inactive	
Omicron Epsilon	1914–xxxx ?	University of Illinois Urbana-Champaign	Urbana, Illinois	Inactive	
Omicron Zeta	1914–xxxx ?	University of Nebraska–Lincoln	Lincoln, Nebraska	Inactive	
Omicron Eta	1915–xxxx ?	University of Wisconsin–Madison	Madison, Wisconsin	Inactive	
**Omicron Theta**	1915	Kansas State University	Manhattan, Kansas	Active	
Omicron Iota	1915–xxxx ?	University of Kansas	Lawrence, Kansas	Inactive	
**Omicron Kappa**	1919	Washington State University	Pullman, Washington	Active	
Omicron Lambda	1919–xxxx ?	Oregon State University	Corvallis, Oregon	Inactive	
**Omicron Mu**	1919	Cornell University	Ithaca, New York	Active	
Omicron Nu	1921–xxxx ?	Colorado State University	Fort Collins, Colorado	Inactive	
Omicron Xi	1920–xxxx ?	Oklahoma State University–Stillwater	Stillwater, Oklahoma	Inactive	
Omicron Omicron	1922–xxxx ?	University of Washington	Seattle, Washington	Inactive	
**Omicron Pi**	1922	Florida State University	Tallahassee, Florida	Active	
Omicron Rho	April 1923–c. 1995	University of Minnesota	Saint Paul, Minnesota	Inactive	
Omicron Sigma	1922–xxxx ?	Indiana University Bloomington	Bloomington, Indiana	Inactive	
**Omicron Tau**	1924	Pennsylvania State University	State College, Pennsylvania	Active	
Omicron Upsilon	March 29, 1924 – xxxx ?	University of Texas at Austin	Austin, Texas	Inactive	
Omicron Phi	1925–xxxx ?	University of Vermont	Burlington, Vermont	Inactive	
Omicron Chi	1925–xxxx ?	University of California, Los Angeles	Los Angeles, California	Inactive	
Omicron Psi	1926–xxxx ?	University of Oklahoma	Norman, Oklahoma	Inactive	
Omicron Omega	1928–xxxx ?	Ohio State University	Columbus, Ohio	Inactive	
Omicron Alpha Alpha	1930–xxxx ?	University of Iowa	Iowa City, Iowa	Inactive	
**Omicron Alpha Beta**	1931	University of Maine	Orono, Maine	Active	
**Omicron Alpha Gamma**	1931	University of Montevallo	Montevallo, Alabama	Active	
**Omicron Alpha Delta**	1933	University of Utah	Salt Lake City, Utah	Active	
Omicron Alpha Epsilon	1935–xxxx ?	University of Tennessee	Knoxville, Tennessee	Inactive	
Omicron Alpha Zeta	1937–xxxx ?	University of Maryland, College Park	College Park, Maryland	Inactive	
Omicron Alpha Eta	1938–xxxx ?	Drexel University	Philadelphia, Pennsylvania	Inactive	
Omicron Alpha Theta	1939–xxxx ?	University of Cincinnati	Cincinnati, Ohio	Inactive	
**Omicron Alpha Iota**	1941	Syracuse University	Syracuse, New York	Active	
**Omicron Alpha Kappa**	1942	University of North Carolina at Greensboro	Greensboro, North Carolina	Active	
Omicron Alpha Lambda	1944–xxxx ?	University of California, Davis	Davis, California	Inactive	
Omicron Alpha Mu	1951–xxxx ?	University of Rhode Island	Kingston, Rhode Island	Inactive	
**Omicron Alpha Nu**	1951	Auburn University	Auburn, Alabama	Active	
Omicron Alpha Xi	1952–xxxx ?	Carnegie Mellon University	Pittsburgh, Pennsylvania	Inactive	
Omicron Alpha Omicron	1952–xxxx ?	West Virginia University	Morgantown, West Virginia	Inactive	
Omicron Alpha Pi	1952–xxxx ?	University of Massachusetts Amherst	Amherst, Massachusetts	Inactive	
Omicron Alpha Rho	1959–xxxx ?	New York University	New York City, New York	Inactive	(Note: Alpha Rho originally operated as a Chapter-at-Large that included Teachers College (Columbia), N.Y.U., and Hunter College. It was later split into two chapters.)
**Omicron Alpha Rho-Hunter**	1959	Hunter College	New York City, New York	Active	
Omicron Alpha Sigma	1961–xxxx ?	University of Arizona	Tucson, Arizona	Inactive	
Omicron Alpha Tau	1961–xxxx ?	Brigham Young University	Provo, Utah	Inactive	
**Omicron Alpha Upsilon**	1963	University of Delaware	Newark, Delaware	Active	
Omicron Alpha Phi	1963–xxxx ?	Howard University	Washington, D.C.	Inactive	
Omicron Alpha Chi	1969–xxxx ?	Radford University	Radford, Virginia	Inactive	
**Omicron Alpha Psi**	1969	California State University, Long Beach	Long Beach, California	Active	
Omicron Alpha Omega	1972–xxxx ?	University of Missouri	Columbia, Missouri	Inactive	
**Omicron Beta Alpha**	1973	Rutgers University–New Brunswick	New Brunswick, New Jersey	Active	
**Omicron Beta Beta**	1976	Louisiana Tech University	Ruston, Louisiana	Active	
**Omicron Beta Gamma**	1976	Northern Illinois University	DeKalb, Illinois	Active	
Omicron Beta Delta	1977-19xx	Louisiana State University	Baton Rouge, Louisiana	Inactive	
**Omicron Beta Epsilon**	1979	California State University, Northridge	Los Angeles, California	Active	
Omicron Beta Zeta	1985–xxxx ?	Virginia Tech	Blacksburg, Virginia	Inactive	
Omicron Beta Eta	1987–xxxx ?	University of Puerto Rico, Río Piedras Campus	San Juan, Puerto Rico	Inactive	
**Omicron Beta Theta**	1989	Montclair State University	Montclair, New Jersey	Active	
**Nu Alpha**		Berea College	Berea, Kentucky	Active	
Nu Beta				Inactive	
Nu Gamma	199x ?–xxxx ?	Norfolk State University	Norfolk, Virginia	Inactive	
**Nu Delta**		Harding University	Searcy, Arkansas	Active	
Nu Epsilon		Madonna University	Livonia, Michigan	Inactive	
**Nu Zeta**		Seattle Pacific University	Seattle, Washington	Active	
Nu Eta		Tarleton State University	Stephenville, Texas	Inactive	
Nu Theta		Western Michigan University	Kalamazoo, Michigan	Inactive	
Nu Iota		East Carolina University	Greenville, North Carolina	Inactive	
**Nu Kappa**		Penn State Altoona	Logan Township, Pennsylvania	Active	
Nu Lambda		Purdue University Calumet	Hammond, Indiana	Inactive	
**Nu Mu**		Washington State University Vancouver	Vancouver, Washington	Active	
**Nu Nu**		Southern Utah University	Cedar City, Utah	Active	
Nu Xi		Youngstown State University	Youngstown, Ohio	Inactive	
Nu Omicron		Pennsylvania Western University, California	California, Pennsylvania	Inactive	
**Nu Pi**		California State University, Fullerton	Fullerton, California	Active	
Nu Rho		Illinois Institute of Art – Chicago	Chicago, Illinois	Inactive	
Nu Sigma		DePauw University	Greencastle, Indiana	Inactive	
Nu Tau		Arizona State University	Tempe, Arizona	Inactive	
**Nu Upsilon**		California State University, San Marcos	San Marcos, California	Active	
**Nu Phi**		University of New Haven	West Haven, Connecticut	Active	
**Nu Chi**		University of the Incarnate Word	San Antonio, Texas	Active	
**Nu Psi**		Liberty University	Lynchburg, Virginia	Active	
**Nu Omega**		Life University	Marietta, Georgia	Active	
Nu Alpha Alpha		University of Texas at Tyler	Tyler, Texas	Inactive	
Nu Alpha Beta		Delaware State University	Dover, Delaware	Inactive	
**Nu Alpha Gamma**		Georgia Gwinnett College	Lawrenceville, Georgia	Active	
Nu Alpha Delta		California State University, Sacramento	Sacramento, California	Inactive	
**Nu Alpha Epsilon**		Georgian Court University	Lakewood Township, New Jersey	Active	
**Nu Alpha Zeta**		Elon University	Elon, North Carolina	Active	
**Nu Alpha Eta**		Stevenson University	Baltimore County, Maryland	Active	
Nu Alpha Theta		New Mexico State University	Las Cruces, New Mexico	Inactive	
**Nu Alpha Iota**		Missouri Baptist University	St. Louis, Missouri	Active	
**Nu Alpha Kappa**		Molloy University	Rockville Centre, New York	Active	
**Nu Alpha Lambda**		Blue Mountain Christian University	Blue Mountain, Mississippi	Active	
Nu Alpha Mu				Inactive	
**Nu Alpha Nu**		State University of New York at Oswego	Oswego, New York	Active	
**Nu Alpha Xi**		University of Alabama in Huntsville	Huntsville, Alabama	Active	
**Nu Alpha Omicron**		University of Florida	Gainesville, Florida	Active	
**Nu Alpha Pi**		Logan University	Chesterfield, Missouri	Active	
**Nu Alpha Rho**		Virtual Chapter	Michigan	Active	
**Nu Alpha Sigma**		Penn State Scranton	Dunmore, Pennsylvania	Active	
**Nu Alpha Tau**		Holy Family University	Philadelphia, Pennsylvania	Active	
**Nu Alpha Upsilon**		Marist College	Poughkeepsie, New York	Active	
**Nu Alpha Phi**		University of New England	Portland and Biddeford, Maine	Active	
**National Chapter**				Active	
**National Alumni Chapter**				Active	
		Berry College	Mount Berry, Georgia	Inactive	
		University of California, Berkeley	Berkeley, California	Inactive	
