= Rajammal P. Devadas =

Indian nutritionist and college chancellor

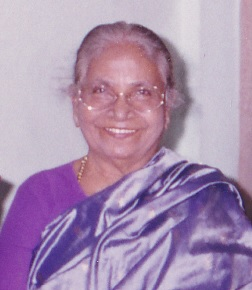
- Born: Rajammal Packiyanathan Devadas; 7 April 1919; Chengam, North Arcot, Tamil Nadu, India
- Died: 17 March 2002 (aged 82)
- Occupations: Nutritionist; Educationist
- Known for: Avinashilingam Institute for Home Science and Higher Education for Women
- Parent(s): Packiyanathan; Sornammal
- Awards: Padma Shri; Jamnalal Bajaj Award

Rajammal Packiyanathan Devadas (7 April 1919 – 17 March 2002) was an Indian nutritionist, educationist and a former chancellor of Avinashilingam Institute for Home Science and Higher Education for Women, popularly known as Avinashilingam Deemed University. She was a member of the State Planning Commission of Tamil Nadu, Tamil Nadu Commission for Women and the elected vice president of the World Food Conference. The Government of India awarded her the fourth highest civilian honour of the Padma Shri in 1992.

== Biography ==
Rajammal Packiyanathan, born on 7 April 1919 to Muthiah Packiyanathan and Sornammal, in Chengam, North Arcot District (present Tiruvannamalai district) in the south Indian state of Tamil Nadu, graduated in science from Queen Mary's College, Chennai in 1944 after which secured a master's degree in science (1948), a master's degree in arts (1949) and a doctoral degree in philosophy (1950) from Ohio State University.

Rajammal published several books and articles on the topics of nutrition and education and was the author of a book on T. S. Avinashilingam Chettiar. She was an honorary Colonel of the Tamil Nadu and Pondicherry chapters of the National Cadet Corps and a member of the Gandhigram Institute Rural Health and Family Planning, National Literacy Mission, Sigma Xi, Sigma Delta Epsilon, Omicron Nu, and Phi Upsilon Omicron. She served as the president of the Nutrition Society of India from 1987 to 1991.

== Awards and honours ==
- Recipient of doctoral degree (honoris Causea) from University of Madras, Oregon State University, Chandra Shekhar Azad University of Agriculture and Technology, Ohio State University and University of Ulster.
- The Government of India awarded her the civilian honour of the Padma Shri in 1992
- Seceived the Jamnalal Bajaj Award in 1998.
- She was awarded a lifetime achievement award by the International Union of Nutritional Science (IUNS) at the 17th Congress in Vienna Austria 2001.
- She was awarded the 4th Mahaveer Award for excellence in Education by Bhagwan Mahaveer Foundation in 1998

== See also ==
- Avinashilingam Institute for Home Science and Higher Education for Women
