= Helen W. Atwater =

American home economist and editor (1876–1947)

Helen Woodard Atwater
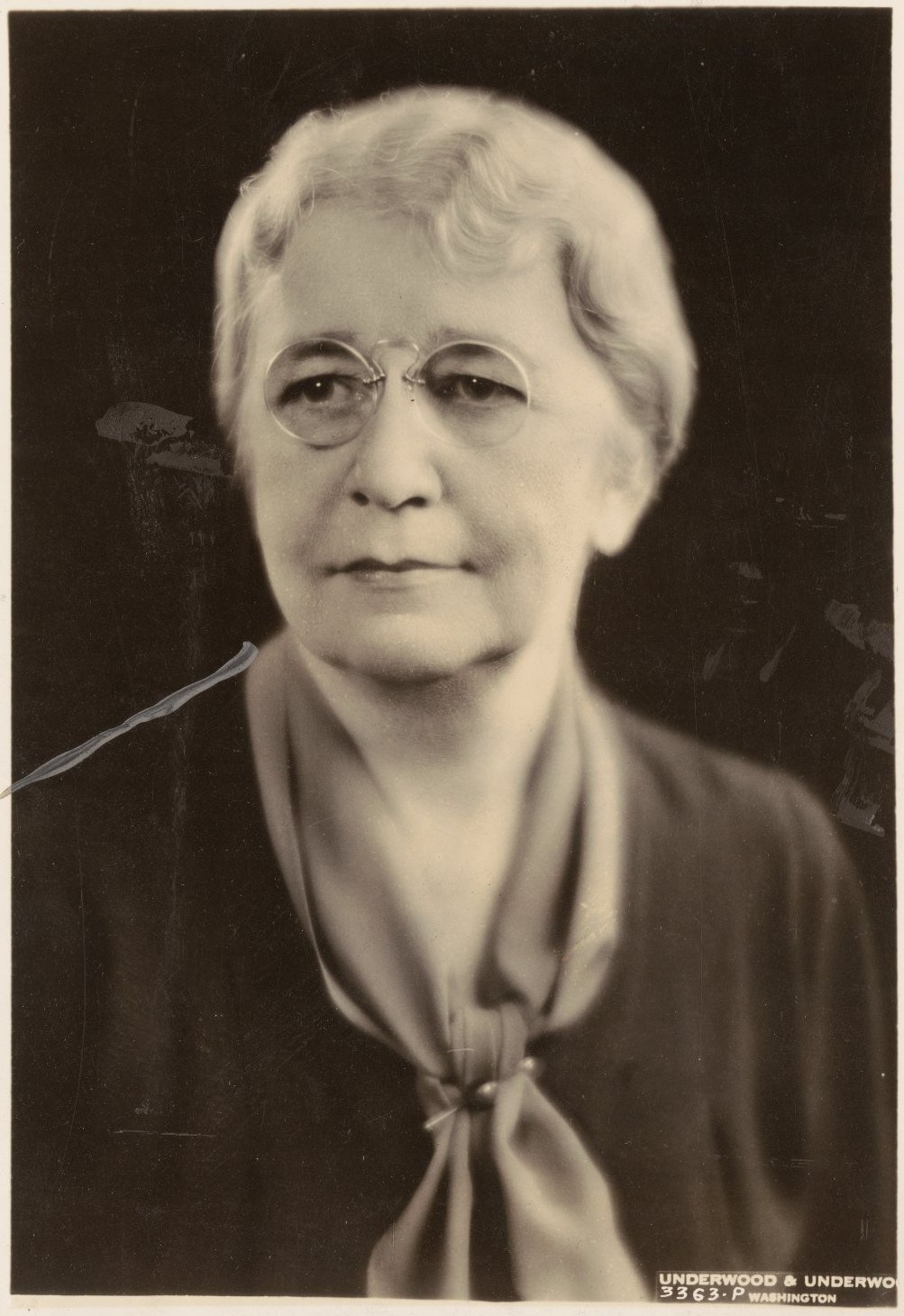
- Born: May 29, 1876; Somerville, Massachusetts
- Died: June 26, 1947 (aged 71)
- Education: Smith College
- Occupations: writer, home economics specialist and editor
- Employers: U.S. Department of Agriculture; American Home Economics Association
- Organization: American Public Health Association
- Father: Wilbur Olin Atwater

Helen Woodard Atwater (29 May 1876 – 26 June 1947) was an American writer, home economics specialist and the first full-time editor of the Journal of Home Economics.

== Life ==
Atwater was born in Somerville, Massachusetts, was raised in Middletown, Connecticut, and graduated from Smith College in 1897. For the next ten years she helped her father, Wilbur Olin Atwater, with his nutrition and colorimetry research. During this time she made extensive contacts in the U.S. Department of Agriculture (USDA). Her father died in 1907. After she wound up his estate, she was hired by the USDA in the scientific division of the Bureau of Home Economics.

Atwater served at the USDA for fourteen years until 1923. There she developed techniques of food preparation that retained nutritional values. She wrote pamphlets and books to help, primarily rural, women learn about nutrition and modified methods of food preparation. In the 1920s, she served with the Women's Joint Congressional Committee, which developed information resources for Congress on women's issues.

In 1923, the American Home Economics Association decided to hire the first full-time editor for their flagship publication, the Journal of Home Economics. Atwater was chosen, and she remained there for eighteen years until she retired in 1941. While there, she served on the White House Conference on Child Health and Protection in 1930 and the President's Conference on Home Building and Home Ownership in 1931. She was an active member of the American Public Health Association and chaired its committee on housing hygiene in 1942.

== Honors ==
Atwater was a member of the American Association for the Advancement of Science and was honored with honorary membership in both Phi Upsilon Omicron (honor society in family and consumer science) and Omicron Nu (honor society now part of Kappa Omicron Nu). In 1943, she received an honorary Doctor of Science degree from Smith College. The American Home Economics Association established an international fellowship in her name in 1947. Francine Van de Putte Gillies of Leuven, Belgium, was the first recipient.

== Selected published works ==
Atwater's published works include:

- (1900) Bread and the Principles of Bread Making Government Printing Office, Washington, D.C.
- (1903) Poultry as food Government Printing Office, Washington, D.C.
- (1929) Home Economics: The art and science of homemaking American Library Association, Chicago with Caroline Louisa Hunt
- (1917) How to Select Foods ... Government Printing Office, Washington, D.C.
