= Omicron Nu =

American home economics honor society (1912–1990)

- ΟΝ
- Founded: April 23, 1912; 114 years ago Michigan Agricultural College
- Type: Honor
- Former affiliation: PFA; ACHS
- Status: Merged
- Merge date: February 21, 1990
- Successor: Kappa Omicron Nu
- Emphasis: Home Economics
- Scope: National
- Publication: Home Economics FORUM
- Chapters: 50
- Members: 65,000+ lifetime
- Headquarters: East Lansing, Michigan; United States

Omicron Nu (ΟΝ) was an American honor society for home economics. It was established at Michigan Agricultural College in 1912. In 1925, Omicron Nu became a founding member of the Professional Panhellenic Association, a predecessor to the Professional Fraternity Association (PFA). Omicron Nu joined the Association of College Honor Societies in 1951.

In 1990, Omicron Nu merged with Kappa Omicron Phi to form Kappa Omicron Nu.

== History ==
Maude Gilchrist, dean of home economics at Michigan Agricultural College (now Michigan State University), founded Omicron Nu on April 16, 1912. Omicron Nu was an honor society whose purpose was to advance and promote leadership, research, and scholarship in the field of home economics for the well-being of families and individuals around the world.

Its original members were six faculty members and eleven student members, including.

- Faculty: Hazel Berg (Layer), Louise Freyhofer, Maude Gilchrist, Agnes Hunt (Cade), Lillian Peppard, and Grace Stevens
- Students: Fernell Allen, Verna Allen, Vera Coffeen, Alida Dearborn, Josephine Hart, Bessie G. Howe, Lillian M. Mullenbach, Helen Louise Norton, Lutie E. Robinson, Helen M. Sheldon, and Philena E. Smith

In 1925 Omicron Nu became a founding member of the Professional Panhellenic Association, a predecessor to today's Professional Fraternity Association. Omicron Nu joined the Association of College Honor Societies in 1951 and was readmitted in 1968. It was also a member of the Home Economic Association's Coordinating Council of Home Economic Honor Societies.

In 1989, Omicron Nu began merger discussions with Kappa Omicron Phi, another home economic honor society that was also a member of the Association of College Honor Societies. The idea of merging developed during a strategic planning session for the administrative leadership of the two organizations. Phi Upsilon Omicron, an honor society for the field of family and consumer science was invited to the merger discussions but declined to participate.

Omicron Nu and Kappa Omicron Phi merged into Kappa Omicron Nu on February 21, 1990, but took three years to consolidate into a single administrative office. At the time of the merger, Omicron Nu had 65,000 members, fifty active chapters, five alumni chapters, and a national alumni chapter.

== Symbols and traditions ==
The Greek letters Ο and Ν in the society's name represent the Greek words oikos (house) and nemein (to manage), combined to mean "to manage a house".

Omicron Nu had a pin or key for active members that consisted of the Greek letter Ο superimposed over the Greek letter Ν. The letter Nu was embellished. The society did not have pledge pin.

The society published The Omicron Nu quarterly newsletter. It also published the journal Home Economics FORUM.

== Membership ==
Juniors and seniors who had a B average and ranked in the top fifteen and twenty percent of their class, respectively, were eligible to join Omicron Nu.

== Activities ==
Omicron Nu provided leadership training for its student members at its biennial conclave. Some Omicron Nu chapters awarded a cup to the freshman girl who had the best academic performance in home economics. Another chapter held an open house to encourage high school students to study home economics in college.

During World War I, the Eta chapter volunteered with the Women's War Work Committee and the Student Council of Defense. During the 1918 influenza epidemic, members of the University of Wisconsin Madison volunteers to assist a local doctor and provided meals for sick students on campus.

By 1969, Omicron Nu awarded two graduate students the Eileen C. Maddox Fellowship, each worth $2,000 ($17,559 in today's money) and four doctoral research fellowships worth $2,250 ($19,754 in today's money). Both fellowships were for two years.

== Governance ==
The society was managed by a grand council that included a representative from each active chapter and an executive committee consisting of five officers. In the later 1920s, the grand council met biannually, with the executive committee meeting and conducting business in the alternate years. Grand council meetings were hosted by the various chapters.

== Chapters ==
Omicron Nu charterd 56 chapters before its 1990 merger.

== Notable members ==
- Helen W. Atwater, home economics specialist and the first full-time editor of the Journal of Home Economics
- Della Prell Darknell Campbell, dean of girls at North Central High School in Spokane, Washington
- Rajammal P. Devadas, nutritionist and chancellor of Avinashilingam Institute for Home Science and Higher Education for Women,
- Maude Gilchrist (Alpha), botanist, college professor, and dean at Illinois Women's College and Michigan Agricultural College
- Irma Hannah Gross, home economist and professor at Michigan State University
- Ruth Tanbara (Lambda), Japanese American community leader in Saint Paul, Minnesota
- Mildred Bertha Thurow Tate, sociologist, educator, and the first Dean of Women at Virginia Tech

== See also ==
- Professional fraternities and sororities
