= Mildred Bertha Thurow Tate =

American rural sociologist and university dean

Mildred B. Thurow Tate
- Born: November 17, 1904; Macksville, Kansas, United States
- Died: March 10, 1996 (aged 91); Blacksburg, Virginia, United States
- Resting place: West Hill Cemetery; Russell County, Virginia, United States
- Education: BS, 1927, Kansas State Agricultural College; MS, 1929, Kansas State Agricultural College; PhD, 1933, Cornell University
- Known for: Appointed as the first Dean of Women and the head of the Department of Home Economics at Virginia Polytechnic Institute and State University
- Spouse(s): Leland Burdine Tate, PhD
- Children: Elise (Thurow Tate) Daniels
- Scientific career
- Fields: Rural sociology Sociology; Home economics
- Workplaces: Wayne State University; Virginia Polytechnic Institute and State University
- Thesis: A Study of Selected Factors in Family Life as Described in Autobiographies (1935)
- Doctoral advisor: Dwight Sanderson, PhD

Mildred Bertha Thurow Tate (1904–1996) was an American rural sociologist, educator, and advocate for women's education. She was one of the first women to obtain a PhD in rural sociology from Cornell University and was appointed the first Dean of Women at the Virginia Polytechnic Institute and State University.

== Early life and education ==
Mildred Thurow was born on November 17, 1904, in Macksville, Kansas, to Carl G. Thurow and Mary E. Simon Thurow.

She graduated from Kansas State Agricultural College with a BS in 1927 and an MS in 1929. The title of her MS thesis was "Study of the Leisure of Fifty Kansas Farm Women". In 1933, Thurow graduated from Cornell University with a PhD in rural sociology. Dwight Sanderson, Professor of Rural Sociology, was her doctoral advisor. Her dissertation was titled "A Study of Selected Factors in Family Life as Described in Autobiographies". her time at Cornell University is notable as she was one of the first women to graduate with a PhD from the Department of Rural Sociology, and she was also awarded a prestigious fellowship from the Social Science Research Council which funded the last year of her dissertation research.

During her graduate studies, Thurow was also affiliated with the University of Iowa, though her degrees from institutions of higher education were only awarded by Kansas State Agricultural College and Cornell University.

== Career ==
Thurow started her career as a specialist in parent education and family life at the Merrill Palmer Skillman Institute at Wayne State University in Detroit, Michigan. The institute was founded in 1920 and focused on research and training in child development. It was one of the first institutes dedicated to this field and continues to be at the forefront of research in this topic.

In 1937, Thurow Tate (she married in 1935) was hired at Virginia Polytechnic Institute and State University to develop the home economics program. Prior to her tenure at the University, the Department of Home Economics had been disbanded. The department was soon re-established after her hire due to her development of a rigorous academic curriculum as well as her recruitment of faculty to implement the curriculum. In 1939, Thurow Tate was promoted to full professor and appointed the first Dean of Women. As Dean of Women, she was instrumental in the building of Hillcrest Hall, the first on-campus housing for female students at the University in 1940. Thurow Tate served as the Dean of Women until 1947, though she remained a professor at the University until her retirement in 1958.

Thurow Tate jump-started her publication record while at Cornell University. A pared-down version of her dissertation was published in Social Forces in 1934, it was titled "A Study of Selected Factors in Family Life as Described in Life History Material." In the same year, she also published a report for the Cornell University Agricultural Experimental Station titled "Interests, Activities, and Problems of Rural Young Folk: Women 15 to 29 Years of Age". Her other academic publications include "A Study of the Children's Responses to Verbal Direction in Preparation for Dinner and Eating Routines as Evidenced by Five Minute Sampling Records over a Period of Six Weeks" in 1933, "Use of Research in Courses on the Family and Marriage" in 1935, "An Objective Analysis of Family Life" also in 1935, "Sources of Material for the Master's Thesis" in 1941, and "Adjustment Problems of College Students" in 1954 with Virginia Anne Musick. Her 1954 article was also published in Social Forces.

Thurow Tate's first book was published in 1961 and was titled Home Economics as a Profession. A second edition was published in 1969. She also co-authored Everyday Living with Jessie Wooten Harris, PhD, and Ida Adelaide Anders, PhD, in 1944, and Family Clothing with Oris Glisson, PhD, in 1961.

Beyond her publications, Thurow Tate received multiple honors. Her selected honors include: Home Economics Hall of Fame, Kansas State College; Chairman, Virginia Commission on Higher Education; President, Virginia Home Economics Association, as well as membership in Phi Kappa Phi, Sigma Xi, Phi Lambda Theta, Omicron Nu, and Delta Zeta.

== Personal life ==
Thurow Tate married Leland Burdine Tate, PhD, on June 10, 1935, in the District of Columbia. They met at Cornell University where they both received PhDs. Leland B. Tate was a professor of rural sociology at Virginia Polytechnic Institute. He also served as the president of the Southern Sociological Society in 1953. They had one daughter, Elise.
