= Leonard Peairs =

American entomologist

Leonard Marion Peairs (5 June 1886 – 29 January 1956) was an American economic entomologist and was a professor of entomology at the West Virginia University.

== Biography ==
Peairs was born in Lawrence, Kansas. He graduated from Kansas State Agricultural College (1905) and obtained a master's degree in 1907. He then worked as a graduate assistant at the University of Illinois and became an assistant professor of entomology at the Maryland Agricultural College in 1908. Two years later he returned to the Kansas State Agricultural College and became a professor of entomology at the University of West Virginia in 1912 and worked there until his retirement. He collaborated with Dwight Sanderson and helped the latter revise the Insect Pests of Farm, Garden and Orchard in 1921 and with others subsequently. He obtained a PhD from the University of Chicago in 1925 working under Dwight Sanderson with a thesis on the relationship of temperature to rate of development in insects, an area of research that he took an interest in from at least 1913. Peairs served as editor of the Journal of Economic Entomology from 1940 to 1953.

Peairs married Edith Pennington in 1915 and they had two children.
