= Abby Marlatt =

American nutritionist and civil rights activist

Abby Lindsey Marlatt, Ph.D. (December 5, 1916 – March 3, 2010) was a social justice activist and a teacher scholar committed to civic engagement. While a professor at the University of Kentucky (UK) in Lexington, Kentucky, she became the center of controversy at UK in the mid-1960s over anti-war protests and whether the university could censor her in her role as a public intellectual. She was honored for her work by many academic, professional and community organizations including the National Conference for Community and Justice, and she was inducted into the Kentucky Civil Rights Hall of Fame in 2001.

== Early life and education ==
Born on December 5, 1916, and raised in Manhattan, Kansas, Abby Marlatt grew up in a family that had long roots in higher education. She was the daughter and only child of Frederick and Annie Marlatt, the granddaughter of Washington and Julia Marlatt and the niece of Abby Lillian Marlatt. Marlatt attended Kansas State College, graduating in 1938 with a bachelor's degree in home economics, specializing in dietetics and institution management. While she was in college, she became very active in the student Christian movement, serving as chairman of the college chapter of the YWCA. She recalled in an interview with Betsy Brinson that one of the highlights of her college career was a summer service project in New York City where she served as an assistant manager in the Allen Matthew House on West 11th Street, a settlement house for working-class girls where they learned to plan and cook meals together.

To qualify as a dietician she went to the University of California at Berkeley as an intern. She finished her internship earning her certificate in 1941 having taken some graduate work as well. Dr. Agnus Fay Morgan, who was head of the department, hired her as a teaching assistant so that she could work toward her Ph.D. There she worked with the American Friends Service Committee and the Fellowship of Reconciliation, and she was trained in non-violent direct action by Bayard Rustin.

== Career ==
=== Early career as university professor ===
While she was ABD she was hired as an assistant professor in Foods and Nutrition at Kansas State University in 1945. Only two years later, she had finished her dissertation – her research focused on nutrition and dietary habits of school children – and earned her Ph.D. in nutrition and food science in 1947.

In 1953–54 she took a sabbatical and served as a visiting professor at the Beirut College for Women, by then offering four-year degrees for women in Lebanon (and now a member college of the Lebanese American University). The school had been founded by the American Protestant Mission to help develop education in the region, and during the summer the students would serve as interns to visit local villages to teach girls and women basic literacy, mother-child healthcare and handicrafts.

While at Kansas State she served on the local board of the YWCA and with her help, students who were members of the YMCA and the YWCA planned a sit-in at lunch counters nearby campus.

Soon after earning her tenure and becoming an associate professor at Kansas State, Dr. Marlatt was hired in 1956 at the University of Kentucky's College of Agriculture to be the inaugural Director of the School of Home Economics. She was hired at a senior level with tenure in the Department of Nutrition and Food Science.

=== Civil rights movement in Lexington, Kentucky ===
Marlatt directed the School of Home Economics at the University of Kentucky for several years without incident. By 1959 she had begun to openly participate with college students and local Black civil rights organizations in peaceful protests and sit-ins in downtown Lexington to desegregate public accommodations there. Her first experience was in the late spring of 1959 when she, as a faculty sponsor for the campus chapter, worked with Charles Smith of the Lexington YWCA branch (which had an integrated coffee shop at the time) to try to bring a racially mixed group to a small restaurant at the corner of Columbia and Rose Streets, nearby campus. They were refused seating, and even after they spoke with the manager, the group of white students and local Black activists were thrown out of the eatery.

In the summer of 1959, members of the university chapters of the YWCA and YMCA along with youth from the NAACP chapter (primarily those attending Dunbar High School) started the Lexington chapter of Congress of Racial Equality (CORE). Julia Lewis, then a registered nurse working at Eastern State Hospital, was recruited by the president of the Lexington chapter of NAACP, Audrey Grevious, to serve as the president. Dr. Marlatt served as secretary. The CORE members would send out negotiating teams of one man and one woman to talk to store managers about their policies that denied equal access to all. And they organized sit-ins at lunch counters in the variety stores in downtown Lexington with teams of at least three and up to six people who would attempt to sit and order. If they weren't served as a group, they would sit for a designated length of time - and if only the whites were served, they would try to share their food with their partners.

Betsey Brinson, oral historian: How about the university administration and your colleagues? How were they receiving you in terms of your involvement with all of this? Abby Marlatt: I felt that if my involvement were out of school hours that it was my privilege to do as I felt I needed to do. Uhmm, the people, uhmm, in this school, some of them were sympathetic to what I was doing but not sympathetic to the point that they would join me. Others were very antagonistic and felt that I was damaging the school and that they really wanted to distance themselves from me because of this. ... Dr. Dickey was the president at that point and I was called into his office one day. He said that, he thought I should be aware that my activities were impacting negatively on the finances of the university because of activities of some of the faculty and students against businesses downtown.

By 1961 they had a large racially mixed dinner meeting at which James Farmer, co-founder of CORE and the organizer of the 1961 Freedom Rides, spoke. However, by 1968 the racially mixed CORE chapter ended when whites were told to leave from one the meetings.

The church members who had been active in the CORE and NAACP protests organized as the Lexington Committee on Religion and Human Rights. They met at the YMCA on the corner of West Second and Jefferson Streets. Dr. Marlatt worked in this racially mixed group together with Joe Graves, Kentucky Civil Rights Hall of Fame 2003, and Harry Sykes who in 1963 became Lexington's first Black city commissioner and in 1968 founded the Lexington Fayette County Urban League.

=== Vietnam War protests and controversy as professor ===
By the 1960s she encountered problems with the school's administration and board of trustees. She was demoted from her position as dean of the College of Home Economics in 1963 by UK president Dr. Frank Graves Dickey. What specifically led to her being investigated were two major incidents:

1. publishing in the University of Kentucky's student newspaper (Kentucky Kernel) in March 1962 an open letter titled "Informed Citizenry Called the Basis of Democracy" and signed as the Dean of the School of Home Economics in which she advocated an anti-war philosophy of the conscientious objector; and,
2. standing in front of Lexington churches in the summer of 1962 to distribute handbills encouraging citizens to dissent by avoiding signing up for the draft and not paying taxes

The university's board of trustees recommended that Dr. Marlatt be fired for incompetence. By that winter the Kentucky Civil Liberties Union and the University of Kentucky branch of the American Association of University Professors had taken up the case. This angered the dean of the College of Agriculture, who convinced President Dickey to remove her as director of the School of Home Economics effective September 1, 1963.

A Unitarian, Marlatt was also a member of the ACLU. Because Marlatt was a tenured professor at UK, she was ultimately unable to be fired from her position as a faculty member, though in an oral interview she mentions being removed from teaching duties for a year.

In 2001, Marlatt was recognized by the Kentucky Commission on Human Rights.

== Academic professional affiliations ==
- Kappa Omicron Nu (1938–2010, life member)
- American Association of University Professors (1940–2004); served on the International Committee
- American Association of Family and Consumer Sciences (1946–2004); Ohio-Kentucky representative, Awards Committee, Food and Nutrition Division Secretary, Chair of Association of Administrators of Home Economics
- American Dietetic Association (1943–2004)
- Kansas Dietetic Association (1943–1956), president
- Sigma Xi (science and engineering) (1945–2004); University of Kentucky Chapter President, vice president
- Phi Upsilon Omicron (1957–2010); honorary member, President Iota Alumni chapter
- Kentucky Council on Aging (1962–85); charter member
- Kentucky Nutrition Council (1965–1985); vice chair, treasurer, secretary, Planning Committee for Nutrition Seminar
- Land Grant Institutions (1978–1983); served on review committee on role of women in developing countries
- Omicron Delta Kappa (1980–2010); honorary member
- Nursing Home Ombudsman Program (1981–2004); Professional Advisory Panel
- Fayette County Commission on Community Services for Older Persons (1982); committees on long-range planning and nutrition

== Local civic activism ==
=== National and international organizations ===
- Congress of Racial Equality (1959–1968), organizer of Lexington chapter
- United Nations Association (1960–2010), board member of the Bluegrass chapter
- YWCA

=== Statewide organizations ===
- Kentucky Civil Liberties Union (1956–2010)
- League of Women Voters (1986–2004?); board
- Legislative Research Commission, Advisory Committee of Senior Citizens, established by the Kentucky General Assembly (1988–2004?); chair of Consumer Affairs (Health Human Services), commission chair and vice chair

=== Local agencies and organizations ===
- Lexington Commission on Religion and Human Rights (1960), organizer
- Community Action Council (1965–2004?), officer and board member
- Micro-City Government (1972–2001), organizer, fund raiser, secretary, treasurer, board member
- Emerson Center, Inc. Non-profit housing (1974–2004?); chair, vice chair, board member
- Bluegrass Community Services, Inc. (sponsor of nutrition projects for elderly) (1976–2004?); board member and chair
- University of Kentucky Donovan Scholars Program (1985–2004?); advisory board chair, Scholarship Committee, Dulcimer group (1989–2004?)
- Ethics Commission of Lexington Fayette Urban County Government (1995–2001); vice chair, representative of League of Women Voters
- Retired Seniors Volunteer Program (1997–2001); mentor and tutor at Harrison Elementary School

== Honors and awards ==
- Algernon Sydney Sullivan Medallion, 1985 (given by the University of Kentucky to a citizen of Kentucky for exemplifying a spirit of service to others)
- National Conference for Community & Justice, 1985 (Brotherhood/Sisterhood Award)
- University of Kentucky Women's Forum Sarah B. Holmes Award for service to women, 1996
- Kentucky House of Representatives, 1999 (citation as model of good citizenship for continuing work with youth programs)
- University of Kentucky College of Human Environmental Sciences Hall of Fame, 2000 (charter recipient)
- Central Kentucky Civil Liberties Union, 2001 (Distinguished Service Award)
- Kentucky Civil Rights Hall of Fame, 2001
- Kentucky Council on Aging, 2001 (Gaines Center Humanities Award)
- Lexington Fayette Urban County Government Senior Citizens Hall of Fame, 2002
- Kentucky Association of Family and Consumer Sciences, 2002 (Kentucky affiliate's award for Community Service)
- University of Kentucky Wiley-Berger Award for Volunteer Service, 2004

== Personal life and death ==
In 2004 when supporting Dr. Marlatt's nomination for the Wiley-Berger Award, Sean Wright, Director of the Black and Williams Neighborhood Center said that as a young African American male he had watched her "sit with, fight for and advocate changes many times in a predominantly all African American venue showed her character and individuality. Dr. Abby Marlatt is truly a Drum Major in the Band of Justice."

== Other resources ==
Marlatt's oral interviews, collected and archived for the Kentucky Civil Rights Project, have been preserved online. Documents and memos regarding the inquiry into Marlatt by Dr. Frank Dickey and the board of trustees are preserved online at the UK's academic governance site and will prove useful to researchers and those unfamiliar with the case. Short biographies can also be found in:

- Talbert, Charles Gano. The University of Kentucky: The Maturing Years. Lexington: University of Kentucky Press, 1965.
