= Michigan State University Housing =

Michigan State University Housing is a large and complex network of housing for students and faculty of Michigan State University. Most of the housing is in the form of residence halls on the school's campus, but there are also university apartments, fraternity and sorority housing, and free-standing housing for grad students, faculty and staff.

The residence halls are arranged into five neighborhoods; Brody Neighborhood, North Neighborhood, South Neighborhood, River Trail Neighborhood, and East Neighborhood.

The university expanded its housing greatly in the 1950s and 1960s, resulting in what is now the largest residence hall system in the United States. 18,200 students live in MSU's 27 undergraduate halls, one graduate hall, and three apartment villages. Each hall has its own hall government, with representatives in the Residence Halls Association (RHA). In total there are 245 buildings for housing and food service, as well as 74 other buildings that help support the housing complex system. Despite the size and extent of on-campus housing, 58% of students live off-campus.

== Residence halls ==
=== North Neighborhood ===
North Neighborhood, which includes Red Cedar neighborhood and West Circle neighborhood, was designed by the Malcomson, Calder & Hammond Architectural Firm, and was built throughout the 1930s and 1940s. This was built as one of the nine Public Works Administration (PWA) building projects on campus in that era. Built on "sacred ground", the original campus growth sprang from this area. The ivy-covered halls are of a Tudor-style design, with high-pitched gabled roofs, metal casement windows, slate roofs, and Renaissance detailing, and recall medieval estates.

Currently all but Yakeley are co-ed, though the West Circle complex was originally all female. Reflecting that fact, each of the West Circle halls is named for a woman who made significant contributions to Michigan State.

Campbell Hall

North Neighborhood is composed of residence halls from both West Circle and Red Cedar:

The West Circle neighborhood is made up of six buildings:

- Mary Anne Mayo (1931) - houses 250 students
- Louise H. Campbell (1939) - houses approximately 300 students
- Linda E. Landon (1947) - houses approximately 300 students
- Elida Yakeley-Maude Gilchrist (1947) - houses a combined 500 students
- Sarah Langdon Williams (1937) - houses 160 residents

The Red Cedar Complex is close to the geographic center of campus. Snyder and Phillips Halls contain classrooms and are home to the Residential College in Arts & Humanities.

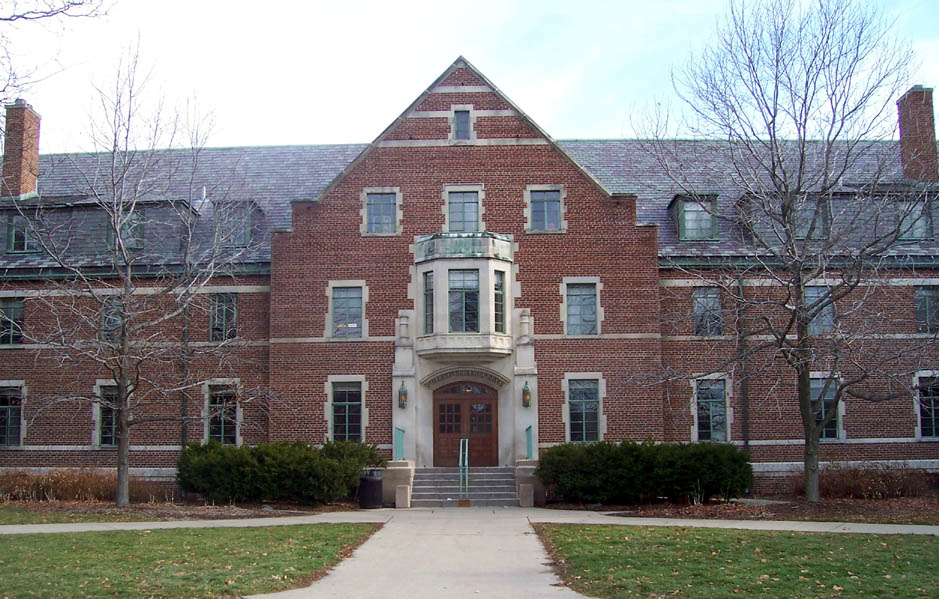
Snyder-Phillips Hall

- Stevens T. Mason/Theophilus Abbot Halls
- Jonathan L. Snyder/T. Glenn Phillips Halls

==== Mary Mayo Hall ====
Mary Mayo Hall was built in 1931 as the first residence hall in the West Circle complex. It is named after Mary Mayo, a school teacher and wife of a Civil War veteran who was also an active member of the Grange. Mayo wanted her daughter to be able to attend a collegiate institution, but MAC (Michigan Agricultural College, former name for Michigan State University) did not then have a program for women. Through her speeches and involvement with the Grange, Mary Mayo became an advocate for a women's program and women's housing at MAC. Her persistence was rewarded in 1896 when the first women's course was officially created.

Mayo Hall reopened in the fall of 2009 after a 15-month renovation which included upgrades to the plumbing and electrical systems, new furniture, and many cosmetic changes on its interior. Even with all of the changes, every effort was made to preserve Mayo's historic architecture and sacred grounds.

Mary Mayo Hall is the oldest residence hall still being used as such, and it has long been rumored that the building is haunted. There are various stories to explain the ghostly presence that many residents have felt, though no concrete evidence exists to show that these stories are much more than tall tales.

=== River Trail Neighborhood ===
The River Trail Neighborhood is south of the Red Cedar River near the Shaw Lane and Bogue Street intersection. It is located near the Business College Complex, the MSU College of Law, the College of Osteopathic Medicine, the College of Human Medicine, the College of Veterinary Medicine and the Wharton Center for Performing Arts. The River Trail Neighborhood includes Karl H. and Irma N. McDonel Hall, Robert S. Shaw Halls, Floyd W. Owen Hall (no longer a graduate only hall) and Sarah Van Hoosen Hall.

==== McDonel Hall ====
Part of the East Complex of residence halls at MSU, McDonel Hall provides housing to almost 900 students, many of whom are international students participating in MSU's Study Abroad Program. With an emphasis on the appreciation of international culture, McDonel Hall is home to the International Language and Cultural Residence on the third floor of West McDonel Hall; La Casa, a special Spanish language speaking floor; and the Arabic Language Instruction Flagship Program.

Typically known for its more mature atmosphere, McDonel Hall provides housing for transfer students and students who have completed their first year in twelve coed-by-suite floors, including two quiet floors. McDonel also features music practice rooms, a Sparty's Retail Store, recreation area, sand volleyball court and a basketball half court.

=== East Neighborhood ===
East Neighborhood halls are located just off of Hagadorn Road near the East IM and intramural fields. They are close to the Business College, the MSU College of Law, the College of Osteopathic Medicine, the College of Human Medicine, and the College of Veterinary Medicine. They are a five-minute walk to the Wharton Center.

Holmes, Hubbard, and Akers Halls all contain classrooms, and Holmes is home to Lyman Briggs College.

The East College is made up of:

==== Other East Neighborhood halls ====
- John C. Holmes East and West Halls
- Forest H. Akers East and West Halls (Akers-Hubbard Complex)
- Bela K. Hubbard North and South Halls (Akers-Hubbard Complex)

=== South Neighborhood ===
Case, Wonders, Holden and Wilson halls are located in the midst of the athletic venues situated across from the intramural fields and near Spartan Stadium, IM Sports West, Munn Ice Arena, the Smith Center, and the Breslin Student Events Center. All of the buildings in South complex contain classrooms, and Case Hall is the home of James Madison College.

The South Complex is made up of:

- Albert H. and Sarah A. Case North/South Halls (1961)
- Wallace K. and Grace Wonders North/South Halls (1963)
- James and Lynelle Holden East/West Halls (1967)
- Mathilda R. and Alfred G. Wilson East/West Halls

In addition to a newly renovated Holden Hall, Case Hall's dining area has been renovated to match the Brody Square dining center located in Brody Hall and the Gallery in Snyder/ Phillips Hall.

=== Brody Neighborhood ===
Brody Neighborhood is a group of six student housing buildings as well as the University Village apartments located at the far northwestern corner of the campus just north of the Red Cedar River and bordered by Grand River Avenue and Harrison Road. Traditionally, the Brody buildings were limited to freshmen (other than RAs). It is located a short walk from the Breslin Student Events Center. The Brody complex comprises six residence halls:

- W. G. Armstrong Hall
- Liberty Hyde Bailey Hall
- Claude S. Bryan Hall
- Kenyon L. Butterfield Hall
- Lloyd C. Emmons Hall
- Howard C. Rather Hall

At the center of the complex stands Clark L. Brody Hall, home to Brody Square — a unique dining destination for students and one of the largest non-military dining facilities in the country — and many classrooms, offices, and meeting spaces. All residence halls in the Brody Neighborhood feature community-style bathrooms. The halls also feature the biggest student rooms on campus and parking just outside the buildings.

==== Brody Neighborhood renovations ====
The newly constructed Brody Square appears to be a key factor in students' living arrangement plans for the coming school year. Renovations began on Brody Hall in January 2009. Among other upgrades, improvements included redesigned entrances, new dining area, a two-story main lounge, and improved community spaces on all floors. Phase I was completed in July 2010 with final renovations completed July 2011 and ready for students and staff for the Fall 2011 academic year. During the 2010–2011 academic year, Emmons hall was closed for remodeling and structure updates and resumed operations in the Fall 2011 academic year. Bailey and Rather Halls renovations were completed in May 2012. Bryan and Armstrong Halls were closed from mid-2012 to mid-2013, and opened for the Fall 2013 academic year. The last to be renovated, Butterfield Hall, was opened for the Fall 2014 academic year.

== University apartments ==
Michigan State owns and operates two apartment complexes, Spartan Village and Cherry Lane. A third complex, University Village, underwent recent redevelopment. When it reopened in August 2007, it offered new apartment-style housing for upper-level undergrads. The university owns in total 1,800 one- and two-bedroom apartments. As of Fall 2012, The Cherry Lane Apartments have been demolished and the area has not undergone any new building. Instead, an open field with grass and trees lies in its place to the west of Holden Hall. University Village is a part of the Brody Neighborhood as well.
