= Irma Hannah Gross =

American home economist (1892–1980)

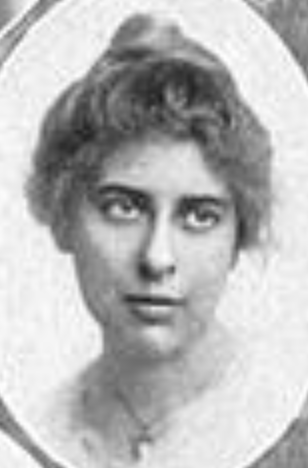
- Irma Hannah Gross, from the 1915 yearbook of the University of Chicago
- Born: July 21, 1892; Omaha, Nebraska
- Died: January 25, 1980 (aged 87); La Mesa, California
- Occupations: Home economist, college professor

Irma Hannah Gross (July 21, 1892 – January 25, 1980) was an American home economist and college professor. She was a professor at Michigan State University from 1921 to 1959, and was considered a "home management pioneer" for her decades of scholarship in the field.

== Early life and education ==
Gross was born in Omaha, Nebraska, the daughter of David Gross and Addie Gladstone Gross. Her family was Jewish. Her mother was a teacher and school principal in Omaha. Her father was a grocer and was born in Hungary, as were her maternal grandparents.

Gross graduated from the University of Chicago in 1915, with a degree in domestic science, having studied with Marion Talbot and Hazel Kyrk. She was a member of Phi Beta Kappa. She earned a master's degree from the University of Chicago in 1924, and a Ph.D. in 1931. Her master's thesis was titled "A survey of the food habits in a Hungarian Mining Town". Her doctoral dissertation was on "The Development of Family Thrift Attitudes and Practices".

== Career ==
Gross taught at Omaha Central High School for six years after college. She was a professor at Michigan State University from 1921 to 1959, and head of the school's Department of Home Management and Child Development from 1935 to 1958. She was active in the American Association of University Women (AAUW), and the organization named a travel grant for her in 1955.

Gross was named an Ellen H. Richards Fellow by the American Home Economics Association (AHEA). She was chair of the Michigan branch of AHEA in 1939 and 1940, and from 1949 to 1951 she was national president of Omicron Nu, an honor society for home economics students.

In retirement, Gross continued to present papers at the Western Regional Home Management Conference through the 1960s and 1970s. She was also an adjunct professor of home economics at San Diego State College. In 1980, soon after her death, she became the first recipient of the AHEA Foundation's Distinguished Service Award.

== Publications ==
- "Practice Home Values" (1928)
- "The development of family thrift attitudes and practices" (1934)
- "A Study of Children's Wardrobes" (1935, with Mary Pennington)
- Home Management (1938, 1940, with Mary E. Lewis)
- "A Study of Three Methods of Research in Home Management" (1940)
- Home Management in Theory and Practice (1947, with Elizabeth Walbert Crandall)
- "A Home Management Yardstick" (1950, with Esther Everett)
- Management for Modern Families (1954, 1963, with Elizabeth Walbert Crandall; 1973, 1980 with Marjorie Knoll)
- Potentialities of Women in the Middle Years (1956, editor)
- "Automation and the Family" (1957)
- Fatigue of homemakers with young children (1959, with Elizabeth Weigand)

== Personal life and legacy ==
Gross lived in California and traveled in Europe during her retirement. She died in 1980, at the age of 87, in La Mesa, California. Michigan State University Archives holds a small collection of her papers.
