= Ruth Tanbara =

Japanese American community leader (1907–2008)

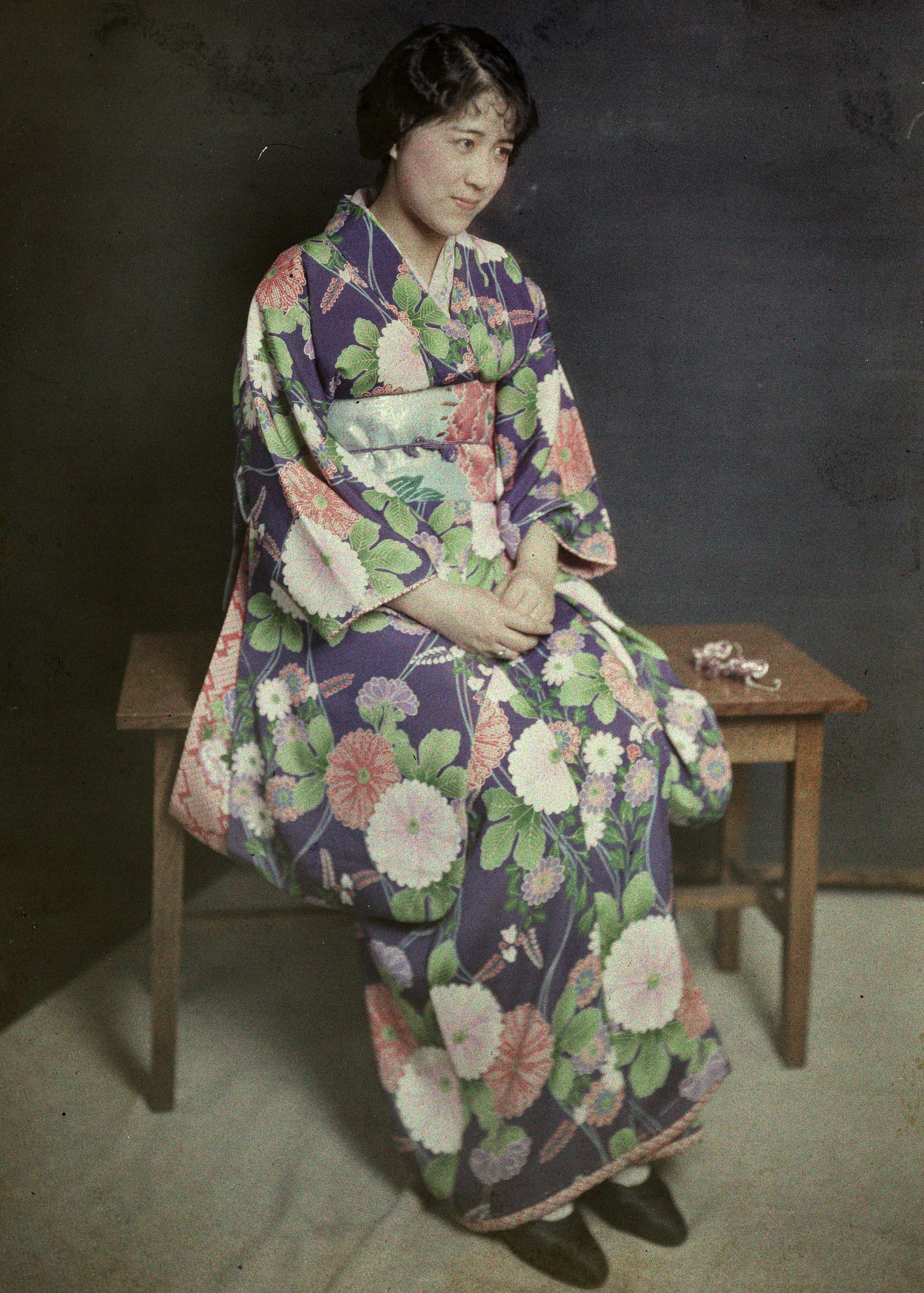
Ruth Nomura Tanbara

Ruth Tanbara (née Nomura; October 15, 1907, in Portland, Oregon – January 4, 2008, in Afton, Minnesota) was a Japanese American community leader in Saint Paul, Minnesota. From Oregon, she was the first Japanese American graduate of what is now Oregon State University.

== Early life ==
Born to Frank Jiro and Kiyo Takeda Nomura, Ruth Tokuko Nomura was one of four children, with two brothers, Howard and Paul and one sister, Elsie. Before attending college, Nomura won an essay contests for Nisei appreciation and in 1926, traveled by steamship to Japan, which she said, "enriched my life and gave me a deep appreciation for Japan." Her parents emigrated from Japan in 1903 and she was the first Japanese American to graduate from Oregon State Agricultural College in 1930 with a BA in Home Economics. While in college, Nomura was active in campus organizations, joining groups such as Phi Kappa Phi honor society, as well as serving as the Omicron Nu secretary and the Cosmopolitan Club's vice-president.

Following her college graduation from Oregon State Agricultural College, she married Earl K. Tanbara on September 16, 1935, taking the name Ruth Nomura Tanbara and they moved to the Berkeley, California. During the onset of WWII, the Tanbaras moved to Reedley, California to avoid wartime internment under Roosevelt's Executive Order 9066. Shortly after, Ruth and Earl Tanbara were formally resettled to St. Paul, Minnesota, where Ruth's brother, Paul, was living. From St. Paul, the Tanbaras assisted over 100 evacuees to leave internment camps on the West Coast and resettle in the Twin Cities area. Within this, they helped establish the St. Paul Resettlement Committee, which managed temporary housing, food, and adjustment to Minnesota's winter climate for evacuees. Following the end of the war, the Tanbaras decided to stay in St. Paul, where Ruth attended the University of Minnesota, earning her master's degree in Home Economics in 1953. During and after the war, Ruth Nomura Tanbara worked for the St. Paul YWCA for thirty years originally as a secretary, before she transitioned to teaching adult education including classes on flower arrangement and Japanese cooking.

== Later years ==
She was also active in community service. Ruth Nomura Tanbara and her husband were founding members of the Twin Cities chapter of the Japanese American Citizens League, or JACL. She was recognized by the Mayor of St. Paul, Randy Kelly, with a "Ruth Tanbara Day" on August 20, 2005, for her work on the Governor's Committee on Human Rights and the St. Paul Council of Human Relations. Aside from her work with evacuees and Japanese Americans, Ruth Nomura Tanbara was a member of the Unity Church - Unitarian in St. Paul where she arranged flowers for Sunday service for over thirty years. Ruth Nomura Tanbara was cited in Congress in March 1996 in support of Women's History Month by Hon. Martin Olav Sabo of Minnesota. She died on January 4, 2008, at the age of 100, 34 years to the day after the death of her husband, Earl Tanbara.

== See also ==
- Japanese Americans
- World War II
- Japanese American Internment
- YWCA, the Young Women's Christian Association
