= Boyer's model of scholarship =

Academic model

Boyer's model of scholarship is an academic model advocating expansion of the traditional definition of scholarship and research into four types of scholarship. It was introduced in 1990 by Ernest Boyer. According to Boyer, traditional research, or the scholarship of discovery, had been the center of academic life and crucial to an institution's advancement, but it needed to be broadened and made more flexible to include not only the new social and environmental challenges beyond the campus but also the reality of contemporary life. His vision was to change the research mission of universities by introducing the idea that scholarship needed to be redefined.

He proposed that scholarship include these four different categories:

- The scholarship of discovery that includes original research that advances knowledge (e.g., basic research);
- The scholarship of integration that involves synthesis of information across disciplines, across topics within a discipline, or across time (e.g., interprofessional education, or science communication);
- The scholarship of application (also later called the scholarship of engagement) that goes beyond the service duties of a faculty member to those within or outside the University and involves the rigor and application of disciplinary expertise, with results that can be shared with and/or evaluated by peers (i.e., Cooperative State Research, Education, and Extension Service, or science diplomacy); and
- The scholarship of teaching and learning that involves the systematic study of teaching and learning processes. It differs from scholarly teaching in that it requires the work be made public, made available for peer review and critique according to accepted standards, and should be reproducible and extensible by other scholars.

Boyer's model has been embraced across academia with occasional refinement, such as specific applications for different disciplines.
