= Della Prell Darknell Campbell =

High school dean (1889-?)

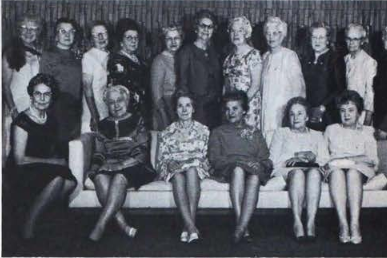
Charter and 50 year members who were present to celebrate the Golden Anniversary of Gamma Eta chapter were, front, left to right, Ruth Cresswell Kettunen, Bernadine Wiese Helton, May Springer Cornwell, Ione Anderson Funk, Margaret Beinhort Brunton, Avis Corey Nolte, Annabel Wells Leach; back, Belle Wenz Dirstine, Olga Edwins Fritzberg, Dorothy Jacobs Goettge, Hazel Huffman Greer, Carrie Ott Rendle, Anna Scott King, Esther Eiffert, Charlotte Davies King, Elva Carey Worthen, Wilma Porter Yoder and Della Prell Campbell, all Gamma Eta Washington State

Della Prell Darknell Campbell (née Prell; December 22, 1889 – died after 1971) was an American educator. She was the Dean of girls at North Central High School in Spokane, Washington.

== Early life ==
Della Prell was born on December 22, 1889, in Brandon, Wisconsin, the daughter of John and Augusta Prell.

She graduated from Washington State University in 1919 and was part of the Gamma Eta Chapter. She was present at the 50 years celebration of the Gamma Eta chapter in Pullman, Washington in 1971.

== Career ==
Della Prell Darknell was the Dean of girls at North Central High School (Spokane, Washington). She was active in field of Home Economics.

She was a member of Omicron Nu, American Association of University Women, White Cross, National Association of Administrative Women, National Education Association, Kappa Kappa Gamma.

She retired in 1957 and moved to Long Beach, California.

== Personal life ==
Prell moved to Washington in 1908, and lived at 1418 W. Riverside, Spokane, Washington.

In 1922, she married Ralph Milton Darknell, a banker who died the following year. On June 19, 1929, she married George Oliver Campbell in Spokane, and after the wedding they moved to Big Timber, Montana. They had two sons, Robert and Thomas Prell Campbell, before they divorced.
