= Lois Lampe =

American botanist and educator (1896–1978)

Lois Lampe (March 29, 1896 – January 6, 1978) was an American botanist and educator. She taught at various levels for nearly 50 years at Ohio State University before retiring and becoming assistant professor emerita in 1966. She was a member of six scientific societies and four honors societies during her teaching career.

== Life and education ==
She was born in Fayette County, Ohio to Gertrude Leslie and Fredrick Christian Lampe on March 29, 1896. Lampe attended the Ohio State University with a major in botany and minor in zoology, earning both her Bachelor of Arts and Bachelor of Science in 1919, her Master of Science in 1922 and a Ph.D. in 1927. After she retired from teaching, she married Brenton C. Zimmerman.

She died on January 6, 1978, in London, Ohio.

== Career ==
From 1917 to 1920 Lampe was a student assistant at the Ohio State University, which started her career as an educator. Over the 46 years after serving as a student assistant, Lampe was a graduate teaching assistant (1920–1923), instructor (1923–1924, 1926–1940), and assistant professor (1940–1966). She was never promoted above assistant professor. In 1966, she became assistant professor emerita.

She was a Member of Sigma Xi and served as secretary of the organization from 1947 to 1952.

Her work were based in John H. Schaffner's ideas on phylogenetic taxonomy. Lampe's research mainly focused on the anatomy of developing vascular plants. For her master's thesis, Lampe studied twig abscission in the cottonwood tree. For her doctoral dissertation, she wrote on the development of corn endosperm. Lampe was also a notable artist who contributed to her colleague's scientific papers and displayed her art publicly. She also contributed scientific drawings to publications.

== Honors and societies ==
- Certificate of commendation in science and education from an Ohio House of Representatives member
- Fellow and member of council of the American Association for the Advancement of Science (1929-1940)
- Member of the American Genetic Association
- Member of the American Institute of Biological Sciences
- Member of Botanical Society of America
- Member of National Society of Arts and Letters
- Member of the Ohio Academy of Science
- Member of Phi Epsilon Phi (National Honorary Botanical Fraternity)
- Member of Phi Upsilon Omicron Honorary Society in Home Economics
- Member and national president (1940) of Sigma Delta Epsilon Graduate Women's Scientific Fraternity
- Member of Sigma Xi

== Partial bibliography ==
- Lampe, Lois. "Twig Abscission in Populus Deltoides" (1922).
- Lampe, Lois. "Microchemical and Morphological Study of the Developing Endosperm of Maize" (June 1931). The Botanical Gazette.
- Lampe, Lois and Stewart, Grace Anne. "Foraminifera from the Middle Devonian Bone Beds of Ohio" (1947). Journal of Paleontology.
- Lampe, Lois. "The Origin and Development of the Ohio State University with Special Reference to the Biological Sciences" (1950). The Ohio Journal of Science.
- Lampe, Lois. The History of the Plant Institute. Ohio State University, 1952.
