= Maude Gilchrist =

American botanist and academic (1861–1952)

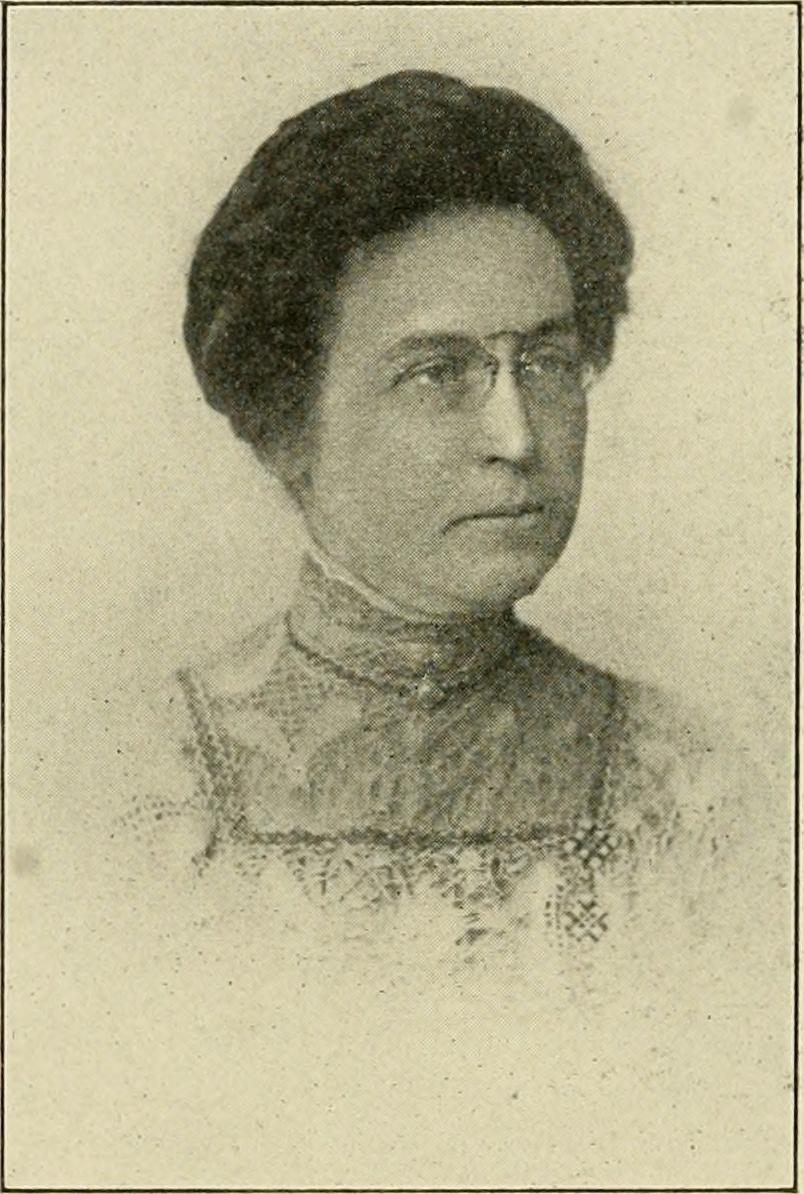
- Maude Gilchrist, from a 1915 publication
- Born: December 29, 1861; California, Pennsylvania
- Died: February 28, 1952; Fort Dodge, Iowa
- Occupation(s): Botanist, college professor, college administrator
- Relatives: Fred C. Gilchrist (brother)

Maude Gilchrist (December 29, 1861 – February 28, 1952) was an American botanist and college professor. She was dean of women at Illinois Women's College from 1897 to 1901, the first dean of home economics at Michigan Agricultural College from 1901 to 1913, and taught botany at Wellesley College and Iowa State University.

== Early life and education ==
Gilchrist was born in California, Pennsylvania, the eldest of nine children born to James Cleland Gilchrist and Hannah Cramer Gilchrist. Her father was the first principal of the Iowa State Normal School (now the University of Northern Iowa). Her younger brother Fred C. Gilchrist was a Congressman.

She was the first woman to graduate from the Iowa State Normal School, when she completed the requirements for a Bachelor of Didactics degree in 1878, at age 17; she earned a second degree in 1880. She pursued summer studies at the Woods Hole Marine Biological Laboratory in 1895, and at Göttingen University in 1896 and 1897. She earned a master's degree from the University of Michigan in 1907.

== Career ==
Gilchrist taught botany at Iowa State Normal School and at Wellesley College in the 1880s and 1890s. She organized a gymnastics club Iowa State Normal School in the mid-1880s. She was dean of women at Illinois Women's College from 1897 to 1901. From 1901 to 1913, she was the first dean of home economics at the Michigan Agricultural College. She left Michigan to be a botany professor at Wellesley College. From 1926 to 1928 she taught at Iowa State University. She spoke about her campus work to women's clubs.

Gilchrist was a fellow of the American Association for the Advancement of Science. She was one of the founders of Omicron Nu, an honors society for students in home economics, at Michigan State in 1912. Also in 1912, she was founder of the Lansing-East Lansing chapter of the American Association of University Women; the chapter named a scholarship fund in her honor in 1948.

== Publications ==
- "Effect of swaying by the wind on the formation of mechanical tissue" (1908)
- "The first three decades of home economics at Michigan State College (1896-1926)" (1947)

== Personal life and legacy ==
Gilchrist died in 1952, at the age of 90, in Fort Dodge, Iowa. Gilchrist Hall, a dormitory at Michigan State University, was named in tribute to her. A historical marker at Michigan State describes her work there.
