= T. S. Avinashilingam Chettiar =

Indian politician (1903–1991)

Member of the Indian Parliament (Rajya Sabha)
- In office 1958–1964
- Prime Minister: Jawaharlal Nehru

Member of the Indian Parliament (Lok Sabha) for Tiruppur
- In office 1952–1957
- Prime Minister: Jawaharlal Nehru

Minister of Education (Madras Presidency)
- In office 1946–1949
- Premier: Tanguturi Prakasam, O. P. Ramaswamy Reddiyar

Member of the Imperial Legislative Council of India
- In office 1934–1945

Personal details
- Born: Tiruppur Subrahmanya Avinashilingam Chettiar; 5 May 1903 Tiruppur, Madras Presidency
- Died: 21 November 1991 (aged 88) Coimbatore
- Party: Indian National Congress
- Education: Pachaiyappa's College, Madras; Madras Law College
- Occupation: Lawyer, politician

Tiruppur Subrahmanya Avinashilingam Chettiar (5 May 1903 – 21 November 1991) was an Indian lawyer, politician, freedom fighter and Gandhian. He served as the Education Minister of Madras Presidency from 1946 to 1949 and was responsible for introducing Tamil as the medium of instruction. He is also credited with having commissioned the creation of the first Tamil encyclopedia.

Avinashlingam Chettiar was born to K. Subrahmanya Chettiar at Tiruppur. He was a nephew of politician T. A. Ramalingam Chettiar. Avinashilingam had his early education at Tiruppur, Coimbatore and Madras and graduated in law from Madras Law College of the University of Madras. He joined the Indian Independence Movement and participated in the Civil Disobedience and the Quit India Movement. He also served as a member of the Imperial Legislative Council and later, education minister of Madras Presidency. He is also credited with introducing reforms in Indian society's education system.

Avinashlingam was a devout Gandhian and was a strong follower of Gandhian economics. He was also a renowned social reformer and follower of the Ramakrishna Mission. He also a father of library movement in Tamilnadu.

== Early life ==
Avinashlingam was born in Tiruppur in the then Coimbatore district on 5 May 1903 to K. Subrahmanya Chettiar, a rich and prominent merchant of Tiruppur and his wife, Palaniammal. Avinashlingam was a nephew of Indian National Congress politician and freedom fighter, T. A. Ramalingam Chettiar.

== Education ==
Avinashilingam had his schooling at Tiruppur High school, Tiruppur and London Mission High School, Coimbatore. He graduated from Pachaiyappa's College, Madras in 1923 and studied law at Madras Law College. In 1926, he commenced practice as an assistant to his uncle, Ramalingam Chettiar before entering the Indian independence movement.

== In the Indian Independence movement ==
Avinashilingam participated in the Civil Disobedience Movement and the Quit India Movement. He joined the Indian National Congress and adopted Gandhi's philosophy. He also served as the President of the Coimbatore District Congress Committee. When Gandhi visited South India in 1934 to collect money for the Harijan Welfare Fund, Avinashilingam assisted him by collecting and donating rupees two and a half lakhs to the fund. He also bore the expenses for the entire tour.

Avinashilingam was arrested four times, in 1930, 1932, 1941, and 1942. When his final prison term came to an end in 1944, he entered provincial politics and was elected to the Madras Legislative Council in 1946. He was also a member of the Imperial Legislative Council from 1935 to 1945.

== As Minister for education ==
Avinashilingam served as the Education Minister of Madras Presidency from 1946 to 1949 under premiers Tanguturi Prakasam and O. P. Ramaswamy Reddiyar. One of his most remembered acts as minister was the introduction of Tamil as the medium of instruction in secondary schools all over the Presidency. He established the Tamil Valarchi Kalagam or Tamil Academy in 1946 which created a 10-part encyclopedia, the first in Tamil, between 1954 and 1968. He was also a proponent of the empowerment of women and introduced education for senior citizens and reforms in libraries.

Avinashilingam nationalized the poems of freedom fighter, Subramania Bharati and created the professorship for Tamil and other Indian languages at the University of Madras. Thirukkural was introduced as a part of the curriculum from the 6th grade onwards.

== Later life ==
Avinashilingam was elected to the Lok Sabha from Tiruppur and served as a member of parliament from 1952 to 1957. Avinashilingam also served as the Member of the Rajya Sabha from 1958 to 1964.

In his later life, Avinashilingam served as the chairman of the committee which brought out a 10-part Children's Encyclopedia in Tamil in 1975.

Avinashilingam died on 21 November 1991 at the age of 88.

== Reforms ==
Avinashilingam was a deeply religious Hindu. Early in life, he came under the influence of Swami Shivananda and Swami Brahmananda of the Ramakrishna Mission. Inspired by the patriarchs of the mission, Avinashilingam started the Ramakrishna Vidyalaya school at Race Course, Coimbatore in 1930. Later, he moved the school to a 300-acre (1.2 km^{2}) plot of land in Perianaickenpalaiyam. Avinashilingam also worked for the upliftment of untouchables and campaigned for widow remarriage. While Dalits and low caste Hindus were not permitted to study in most schools at that time, Avinashilingam admitted children of all castes in his school. Avinashilingam also started a Home Science College in Coimbatore.

Avinashilingam was also an ardent Gandhian and was a staunch Gandhian economics. He strongly advocated that reforms in agriculture and industry should be complementary with Indian culture.

== Works ==
Avinashilingam has also written a few notable works in Tamil. One of his books is an account in Tamil about his pilgrimage to Tirukeedaram. Avinashilingam also wrote books on economics, Gandhi's education policy and the Wardha scheme.

== Honours ==
Avinashilingam was awarded the Padma Bhushan, India's third highest civilian honour for his contribution to education and literature in the year 1970. He is also the recipient of the G. D. Birla award and the 1985 Jamnalal Bajaj Award.

Avinashilingam established the Avinashilingam Home Science College for Women in 1957 In June 1988, this college became the Avinashilingam University for Women. In 2007, the Chancellor T. K. Shanmughanandam released a CD in memory of Avinashilingam Chettiar.
