= Kappa Omicron Phi =

American home economics honor society

- ΚΟΦ
- Founded: December 11, 1922; 103 years ago Northwest Missouri State College
- Type: Honor
- Former affiliation: ACHS; PPA
- Status: Merged
- Merge date: February 21, 1990
- Successor: Kappa Omicron Nu
- Emphasis: Home Economics
- Scope: National
- Colors: Gold and Red
- Symbol: Distaff
- Flower: Red Poppy
- Publication: The Distaff
- Chapters: 119
- Headquarters: United States

Kappa Omicron Phi (ΚΟΦ) was an American home economics honor society. It was established at Northwest Missouri State College in 1922. In 1990, it merged with Omicron Nu to form Kappa Omicron Nu.

== History ==
Kappa Omicron Phi was founded by six students and their teacher at Northwest Missouri State College (now Northwest Missouri State University) on December 11, 1922. Its purpose was personal development and scholastic and intellectual excellence for female students who were studying home economics. Mabel Cook, a student in the dietetics class of Hettie Margaret Anthony, suggested the formation of the society.

Anthony, the head of the school's Home Economics department, was a leader in Kappa Omicron Phi for the first fourteen years of its existence. The society added additional chapters, becoming a national organization. Later, Cook served as the society's national president. Kappa Omicron Phi was admitted to the Association of College Honor Societies in 1972. That same year, it also opened its membership to men in 1972.

In the late 1970s, the society's purpose is "to develop individuals with higher ideals of the sane living, with deeper appreciation of the sanctity of the American home, with broader social, higher intellectual, and cultural attainments."

In 1989, Kappa Omicron Nu began merger discussions with Omicron Nu, another home economic honor society that was also a member of the Association of College Honor Societies. The idea of merging developed during a strategic planning session for the administrative leadership of the two organizations. Phi Upsilon Omicron, an honor society for the field of family and consumer science was invited to the merger discussions but declined to participate.

Kappa Omicron Phi and Omicron Nu merged into Kappa Omicron Nu on February 21, 1990, but it took three years to consolidate into a single administrative office.

== Symbols and traditions ==
The Kappa Omicron Phi badge was a gold staff or spindle with the Greek letters ΚΟΦ placed vertically on a representation of wool at the top of distaff. The staff was decorated scrolls or with six pearls; a small diamond was placed at the center of the distaff. A variant included a chain that linked the staff to a small kettle that included the Greek letters of the member's chapter. The kettle also served as the society's pledge pin.

The colors of Kappa Omicron Phi were gold of the sun and red of the ember. Its flower was the red poppy.

The society's magazine was The Distaff. It was published twice a year.

== Members ==
Membership was open to students who were majoring or minoring in home economics. Members were selected based on their academics and personality.

== Governance ==
Kappa Omicron Phi was led by a National Council of eight members. The society held conclaves every two years. It awarded an efficiency plaque to the chapter with the highest score at its biennial conclave.

== Chapters ==
Kappa Omicron Phi chartered 93 chapters between 1922 and 1990. All active chapters at the time of the merger with Omicron Nu became chapters in Kappa Omicron Nu.

== See also ==
- List of Kappa Omicron Nu chapters
- Professional fraternities and sororities
