= Engaged scholarship =

Engaged scholarship is the integration of education with community development. Ethical participatory research in education is introduced to high school and undergraduate curricula to serve the mutual benefit of students, faculty, and the communities that surround and support academic institutions. Engaged scholarship is a type of education, "that can be directly applied to social problems and issues faced by individuals, local communities, organizations, practitioners, and policymakers." Engaged scholarship originates from the perceived disconnect between academic research and practical research and knowledge that can be meaningfully used to solve problems in communities.

Engaged scholarship involves several related values, such as high quality scholarship, reciprocity, identified community needs, democratization of knowledge, and boundary crossing.

== Engaged scholarship in practice ==
Engaged scholars can use social media as boundary-spanning technologies for the networking, framing, investigating, disseminating, and assessing aspects of their research so as to leverage insights from non-academic stakeholders and bridge the research-practice gap.

Engaged scholarship programs are emerging at a number of universities throughout the United States and Canada. Similarly, engaged scholarship is increasingly recognized for its ability to help elevate research quality. For example, initiatives by Research Impact Canada incentivize engaged scholarship for both faculty and students, such as through their Engaged Scholarship Award for Graduate Students.

A program at UC Berkeley integrates curricula with community-based action for students to develop awareness of the social impact of the work they do in school and their intended profession. The American Cultures Engaged Scholarship initiative includes travel-to and work-with non-profit advocacy or action-based organizations to mobilize student power to help tackle social and environmental problems in the region. More specifically, a program for incoming engineering students integrates environmental justice work with academics that explore the impact that technical actors have on issues of social justice.
