= Dwight Sanderson =

American entomologist

Ezra Dwight Sanderson (25 September 1878 – 27 September 1944) was an American entomologist and sociologist who was a professor of sociology at Cornell University. He worked in the US Department of Agriculture on pest management in cotton before becoming a professor. He published two textbooks in entomology and wrote several books on rural sociology.

Sanderson was born in Clio, Michigan, and after graduating from Michigan State College went to Cornell, receiving a BS in agriculture in 1898. He then worked as an assistant state entomologist at Maryland Agricultural College, followed by a position as professor of entomology at Texas Agricultural and Mechanical College. From 1904 he worked as a professor of zoology at New Hampshire College and served as dean of the College of Agriculture in West Virginia from 1910. After working for many years in entomology, he studied sociology and became a professor of rural sociology in 1921 after receiving a doctorate from the University of Chicago. He was a professor at Cornell University from 1918 to his retirement in 1943. He served as the 32nd president of the American Sociological Society.

He died in his Ithaca, New York home on September 27, 1944.
