= Phi Upsilon Omicron =

American honor society for family and consumer science

- ΦΥΟ
- Founded: February 10, 1909; 117 years ago University of Minnesota
- Type: Honor
- Affiliation: ACHS
- Former affiliation: PPA
- Status: Active
- Emphasis: Family and Consumer Science
- Scope: International
- Member badge
- Colors: Cream, Gold, and Violet
- Flower: Violet
- Publication: The Candle
- Chapters: 61
- Members: 97,000 lifetime
- Nickname: Phi U
- Headquarters: P.O. Box 50970; Bowling Green, Kentucky 42102-4270; United States
- Website: phiu.org

Phi Upsilon Omicron (ΦΥΟ), sometimes called Phi U, is a scholastic honor society that recognizes academic achievement among students in the field of family and consumer science. It was established in 1909 at the University of Minnesota.

== History ==
Phi Upsilon Omicron was founded at the University of Minnesota on February 10, 1909, as an honor society for students of home economics, now called family and consumer sciences. It was admitted to the Association of College Honor Societies in 1979. It is a former member of the Professional Fraternity Association.

The society has an Educational Foundation that presents 28 undergraduate scholarships and eight graduate fellowships, awarded annually to its members. The foundation also has seven undergraduate awards and two advisor awards.

In 2011, Phi Upsilon Omicron has sixty active college chapters, 31 alumni chapters, and a total membership of approximately 93,065.

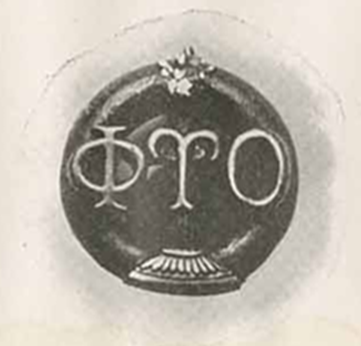
Phi Upsilon Omicron badge

== Symbols ==
The Greek letters Phi Upsilon Omicron represent the first, second, and last words of the Greek phrase that translates as “The Light of the Home.”

The society crest includes a shield with a castle that symbolizes home, a pelican that presents family, and a horn of plants that symbolizes nutrition. Above is a scroll with the Greek letters ΦΥΟ.

Phi Upsilon Omicron's badge features a candle which represents light. Its colors are cream, gold, and purple. Cream symbolized honor and integrity, gold represents light, and violet represents the society's flower. Its flower is the violet.

Its semiannual journal is The Candle. It was first published in November 1915.

== Membership ==
Eligible undergraduate members are majoring and family and consumer sciences and have completed 40 hours with a rank in the top 35 percent of their class. Graduate students in family and consumer science are eligible for membership if they have complete twelve hours with a GPA of 3.2 or higher.

== Governance ==
Phi Upsilon Omicron is overseen by its national council, consisting of a president, president-elect, executive director, alumni councilor, adviser councilor, finance chair, region councilors, the collegiate chair, and collegiate representatives. The national council meets in even-numbered years at a national conclave. Its executive board oversees the society's affairs between the meetings of national council and conclaves. It consists of the national president, national president-elect, alumni councilor, the region councilor chair, the national collegiate chair, and the finance chair, with the executive director serving as an ex-officio member.

Phi Upsilon Omicron's national headquarters is in Bowling Green, Kentucky.

== Chapters ==
Phi Upsilon Omicron has 61 active chapters.

== Notable members ==
- Helen W. Atwater, home economist and editor
- Rajammal P. Devadas, nutritionist and former chancellor of Avinashilingam Institute for Home Science and Higher Education for Women,
- Florence Fallgatter, educator and home economist
- Lois Lampe, botanist and educator
- Abby Marlatt, nutritionist and civil rights activist

== See also ==
- Professional fraternities and sororities
- Honor society
