= Avinashilingam Institute for Home Science & Higher Education for Women =

Women's Deemed University in India

- Motto: Seek and you shall find
- Type: Public
- Established: 1956
- Affiliations: UGC
- Chancellor: Dr. T. S. K. Meenakshisundaram
- Vice-Chancellor: V. Bharathi Harishankar
- Location: Coimbatore, Tamil Nadu, India, India; 11°01′11″N 76°56′58″E
- Campus: Urban
- Website: www.avinuty.ac.in

Avinashilingam Institute for Home Science & Higher Education for Women is a women's Deemed University in Coimbatore, Tamil Nadu, India. It was started in 1957 by the Avinashilingam Education Trust founded by T. S. Avinashilingam Chettiar as Avinashilingam Home Science College for Women which later grow into a university.

== History ==
Avinashilingam University was a part of University of Madras until it was separated in June 1987. It is now the largest institution in the country for imparting home science education.

== Academics ==
Since 1989 the university has offered two majors and two ancillaries for the undergraduate degree courses. The academic year is divided into two semesters, each semester having a minimum of 100 working days.

== Rankings ==
The NIRF (National Institutional Ranking Framework) ranked it 98th among universities in India and 151-200 overall in 2024.

University rankings

General – India
- NIRF (Overall) (2024): 151-200
- NIRF (Universities) (2024): 98

== Faculties ==
The institute has seven schools which comprise the respective domain departments. Each School is functioning under a Dean who is a senior professor. The various schools are:

- School of Physical Sciences and Computational Sciences
- School of Biosciences
- School of Arts and Social Sciences
- School of Home Sciences
- School of Education
- School of Management Studies
- School of Engineering
- School of Allied Health Science
