= Kappa Omicron Nu =

American collegiate honor society

- ΚΟΝ
- Founded: February 21, 1990; 36 years ago (Consolidation): Michigan State University (ΟΝ); Northwest Missouri State University (ΚΟΦ)
- Type: Honor
- Affiliation: ACHS
- Status: Active
- Emphasis: Human Sciences
- Scope: International
- Colors: Maroon and Gold
- Publication: Undergraduate Research Journal for the Human Sciences (URJHS); KON Forum; KON Dialogue
- Chapters: 85 (active)
- Predecessor Groups: Omicron Nu; Kappa Omicron Phi
- Headquarters: PO Box 798; Okemos, Michigan 48805-0798; United States
- Website: www.kon.org

Kappa Omicron Nu (ΚΟΝ) is a college honor society, based in the United States, for students in human sciences. Kappa Omicron Nu chapters are located at colleges and universities that offer a strong human sciences program. Its mission is to promote empowered leaders through excellence in scholarship, leadership, and research in the human sciences. There is also a strong focus on service and contribution to the local community.

As with most college honor societies, most members join as current college students, who are invited after displaying excellence in scholarship. After joining, members remain members for life. Members join local chapters, which communicate with a national office.

KON is a non-profit organization and is accredited by the Association of College Honor Societies (ACHS).

== History ==
Kappa Omicron Nu was established on February 21, 1990, through consolidation of Omicron Nu and Kappa Omicron Phi. Both groups had been members of the Association of College Honor Societies (ACHS). The notion of consolidation came from a strategic planning session for the Administrative leadership of the two organizations. Phi Upsilon Omicron was also invited to join in the discussion of forming one honor society but demurred. Consolidation was eased by an initial period of three years where a single administrative office managed the two groups.

Other suggested names for the consolidated groups were Omicron Society and Sigma Rho Lambda. By the time of the merger, the two groups shared the same publication: Home Economics FORUM, now the ΚΟΝ Forum.

Omicron Nu, Kappa Omicron Phi, and Phi Upsilon Omicron were all honor societies for specialization in home economics. When Omicron Nu and Kappa Omicron Phi consolidated into Kappa Omicron Nu they too began with a focus on home economics. As the home economics profession evolved, in 1994 the American Association of Family and Consumer Sciences (AAFCS) changed the name of the profession from "home economics" to "family and consumer sciences" to better reflect the changing needs in the United States and the current scope of topics related to this field. After this change, Kappa Omicron Nu changed its specialization from "home economics" to "human sciences."

== Eligibility ==
Undergraduate members are required to:

- Have declared a major in one of the human sciences
- Have completed 45 semester hours or equivalent
- Rank in the top 25% of their class in the unit

Graduate members are required to:

- Have declared a major in one of the human sciences
- Have completed 12 semester hours or equivalent
- Have a minimum GPA of 3.5 on a 4.0 scale.

Some professionals are offered membership, usually because of active volunteerism or involvement with the organization, however, the vast majority of members join as college students.

Membership is available to professionals and majors in any of the following or related specialty areas, including consumer resource management, design, exercise science, family and consumer sciences education, financial planning, food science and human nutrition, health sciences, human environment and housing, individual and family development, institution/hotel/restaurant management, interior design, kinesiology, leadership, marital and family therapy, merchandising management, textiles/apparel and clothing.

== Notable members ==
- Joanne G. Emmons (Michigan State), member of both houses of the Michigan Legislature from 1987 until 1999
- Abby Marlatt, social justice activist and professor at the University of Kentucky
- Michael A. O'Donnell, writer, researcher, co-principal investigator of the Adolescent Wellness Research Project

== See also ==
- Professional fraternities and sororities
