= Betty Jo Graber =

American basketball coach (1932–2023)

- Born: Betty Jo Tackitt; March 15, 1932; Oklahoma City, Oklahoma, United States
- Died: January 15, 2023 (aged 90); Weatherford, Texas, United States
- Education: University of North Texas
- Occupation: Women's basketball coach
- Years active: 1954–1991
- Employer: Weatherford College
- Organization: NJCAA

Betty Jo Graber (née Tackitt, formerly Crumm; 15 March 1932 – 15 January 2023) was an American women's basketball coach. She played an instrumental role in the establishment of a women's division of the National Junior College Athletic Association and served as its chair from 1975 until 1991. Graber was a basketball coach at Weatherford College for 35 years, and served as a coach and team manager of the United States team between 1977 and 1984, including their victory at the 1984 Summer Olympics. Graber was admitted to the Women's Basketball Hall of Fame in its inaugural class in 1999.

== Personal life ==
Graber was born on 15 March 1932 in Oklahoma City, Oklahoma to George and Winnie Tackitt; she had two brothers. The family later moved to Panhandle, Texas, where Graber graduated from Panhandle High School. Graber went on to graduate with bachelor's and master's degrees from the University of North Texas, where she was a member of Delta Psi Kappa sorority.

Graber was married to Norris Crumm from 1954 until his death in 1970. She married Raymond Graber in 1980, and became stepmother to his children; he died in 2022. Graber was a practicing Baptist.

Graber died on 15 January 2023 in Weatherford, Texas.

== Coaching career ==
=== College coaching (1954–1991) ===
Graber started her coaching career at Weatherfield High School in 1954. In 1956, she began coaching the women's basketball team at Weatherford College, where she remained for the next 35 years; she also coached for a time at Ranger College.

Graber was one of the pioneers behind the creation of a specific women's division of the NJCAA. This was established in 1975, and Graber acted as NJCAA Region 5 Women's Director, as well as the chair of the women's division's board from 1975 until her retirement in 1991. Graber represented the NJCAA on the Amateur Basketball Association of the United States of America's Women's Games Committee from 1977 to 1988 and on the ABAUSA Council from 1980 until 1984. Graber was the secretary of ABAUSA from 1984 until 1988.

=== National coaching (1977–1984) ===
Graber started working as an assistant coach for the United States women's basketball team in 1977, including the 1977 Junior Select Team and the 1978 National Junior Team. Graber co-coached the national team to victory at the 1979 World Championship and to a silver medal at the 1979 Pan American Games. Graber was the team manager of the United States team that won the gold medal at the 1984 Summer Olympics.

== Recognition ==
In 1974, Graber was named Weatherfield College Faculty Member of the Year; in 1976, she was Texas Junior College Coach of the Year. In 1980, Graber won the National Junior College Coach of the Year.

Upon her retirement in 1991, the NJCAA gave Graber its Services Award; she also was named the Women's Sport Foundation Coaches Award winner.

In 1992, the NJCAA created the Betty Jo Graber Award for Female Student-Athlete of the Year, for student athletes who exhibited Graber's characteristics of "dedication, service and resilience".

Graber was admitted to the Women's Basketball Hall of Fame in 1999 as part of its inaugural class. In 2005, she became a member of the Weatherfield High School Athletic Hall of Fame, where she had first worked as a coach. In 2022, she was admitted to the NJCAA Hall of Fame.

Weatherfield College named its gymnasium the Betty Jo Graber Athletic Centre.
