= List of Delta Psi Kappa chapters =

Delta Psi Kappa was an American collegiate professional fraternity that focused on physical education and recreation. It was founded in 1916 at the Normal College of the North American Gymnastics Union in Indianapolis, Indiana. In the following chapter list, inactive chapters and institutions are in italics.

Chapter	Charter date and range	Institution	Location	Status	Ref.
Alpha	October 23, 1916 – before 1963	Normal College of the North American Gymnastics Union	Indianapolis, Indiana	Inactive	(Note: Chapter formed from a local sorority at the Normal College of the North American Gymnastics Union. the College merged into Indiana University–Purdue University in 1973.)
Beta	1917–192x ?	Stetson University	DeLand, Florida	Inactive	
Gamma	1918–before 1946	University of Oklahoma	Norman, Oklahoma	Inactive	
Delta	1918–before 1946	Posse Normal School of Gymnastics	Boston, Massachusetts	Inactive	
Epsilon	1918	University of Southern California	Los Angeles, California	Inactive	
Zeta	1919–192x ?	Washington University in St. Louis	St. Louis, Missouri	Inactive	
Eta	1919–before 1963	Battle Creek School of Physical Education	Battle Creek, Michigan	Inactive	(Note: Chapter was established at the Normal School of Physical Education, later called the Battle Creek School of Physical Education. The School of Physical Education was open until 1938 as part of the larger university.)
Theta	1919–before 1946	Montclair State College	Montclair, New Jersey	Inactive	(Note: Chapter was formed at Panzer College of Physical Education and Hygiene, later called Montclair State College.)
Iota	1920–before 1946	Oregon State University	Corvallis, Oregon	Inactive	
Kappa	1920–before 1946	American College of Physical Education	Chicago, Illinois	Inactive	(Note: The school merged into DePaul University in 1946.)
Lambda	1920–192x ?	Chicago Normal School of Physical Education	Chicago, Illinois	Inactive	
Mu	June 7, 1920 – before 1946	University of Montana	Missoula, Montana	Inactive	
Nu	1920–192x ?	University of Pittsburgh	Pittsburgh, Pennsylvania	Inactive	
Xi	1926– before 1963	Southern Methodist University	Dallas, Texas	Inactive	
Omicron	1926– before 1963	Brenau College	Gainesville, Georgia	Inactive	
Pi	1927–before 1946	North Dakota State College of Science	Wahpeton, North Dakota	Inactive	
Rho	March 31, 1928	North Texas State Teachers College	Denton, Texas	Inactive	
Sigma	1928–before 1946	George Peabody College	Nashville, Tennessee	Inactive	
Tau	1928	Temple University	Philadelphia, Pennsylvania	Inactive	
Upsilon	1929–before 1946	University of Akron	Akron, Ohio	Inactive	
Phi	1930	University of Wisconsin–La Crosse	La Crosse, Wisconsin	Inactive	(Note: Chapter formed at La Crosse State Teachers College, now University of Wisconsin–La Crosse.)
Chi	1930	Northern Arizona University	Flagstaff, Arizona	Inactive	(Note: Chapter formed at the Arizona State Teachers College at Flagstaff, now called Northern Arizona University.)
Psi	1931–before 1946	Ithaca School of Physical Education	Ithaca, New York	Inactive	
Omega	1932–before 1946	University of Mary Hardin–Baylor	Belton, Texas	Inactive	
Alpha Alpha	1933–before 1946	College of William & Mary	Williamsburg, Virginia	Inactive	
Alpha Beta	October 23, 1938 – before 1963	Minnesota State University Moorhead	Moorhead, Minnesota	Inactive	(Note: Chapter formed at Moorhead State Teachers College, now Minnesota State University Moorhead.)
Alpha Gamma	1939	Louisiana State University	Baton Rouge, Louisiana	Inactive	
Alpha Delta	1945–before 1946	Butler University	Indianapolis, Indiana	Inactive	
Alpha Epsilon	1946	Michigan State University	East Lansing, Michigan	Inactive	
Alpha Zeta	1946	Kansas State College of Pittsburg	Pittsburg, Kansas	Inactive	
Alpha Eta	1947	West Virginia Wesleyan College	Buckhannon, West Virginia	Inactive	
Alpha Theta	1947–before 1963	University of South Carolina	Columbia, South Carolina	Inactive	
Alpha Iota	1948–before 1963	State College of Arkansas	Conway, Arkansas	Inactive	
Alpha Kappa	1948	Southwest Texas State University	San Marcos, Texas	Inactive	
Alpha Lambda	1948	Northern Illinois University	DeKalb, Illinois	Inactive	(Note: Chapter was formed at Northern Illinois State Teachers College, now Northern Illinois University.)
Alpha Mu	1948	Baylor University	Waco, Texas	Inactive	
Alpha Nu	1949	University of North Dakota	Grand Forks, North Dakota	Inactive	
Alpha Omicron	1950	Kent State University	Kent, Ohio	Inactive	
Alpha Pi	1952	Bowling Green State University	Bowling Green, Ohio	Inactive	
Alpha Rho	1952–before 1963	Occidental College	Los Angeles, California	Inactive	
Alpha Sigma	1953	Southwest Missouri State College	Springfield, Missouri	Inactive	
Alpha Tau	1953	Central Michigan University	Mount Pleasant, Michigan	Inactive	(Note: Chapter formed at Central Michigan Normal School, now Central Michigan University.)
Alpha Upsilon	1954	University of Texas at El Paso	El Paso, Texas	Inactive	(Note: Chapter was formed at the Texas Western College of the University of Texas, now the University of Texas at El Paso.)
Alpha Phi	1956	Slippery Rock State College	Slippery Rock, Pennsylvania	Inactive	
Alpha Chi	1958	Lamar University	Beaumont, Texas	Inactive	(Note: Chapter formed at Lamar State College of Technology, now Lamar University.)
Alpha Psi	1959	University of Arizona	Tucson, Arizona	Inactive	
Alpha Omega	1961	University of Kentucky	Lexington, Kentucky	Inactive	
Beta Alpha	1962	Northwest Missouri State College	Maryville, Missouri	Inactive	
Beta Beta	1963	East Texas Baptist College	Marshall, Texas	Inactive	
Beta Gamma	1963	Central Missouri State University	Warrensburg, Missouri	Inactive	
Beta Delta	1964	Trenton State College	Ewing Township, New Jersey	Inactive	
Beta Epsilon ?	June 29, 1963 – 1980	Eastern Michigan University	Ypsilanti, Michigan	Inactive	
Beta Zeta	1965	West Texas State University	Canyon, Texas	Inactive	
Beta Eta	1967	Miami University	Oxford, Ohio	Inactive	
Beta Theta	1967	Central State University	Wilberforce, Ohio	Inactive	
Beta Iota	1968	Texas Tech University	Lubbock, Texas	Inactive	
Beta Kappa	1968	Indiana State University	Terre Haute, Indiana	Inactive	
Beta Lambda	March 1968	Longwood College	Farmville, Virginia	Inactive	(Note: Chapter formed from Turnverein, a local honorary physical education fraternity established in 1967.)
Beta Mu	1968	Grambling State University	Grambling, Louisiana	Inactive	
Beta Nu	1968	University of Southwestern Louisiana	Lafayette, Louisiana	Inactive	
Beta Xi	1969	Eastern Illinois University	Charleston, Illinois	Inactive	
Beta Omicron	1969	University of Wisconsin–River Falls	River Falls, Wisconsin	Inactive	
Beta Pi	1969	Southern Connecticut State College	New Haven, Connecticut	Inactive	
Beta Rho	1970	Western Liberty State College	West Liberty, West Virginia	Inactive	
Beta Sigma	1971–1999	Texas Christian University	Fort Worth, Texas	Inactive	
Beta Tau	1970	University of Miami	Coral Gables, Florida	Inactive	
Beta Upsilon	1970	Florida State University	Tallahassee, Florida	Inactive	
Beta Phi	1970	Georgetown College	Georgetown, Kentucky	Inactive	
Beta Chi	1971	Northwestern State University	Natchitoches, Louisiana	Inactive	
Beta Psi	1972	Indiana University Bloomington	Bloomington, Indiana	Inactive	
Beta Omega	1972	Kansas State University	Manhattan, Kansas	Inactive	
Gamma Alpha	1973	Nicholls State University	Thibodaux, Louisiana	Inactive	
Gamma Beta	1973	Georgia Southern University	Statesboro, Georgia	Inactive	
Gamma Gamma	1973	Eastern Kentucky University	Richmond, Kentucky	Inactive	
Gamma Delta	1973	University of Houston	Houston, Texas	Inactive	
Gamma Epsilon	1975	Old Dominion University	Norfolk, Virginia	Inactive	
Gamma Zeta	1975	Virginia Tech	Blacksburg, Virginia	Inactive	
