= Sylvia Hatchell =

American basketball coach (born 1952)

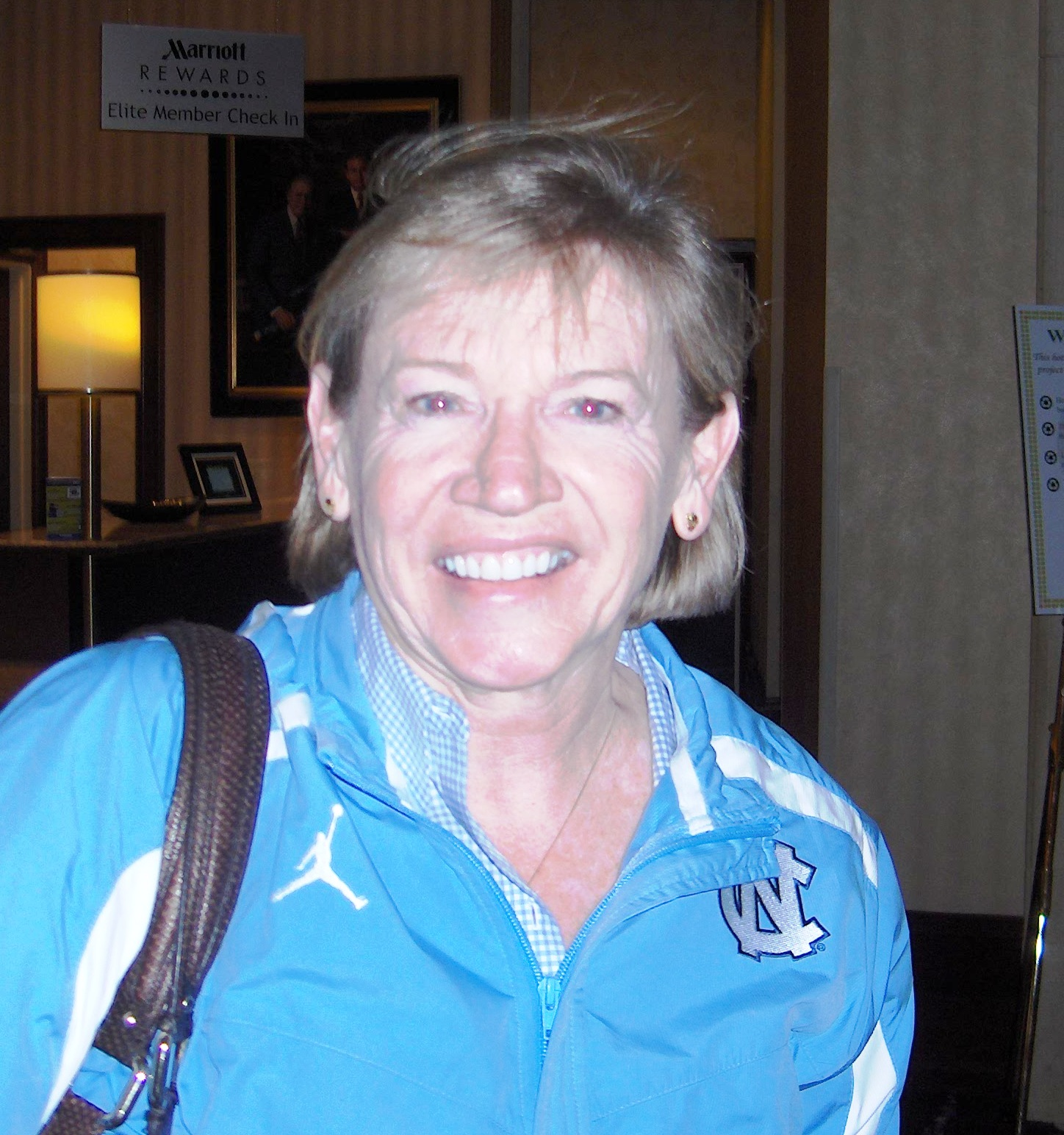
- Hatchell in 2011

Biographical details
- Born: February 28, 1952 (age 74); Gastonia, North Carolina, U.S.
- Education: Carson–Newman; Tennessee

Coaching career (HC unless noted)
- 1974–1975: Tennessee (JV)
- 1975–1986: Francis Marion
- 1988: USA Olympic team (asst.)
- 1986–2019: North Carolina

Head coaching record
- Overall: 1023–405 (.716)

Accomplishments and honors

Championships
- NCAA Division I champion (1994); 3× NCAA Regional – Final Four (1994, 2006, 2007); NAIA champion (1986); AIAW champion (1982); 8× ACC tournament champion (1994, 1995, 1997, 1998, 2005–2008); 4× ACC regular season champion (1997, 2005, 2006, 2008)

Awards
- 2× National Coach of the Year (1994, 2006); 3× ACC Coach of the Year (1997, 2006, 2008)
- Basketball Hall of Fame; Inducted in 2013
- Women's Basketball Hall of Fame
Medal record
Women's basketball
Head Coach for United States
World University Games
Silver medal – second place	1995 Fukuoka	Team competition
William Jones Cup
Gold medal – first place	1994 Taipei	Team competition
Assistant Coach for United States
Olympic Games
Gold medal – first place	1988 Seoul	Team competition
FIBA World Championship for Women
Gold medal – first place	1986 Moscow	Team competition
Goodwill Games
Gold medal – first place	1986 Moscow	Team competition
World University Games
Silver medal – second place	1985 Kobe	Team competition
Gold medal – first place	1983 Edmonton	Team competition

Sylvia Rhyne Hatchell (born February 28, 1952) is a former American women's basketball coach, who last coached for the University of North Carolina at Chapel Hill (UNC) and was the fifth with the most career wins in NCAA women's basketball history, behind former Tennessee coach Pat Summitt, Stanford coach Tara VanDerveer, and UConn coach Geno Auriemma. She competed with USA Basketball as the head coach of the 1994 Jones Cup Team that won the gold in Taipei. Hatchell was inducted into the Women's Basketball Hall of Fame in 2004.

On April 2, 2019, Hatchell and three assistants were placed on administrative leave following accusations of racially insensitive remarks and forcing players to play while injured. She resigned as North Carolina's head coach on April 18, 2019.

== College ==
Hatchell graduated from Carson–Newman College with a BS degree in physical education in 1974. She completed her master's degree the following year at the University of Tennessee.

== Coaching ==
Hatchell realized that coaching was her calling when she was asked to coach a junior high girls' basketball team in 1974. She followed that with a brief stint as the junior varsity basketball coach at the University of Tennessee, then moved on to become the coach at Francis Marion College, where she would remain for the next eleven years, compiling a 272–80 record.

In 1986, Hatchell would take the head coaching position at the University of North Carolina. Under Hatchell's leadership the Tar Heels would become one of the nation's top basketball teams and also become a mainstay in the NCAA tournament.

The highlight of Hatchell's career was winning the national championship in 1994. The title game against Louisiana Tech was one of the more exciting finishes in tournament history. Louisiana Tech had scored with 14 seconds to go in the game, giving them a two-point lead, 59–57. UNC's Tonya Sampson attempted a shot with four seconds to go in the game that would tie the game, but it did not go in. The Tar Heels rebounded the ball and called a time out, with only 0.7 seconds left in the game. Stephanie Lawrence passed the ball inbounds to Charlotte Smith, who hit a 20-foot jump shot for three points to win the game and the national championship at the buzzer.

In 2009, Hatchell became only the fourth coach of a women's basketball team to reach the 800-win plateau. The win came against in-state rival North Carolina State, and was tough, as the Tar Heels needed overtime to pull out the win. UNC faced the same opponent for Hatchell's 700th victory, on January 16, 2006.

In 2013, Hatchell was forced to step aside from her coaching duties when she was diagnosed with acute myeloid leukemia in October. A routine physical in September showed a low white blood cell count, which eventually led to the diagnosis. This was the first time she has missed any games coaching since January 1989, when she was out for the birth of her son. She was treated with aggressive chemotherapy at UNC's Lineberger Comprehensive Cancer Center. She was able to resume coaching at the start of the 2014–15 season.

UNC extended Hatchell's contract through the 2019–20 season on September 22, 2016. The contract was originally set to expire in 2018.

On December 19, 2017, Hatchell became the third coach in women's basketball history to record 1,000 career wins, when the Tar Heels defeated Grambling State.

Hatchell's son, Van, graduated from UNC in 2011 and was a walk-on senior on the 2010–11 men's basketball team.

On April 18, 2019, Sylvia Hatchell resigned as head coach of UNC women's basketball.

== Head coaching record ==
Source for Francis Marion:

Record table
Season	Team	Overall	Conference	Standing	Postseason
Francis Marion Patriots (South Carolina AIAW) (1975–1982)
1975–76	Francis Marion	23–9			AIAW Small College
1976–77	Francis Marion	21–11			AIAW Small College
1977–78	Francis Marion	22–11			AIAW Small College
1978–79	Francis Marion	19–11			AIAW Small College
1979–80	Francis Marion	20–8			
1980–81	Francis Marion	27–5			AIAW Small College
1981–82	Francis Marion	27–7			AIAW Division II champions
Francis Marion Patriots (NAIA District Six) (1982–1986)
1982–83	Francis Marion	23–7			NAIA Area 7 second round
1983–84	Francis Marion	28–5			NAIA quarterfinals
1984–85	Francis Marion	26–4			NAIA quarterfinals
1985–86	Francis Marion	36–2			NAIA champions
Francis Marion:		272–80 (.773)			
North Carolina Tar Heels (Atlantic Coast Conference) (1986–2019)
1986–87	North Carolina	19–10	9–5	3rd	NCAA second round
1987–88	North Carolina	10–17	4–10	6th	
1988–89	North Carolina	10–20	1–13	8th	
1989–90	North Carolina	13–15	3–11	8th	
1990-91	North Carolina	12–16	2–12	8th	
1991–92	North Carolina	22–9	9–7	T–3rd	NCAA second round
1992–93	North Carolina	23–7	11-5	T–2nd	NCAA Sweet 16
1993–94	North Carolina	33–2	14–2	2nd	NCAA Champions
1994–95	North Carolina	30–5	12–4	2nd	NCAA Sweet 16
1995–96	North Carolina	13–14	8–8	5th	
1996–97	North Carolina	29–3	13–1	1st	NCAA Sweet 16
1997–98	North Carolina	27–7	11–5	4th	NCAA Elite Eight
1998–99	North Carolina	28–8	11–5	T–3rd	NCAA Sweet 16
1999–00	North Carolina	20–13	8–8	5th	NCAA Sweet 16
2000–01	North Carolina	15–14	7–9	7th	
2001–02	North Carolina	26–9	11–5	2nd	NCAA Sweet 16
2002–03	North Carolina	28–6	13–3	2nd	NCAA second round
2003–04	North Carolina	24–7	12–4	2nd	NCAA first round
2004–05	North Carolina	30–4	12–2	1st	NCAA Elite Eight
2005–06	North Carolina	33–2	13–1	1st	NCAA Final Four
2006–07	North Carolina	34–4	11–3	2nd	NCAA Final Four
2007–08	North Carolina	33–3	14–0	1st	NCAA Elite Eight
2008–09	North Carolina	28–7	12–4	4th	NCAA second round
2009–10	North Carolina	19–12	6–8	T–7th	NCAA first round
2010–11	North Carolina	28–9	8–6	6th	NCAA Sweet 16
2011–12	North Carolina	20–11	9–7	T–6th	
2012–13	North Carolina	29–7	14–4	T–2nd	NCAA second round
2013–14	North Carolina	27–10	10-6	T–5th	NCAA Elite Eight
2014–15	North Carolina	26–9	10–6	6th	NCAA Sweet 16
2015–16	North Carolina	14–18	4–12	12th	
2016–17	North Carolina	15–16	3–13	T–13th	
2017–18	North Carolina	15–16	4–12	12th	
2018–19	North Carolina	18–15	8–8	8th	NCAA first round
North Carolina:		751–325 (.698)	297–209 (.587)		
Total:		1023–405 (.716)			
National champion Postseason invitational champion Conference regular season champion Conference regular season and conference tournament champion Division regular season champion Division regular season and conference tournament champion Conference tournament champion

== USA Basketball ==
Hatchell was the assistant coach of the team representing the USA at the World University Games held in Edmonton, Canada in July 1983. The first game against Hong Kong was a mismatch—the USA team would outscore their opponents by triple digits, 134–23. Joyce Walker's 26 points alone were more than the entire Hong Kong team. The next two games against France and West Germany were closer, but the USA still won by 16 and 15 points respectively. The USA team faced Romania and lost by 14 points 85–71. The next opponent was Yugoslavia, which the USA needed to win to stay in medal contention. The game was close, but the USA won by a single point 86–85 to head to a rematch with Romania for the gold medal. The Romanian team started out strong, and held a six-point lead at halftime. The USA team came back, out scoring their opponents 47–19 in the second half, and won the game, earning the gold medal. Walker was the leading scorer for the US with 13.8 points per game, but Deborah Temple Lee was close behind with 13.5 points per game.

Hatchell was the assistant coach of the team representing the US at the World University Games held in Kobe, Japan in July 1985. The team won their three preliminary games with ease, beating the People's Republic of Korea, Yugoslavia and Great Britain by more than 25 points each. Their next game, against China, was much closer, but the USA team had balanced scoring, with five players in double figures for points, and won 83–78. The USA team played Canada in the semifinal, and again had five players with double-digit scoring, winning 85–61 to advance to the gold medal game against the USSR. The USA fell behind by as much as 18 points in the second half. They attempted a comeback, and cut the margin, but the USSR hit almost 55% of their shots and went on to claim the gold medal 87–81. The USA received the silver medal. Katrina McClain was the leading scorer and rebounder for the USA team with 17.3 points and 7.7 rebounds per game.

Hatchell was named assistant coach of the USA national team which would compete at the 1986 World Championships and the 1990 Olympics. The World Championships were held in Moscow, Soviet Union in August. The USA team started strong with a more than 50-point victory over Taipei. The USA team continued to dominate their opponents, winning the next three preliminary rounds games, with a 15-point victory over Hungary being the closest margin, then advanced to the medal play rounds. They defeated China in the quarterfinals, and Canada in the semifinals to set up the championship match against host and undefeated Soviet Union. Although the USA had recently defeated the USSR in the Goodwill Games, the USA wanted to demonstrate that the victory was no "fluke". The Soviet team was taller, but the USA team was able to outscore them. The USA team started the game with the first eight points, and had a 15–1 run during the second half, and won in convincing fashion 108–88 to win the gold medal and the world championship. Every one of the starters achieved double-digit scoring in the final game, led by Cheryl Miller who had 24 points along with 15 rebounds in the championship game.

In 1994, Hatchell served as the head coach of the 1994 R. William Jones Cup Team for the competition held in Taipei, Taiwan. Despite having four players averaging double-digit scoring, including Wendy Palmer at almost 19 points per game, the USA had some close matches. After winning the opening game, the USA team faced the champions of the prior year, Republic of China – Cathay Life. The game came down to the final seconds, resulting in an 82–81 win. Palmer had 31 points, all needed. In the game against Kazakhstan, the USA was behind by two points at halftime, but came back to win. The USA repeated the feat against Canada, falling behind two points at halftime, but finishing with a win. The USA next faced unbeaten South Korea and came away with a win. Despite not losing a game, the USA needed to beat Republic of China – Nan Ya to advance to the gold medal game, and succeeded, with a 72–64 win. In the final game against South Korea, the teams were tied at the end of regulation and went into overtime. The USA was down with just over a minute to go when Palmer hit a basket to give the USA a one-point lead. After two free throws, South Korea scored, and had the ball on the final possession with a chance to win, but was unable to get up a shot in time. The USA won the gold medal with an 8–0 performance, but with many close games.

In 1995 Hatchell was the head coach, with assistants Jim Lewis, Kay James, and Clemette Haskins, of the team representing the US at the World University Games held in Fukuoka, Japan in August and September. The USA team won their first five games with ease, with only the 18-point victory over Yugoslavia in a quarterfinal match falling short of a 20-point margin of victory. In the semifinal against Russia, the team was behind for much of the first half and held only a two-point lead with under ten minutes to go, but then went on a 25–4 run to take control of the game. The final game, for the gold medal, was against Italy. The Italians started with a 12–2 run to open the game. The USA cut the lead, but were behind by nine points at the half. The USA took a lead in the second half, but the Italians responded with ten consecutive points and then held on to win the gold medal, leaving the US with the silver.

She continued on as assistant coach at the 1988 Olympics in Seoul, Korea, where the USA team also won the gold medal.

Hatchell also served as the head coach for the USA team at the 1995 World University Games in Fukuoka, Japan, where the team won the silver medal.

== Personal ==
On January 10, 2020, Hatchell was cited for misdemeanor death by vehicle in connection to an incident on January 6 in which an 89-year-old pedestrian was struck down by Hatchell in a parking lot, and who died two days later.

== Author ==
Hatchell is the co-author of two books on coaching basketball:

- Hatchell, Sylvia; Thomas, Jeff (November 15, 2005). The Baffled Parent's Guide to Coaching Girls' Basketball. International Marine/Ragged Mountain Press. ISBN 978-0-07-145923-5.
- Hatchell, Sylvia; Thomas, Jeff (June 22, 2006). The Complete Guide to Coaching Girls' Basketball: Building a Great Team the Carolina Way. International Marine/Ragged Mountain Press. ISBN 978-0-07-147394-1.

== Awards and honors ==
- 1986 Russell Athletic/WBCA National Coach of the Year
- 1993 Francis Marion University Athletic Hall of Fame
- 1994 USA Today National Coach of the Year
- 1994 College Sports Magazine National Coach of the Year
- 2004 Elected to the Women's Basketball Hall of Fame, located in Knoxville, Tennessee
- 2006 US Basketball Writers Association (USBWA) Coach of the Year award.
- 2006 Russell Athletic/WBCA National Coach of the Year
- 2006 Naismith College Coach of the Year
- 2006 AP Coach of the Year
- 2013 Elected to Naismith Memorial Basketball Hall of Fame

== See also ==
- List of college women's basketball career coaching wins leaders
