= Jefferson Methodist Church =

Historic church in Oregon, United States

- U.S. National Register of Historic Places
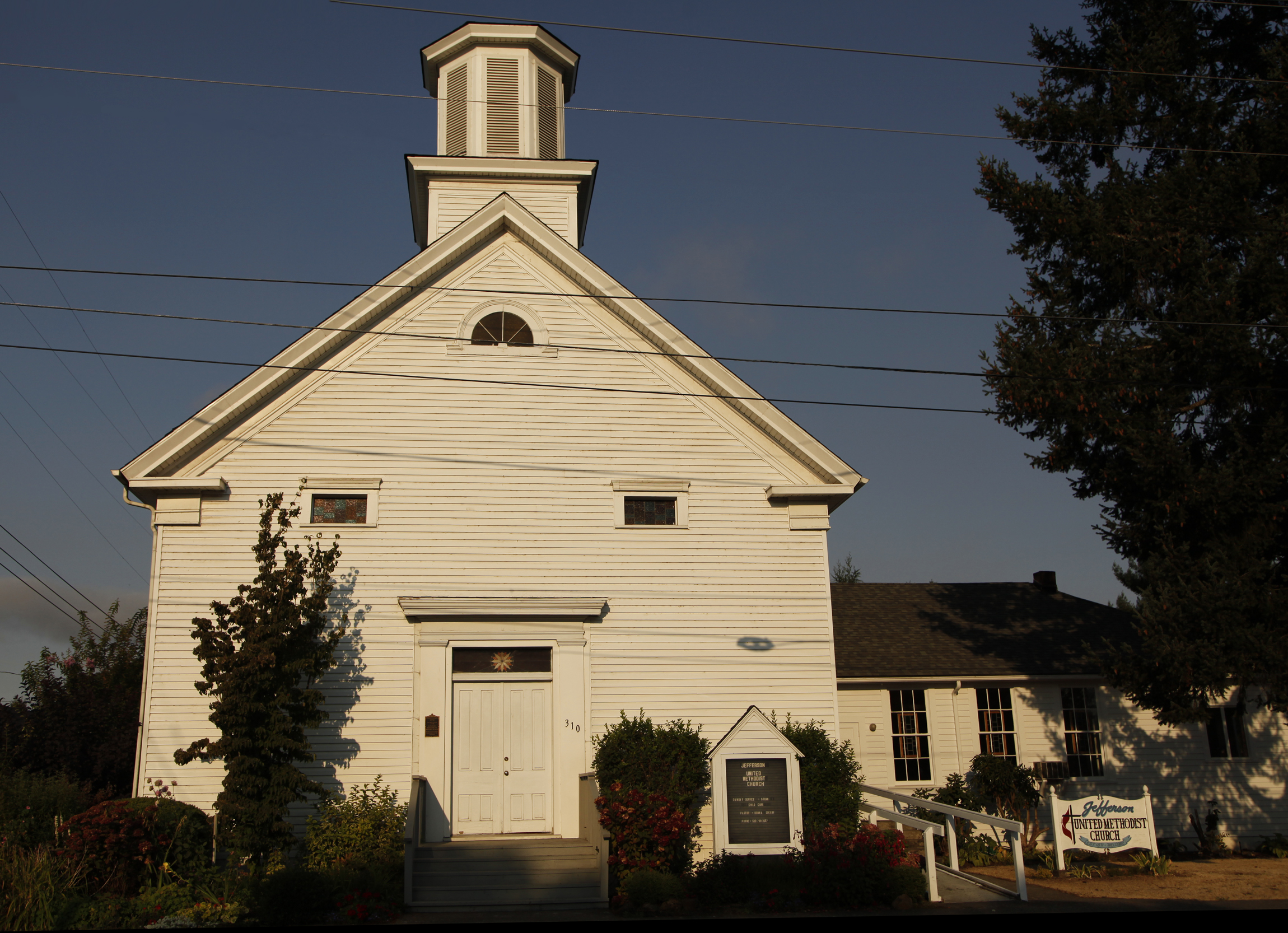
- The Jefferson Methodist Church in 2012
- Location: 310 and 342 N. 2nd Street; Jefferson, Oregon
- Coordinates: 44°43′12″N 123°00′38″W
- Area: 0.52 acres (0.21 ha)
- Built: 1871
- Architectural style: Classical Revival
- NRHP reference No.: 80003346
- Added to NRHP: November 6, 1980

The Jefferson United Methodist Church is a church and historic church building located in Jefferson, Oregon, United States.

The church building was listed on the National Register of Historic Places in 1980.

== See also ==
- National Register of Historic Places listings in Marion County, Oregon
