= Phi Delta Pi =

American women's fraternity for health professions

- ΦΔΠ
- Founded: October 23, 1916; 109 years ago Normal College of the American Gymnastics Union
- Type: Professional
- Former affiliation: PPA
- Status: Merged
- Merge date: March 1970
- Successor: Delta Psi Kappa
- Emphasis: Physical Education
- Scope: National
- Colors: Purple and Gold
- Symbol: Oak leaf
- Flower: Purple violet
- Jewel: Amethyst
- Chapters: 19
- Members: 5,000 (1967) lifetime
- Headquarters: United States

Phi Delta Pi (ΦΔΠ) was a national professional fraternity for women in the disciplines of health and physical education, health sciences, and recreation. It was established in 1916 at the Normal College of the North American Gymnastics Union (now Indiana University School of Health and Human Sciences). It merged with Delta Psi Kappa, a professional fraternity, in March 1970.

== History ==
Phi Delta Pi was founded on October 23, 1916 at the Normal College of the North American Gymnastics Union in Indianapolis, Indiana. It was a national professional fraternity for women in the disciplines of health and physical education, health sciences, and recreation.

Phi Delta Pi was one of the eleven women's professional fraternities to found the Professional Panhellenic Association in 1925.

Many of its early chapters were placed at vocational-oriented Normal Schools for Physical Education which did not survive the Great Depression. Later chapters were placed at colleges with broader course offerings and stronger financial footing. Baird's reports there were fourteen active chapters and sixteen inactive chapters in 1967, but provides only twenty chapter names in the 20th Edition of that resource.

Phi Delta Pi merged with Delta Psi Kappa, a professional fraternity, in March 1970.

== Symbols ==
The colors of Phi Delta Pi were purple and gold. Its symbol was the oak leaf. Its flower was the purple violet. Its jewel was the amethyst.

== Membership ==
Four types of membership existed in Phi Delta Pi: active, alumnae, honorary, and special membership.

== Chapters ==
The chapters of Phi Delta Pi were as follows; this list may be incomplete, and some chapters here listed as inactive may have merged or been absorbed only as alumni clubs (no active chapters). Inactive chapters and institutions are indicated in italics.

Chapter	Charter date and range	Institution	Location	Status	Ref.
Alpha	October 23, 1916 – 1942	Normal College of the North American Gymnastics Union	Indianapolis, IN	Inactive	
Beta	1918 – March 1970	Temple University	Philadelphia, PA	Merged (ΔΨΚ)	(Note: Chapter joined the existing Tau chapter of Delta Psi Kappa at the time of the merger of the two groups.)
Gamma	1918–1919	Northwestern University	Evanston, IL	Inactive	
Delta	1919–1965	American College of Physical Education (now De Paul)	Chicago, IL	Inactive	
Epsilon	1918–March 1970	Kellogg School of Physical Education	Battle Creek, MI	Merged (ΔΨΚ)	(Note: The Physical Education school at what was then known as Battle Creek College, was open until 1938 as a department of what became Andrews University.) (Note: Chapter joined or became the Eta chapter of Delta Psi Kappa at the time of the merger to the two groups.)
Zeta	1919–1921	Chicago Normal School of Physical Education	Chicago, IL	Inactive	(Note: This school was also the site of the Lambda chapter of ΔΨΚ (1920).)
Eta	1920–19xx ?	University of Utah	Salt Lake City, UT	Inactive	
Theta	1922–19xx ?	Ithaca School of Physical Education	Ithaca, NY	Merged (ΔΨΚ)	(Note: This school was also the site of Psi chapter (1931-19xx) of ΔΨΚ.)
Iota	1924–1944	Savage School of Physical Education	New York, NY	Inactive	(Note: This school was also the site of the Lambda chapter of ΔΨΚ (1920).)
Kappa	1927–1944	Panzer College of Physical Education	East Orange, NJ	Inactive	(Note: This school (Panzer) was also the site of the Theta chapter of ΔΨΚ (1919). Panzer merged with nearby Montclair State College in 1958.)
Lambda	1928–1936	Ohio University	Athens, OH	Inactive	
Mu	1929–19xx	Utah State University	Logan, UT	Inactive	
Nu	1930–1942	Southeastern Teachers College	Durant, OK	Inactive	
Xi	1931–19xx	Brigham Young University	Provo, UT	Inactive	
Omicron	1933–1943	University of California, Santa Barbara	Santa Barbara, CA	Inactive	
Pi	1935–1954	Slippery Rock University	Slippery Rock, PA	Inactive	(Note: A separate Alpha Phi chapter of ΔΨΚ was established on the Slippery Rock campus in 1956)
Rho	1949–1965	Wittenberg University	Springfield, OH	Inactive	
Sigma	1951–19xx	University of Minnesota Duluth	Duluth, MN	Inactive	
Tau	1952–1970	University of Miami	Coral Gables, FL	Merged (ΔΨΚ)	(Note: Appears to have become the Beta Tau chapter of ΔΨΚ.)
Upsilon	1959–1970	Florida State University	Tallahassee, FL	Merged (ΔΨΚ)	(Note: Appears to have become the Beta Upsilon chapter of ΔΨΚ.)

== Notable members ==
- Maud May Babcock (honorary), pioneer leader in physical education in Salt Lake City, Utah
- Jane Deeter Rippin (honorary), past National Director of the Girl Scouts of the United States of America

== See also ==
- Professional fraternities and sororities
