= Jefferson, Oregon =

- City
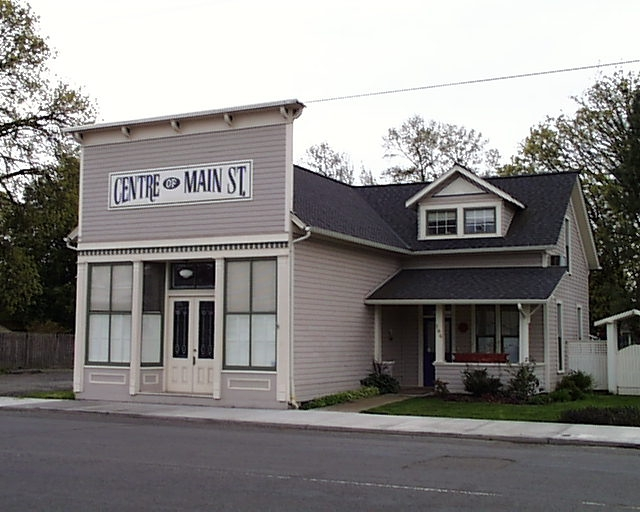
- Oliver's House in Jefferson

- Location in Oregon
- Coordinates: 44°43′03″N 123°00′10″W
- Country: United States
- State: Oregon
- County: Marion
- Incorporated: 1870

Government
  - Mayor: David Watkins

Area
  - Total: 0.88 sq mi (2.29 km^{2})
  - Land: 0.86 sq mi (2.22 km^{2})
  - Water: 0.027 sq mi (0.07 km^{2})
- Elevation: 240 ft (73 m)

Population (2020)
  - Total: 3,327
  - Density: 3,883.5/sq mi (1,499.43/km^{2})
- Time zone: UTC-8 (Pacific)
  - Summer (DST): UTC-7 (Pacific)
- ZIP code: 97352
- Area code: 541
- FIPS code: 41-37250
- GNIS feature ID: 2410137
- Website: www.jeffersonoregon.org

Jefferson is a city in Marion County, Oregon, United States. It is part of the Salem Metropolitan Statistical Area. The population was 3,327 at the 2020 census. The city sits on the east (right) bank of the Santiam River between Salem and Albany along Oregon Route 164 east of Interstate 5.

== History ==
The first name for this locality was Conser's Ferry, for Jacob S. Conser, an Oregon Trail pioneer of 1848 who ran a ferry across the Santiam River. Conser was also involved in the communities of Syracuse and Santiam City, which were about 2 miles (3 km) downstream of Jefferson. He established the ferry in 1851, and also served as the postmaster of Santiam City. When the Jefferson Institute was established in the vicinity (not the same as the Jefferson Institute in Polk County), the name Jefferson was eventually adopted by the community. Jefferson post office was established in 1861, with a name change from Syracuse, and previously, Santiam City.

In 1974, the Jacob Conser House was listed on the National Register of Historic Places (NRHP), which served as the city's library until 2018. The current Oregon Route 164 bridge across the Santiam was designed by Conde McCullough and named in Conser's honor. The Jefferson Methodist Church was added to the NRHP in 1980. In 2017, voters recalled mayor Cyndie Hightower, and three city council members resigned over issues related to the annexation of land into the city.

== Geography ==
Jefferson is in southwestern Marion County, with the Santiam River forming its western border, which also serves as the border with Linn County. It is 2.5 miles (4.0 km) east of Interstate 5, 9 miles (14 km) north of Albany, and 16 miles (26 km) south of Salem, the state capital.

According to the U.S. Census Bureau, the city of Jefferson has a total area of 0.89 square miles (2.31 km^{2}), of which 0.03 square miles (0.08 km^{2}), or 3.16%, are water. The Santiam River flows northwest from Jefferson to join the Willamette River near Buena Vista.

=== Climate ===
This region experiences warm (but not hot) and dry summers, with no average monthly temperatures above 71.6 °F (22.0 °C). According to the Köppen Climate Classification system, Jefferson has a warm-summer Mediterranean climate, abbreviated "Csb" on climate maps.

== Demographics ==
Historical population
| Census | Pop. | Note | %± |
|---|---|---|---|
| 1890 | 307 | | — |
| 1900 | 273 | | −11.1% |
| 1910 | 415 | | 52.0% |
| 1920 | 417 | | 0.5% |
| 1930 | 391 | | −6.2% |
| 1940 | 479 | | 22.5% |
| 1950 | 636 | | 32.8% |
| 1960 | 716 | | 12.6% |
| 1970 | 936 | | 30.7% |
| 1980 | 1,702 | | 81.8% |
| 1990 | 1,805 | | 6.1% |
| 2000 | 2,487 | | 37.8% |
| 2010 | 3,098 | | 24.6% |
| 2020 | 3,327 | | 7.4% |
U.S. Decennial Census

=== 2020 census ===
As of the 2020 census, Jefferson had a population of 3,327. The median age was 35.4 years. 27.3% of residents were under the age of 18 and 14.4% of residents were 65 years of age or older. For every 100 females there were 89.5 males, and for every 100 females age 18 and over there were 90.5 males age 18 and over.

0% of residents lived in urban areas, while 100.0% lived in rural areas.

There were 1,133 households in Jefferson, of which 41.1% had children under the age of 18 living in them. Of all households, 56.9% were married-couple households, 13.2% were households with a male householder and no spouse or partner present, and 23.1% were households with a female householder and no spouse or partner present. About 16.0% of all households were made up of individuals and 6.1% had someone living alone who was 65 years of age or older.

There were 1,166 housing units, of which 2.8% were vacant. Among occupied housing units, 77.2% were owner-occupied and 22.8% were renter-occupied. The homeowner vacancy rate was 0.7% and the rental vacancy rate was 3.0%.

Racial composition as of the 2020 census
| Race | Number | Percent |
|---|---|---|
| White | 2,622 | 78.8% |
| Black or African American | 14 | 0.4% |
| American Indian and Alaska Native | 58 | 1.7% |
| Asian | 20 | 0.6% |
| Native Hawaiian and Other Pacific Islander | 11 | 0.3% |
| Some other race | 211 | 6.3% |
| Two or more races | 391 | 11.8% |
| Hispanic or Latino (of any race) | 544 | 16.4% |

=== 2010 census ===
As of the census of 2010, there were 3,098 people, 1,057 households, and 820 families living in the city. The population density was 4,076.3 inhabitants per square mile (1,573.9/km^{2}). There were 1,119 housing units at an average density of 1,472.4 per square mile (568.5/km^{2}). The racial makeup of the city was 83.8% White, 0.2% African American, 1.7% Native American, 0.5% Asian, 0.3% Pacific Islander, 9.6% from other races, and 3.9% from two or more races. Hispanic or Latino of any race were 19.2% of the population.

There were 1,057 households, of which 44.3% had children under the age of 18 living with them, 59.5% were married couples living together, 13.3% had a female householder with no husband present, 4.7% had a male householder with no wife present, and 22.4% were non-families. 16.0% of all households were made up of individuals, and 6.7% had someone living alone who was 65 years of age or older. The average household size was 2.93 and the average family size was 3.27.

The median age in the city was 32 years. 30.5% of residents were under the age of 18; 8.1% were between the ages of 18 and 24; 29.3% were from 25 to 44; 22.8% were from 45 to 64; and 9.4% were 65 years of age or older. The gender makeup of the city was 48.7% male and 51.3% female.

=== 2000 census ===
As of the census of 2000, there were 2,487 people, 817 households, and 643 families living in the city. The population density was 3,389.3 inhabitants per square mile (1,308.6/km^{2}). There were 885 housing units at an average density of 1,206.1 per square mile (465.7/km^{2}). The racial makeup of the city was 81.83% White, 0.36% African American, 1.89% Native American, 0.76% Asian, 0.04% Pacific Islander, 11.66% from other races, and 3.46% from two or more races. Hispanic or Latino of any race were 20.67% of the population.

There were 817 households, out of which 48.1% had children under the age of 18 living with them, 58.6% were married couples living together, 15.1% had a female householder with no husband present, and 21.2% were non-families. 16.4% of all households were made up of individuals, and 5.9% had someone living alone who was 65 years of age or older. The average household size was 3.04 and the average family size was 3.34.

In the city, the population was spread out, with 34.2% under the age of 18, 8.4% from 18 to 24, 30.4% from 25 to 44, 19.8% from 45 to 64, and 7.2% who were 65 years of age or older. The median age was 30 years. For every 100 females, there were 99.0 males. For every 100 females age 18 and over, there were 97.7 males.

The median income for a household in the city was $40,938, and the median income for a family was $42,647. Males had a median income of $31,196 versus $25,417 for females. The per capita income for the city was $15,426. About 12.2% of families and 16.2% of the population were below the poverty line, including 19.6% of those under age 18 and 4.2% of those age 65 or over.

== Government ==
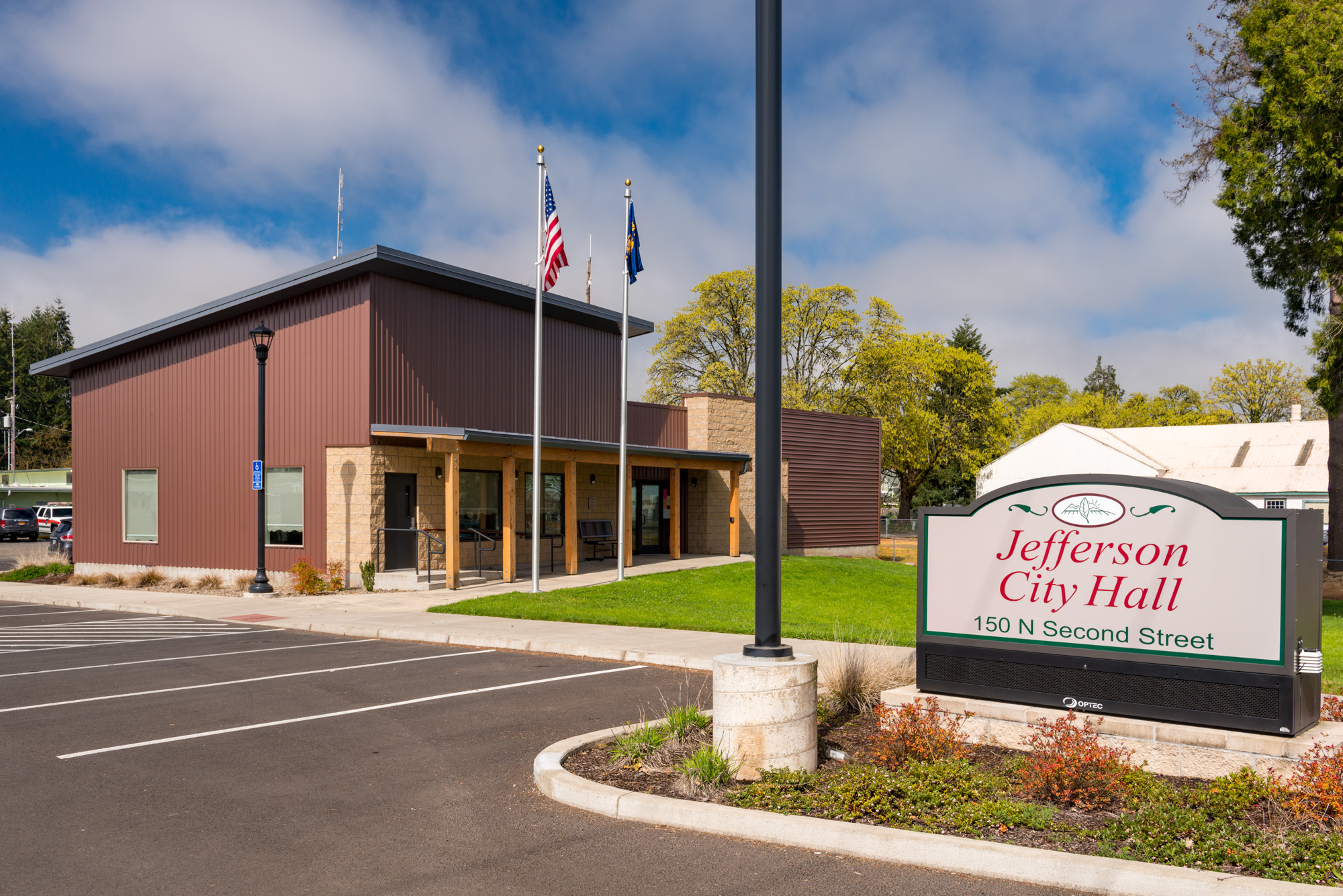
Jefferson City Hall

Jefferson uses a city council composed of six councilors and the mayor. As of January 2025, the current mayor of Jefferson is David Watkins.

== Education ==
Public education in the city is provided by the Jefferson School District, which includes three schools: Jefferson Elementary School, Jefferson Middle School, and Jefferson High School.

A new middle school was built in 2019. The school is located right beside the Jefferson High School.

== Notable people ==
- Jeff Gilmour, politician
- Carol Menken-Schaudt, Olympic basketball player
- Frederick Steiwer, politician
