= 1984 United States women's Olympic basketball team =

- Head coach: Pat Summitt

The 1984 United States women's Olympic basketball team competed in the Games of the XXIII Olympiad, representing the United States of America. The U.S. women's Olympic team won their first gold medal at the event having previously finished runner-up in the 1976 Olympics and not having competed in the 1980 Olympics due to the Olympic boycott.

== Roster ==
United States women's national basketball team – 1984 Summer Olympics roster
Players
Coaches

Pos.	No.	Name	Age – Date of birth	Height	Club	Ctr.
G		Cathy Boswell	21 – November 10, 1962	1.75 m (5 ft 9 in)	U.S. national team	(United States)
F		Denise Curry	24 – August 22, 1959	1.85 m (6 ft 1 in)	U.S. national team	(United States)
C		Anne Donovan	22 – November 1, 1961	2.03 m (6 ft 8 in)	Old Dominion	(United States)
SG		Teresa Edwards	20 – July 19, 1964	1.80 m (5 ft 11 in)	Georgia	(United States)
G		Lea Henry	22 – November 22, 1961	1.63 m (5 ft 4 in)	Tennessee	(United States)
F		Janice Lawrence	22 – June 7, 1962	1.89 m (6 ft 2 in)	Louisiana Tech	(United States)
PF		Pamela McGee	21 – December 1, 1962	1.91 m (6 ft 3 in)	USC	(United States)
C		Carol Menken-Schaudt	26 – November 23, 1957	1.94 m (6 ft 4 in)	U.S. national team	(United States)
SF		Cheryl Miller	20 – January 3, 1964	1.88 m (6 ft 2 in)	USC	(United States)
PG		Kim Mulkey	22 – May 17, 1962	1.63 m (5 ft 4 in)	Louisiana Tech	(United States)
C		Cindy Noble	25 – November 14, 1958	1.93 m (6 ft 4 in)	U.S. national team	(United States)
SG		Lynette Woodard	24 – August 12, 1959	1.83 m (6 ft 0 in)	U.S. national team	(United States)

Head coach

(United States) Pat Summitt

Legend

- Club – describes last
  club before the tournament
- Age – describes age
  on July 29, 1984
- Source –

== Results ==
=== Group stage ===
July 30

Yugoslavia	55–83	United States
Scoring by half: 29–43, 26–40

The Forum, Inglewood, California

July 31

Australia	47–81	United States
Scoring by half: 28–51, 19–30

The Forum, Inglewood, California

August 2

United States	84–47	South Korea
Scoring by half: 40–20, 44–27

The Forum, Inglewood, California

=== Semifinal ===
August 3

China	55–91	United States
Scoring by half: 26–38, 29–53

The Forum, Inglewood, California

=== Gold Medal Final ===
August 5

Canada	61–92	United States
Scoring by half: 31–41, 30–51

The Forum, Inglewood, California

== See also ==
- 1984 Summer Olympics
- Basketball at the 1984 Summer Olympics
- United States at the 1984 Summer Olympics
- United States women's national basketball team
