= Jill Hutchison =

American basketball coach (born 1945)

Biographical details
- Born: March 8, 1945 (age 81)

Playing career
- 1964–1967: New Mexico

Coaching career (HC unless noted)
- 1971–1999: Illinois State

Head coaching record
- Overall: 428–304 (.585)
- Tournaments: NCAA 1–3 (.250)

Accomplishments and honors

Awards
- 3× MVC Coach of the Year Award (1985, 1988, 1996); Carol Eckman Award (1992)
- Women's Basketball Hall of Fame
Medal record
Women's basketball
Head Coach for United States
World University Games
Gold medal – first place	1983 Edmonton	Team competition

Jill Hutchison (born March 8, 1945) is an American retired women's basketball coach, having served as head coach for 28 seasons at Illinois State. Hutchison also served as the first president of the Women's Basketball Coaches Association. She was active in USA Basketball, serving as the head coach of the gold medal-winning team representing the US at the World University Games in 1983. Hutchison was inducted into the Women's Basketball Hall of Fame in 2009.

== Early years ==
Although the University of New Mexico (UNM) had a women's basketball team as early as 1898, formal intercollegiate play did not start until the 1974–75 season. Hutchison attended New Mexico, graduating in 1967, and played basketball for intramural teams during her time at the school. Occasionally, the teams would play at "sports days" at area schools in Arizona and Utah.

== Illinois State ==
After graduating from UNM, Hutchison was admitted to the master's program at Illinois State University. Her master's thesis involved study of female basketball players to determine whether their hearts could play a full court game. Her research concluded that they could. After she finished her master’s program she became the women’s basketball coach at Illinois state university, from 1970–73, 1974-99.

Some examples of her professional achievements include coaching the women's intercollegiate basketball team, leading them to win second place in the state tournament of 1971. She was also a coach to the Women’s Intercollegiate Softball team in 1972. She led the Women cager team t to a victory in 1975 against Northern Illinois state university with 18 points within 40 minutes. Led her team to win in state competition in AIAW, and won against Illinois southern state university. She was recognized as the reason for the ISU women’s basketball team’s success in the NCAA in the Vidette in 1992. Aside from being a couch, she was also a speaker who was the guest speaker ISU Women’s Recreation association and intercollegiate sports for women in 1970. Although a year later the women and men athletic department were combined and the women’s athletic director position was eliminated she continued to be a coach. According to Hutchison she just “wants to coach.” In 1989, her team won the Gateway Conference championship with 16-2 points. Besides the 28 seasons she spent coaching and administrating at Illinois, and being recognized as “winningest coach in Illinois state basketball history (men or women),” she continued her love to sport through participating in the radio for the Illinois state university sport in 2016.

== USA Basketball ==
Hutchison was named head coach of the team that went to the World University Games in 1983. The team had a record of 5–1, losing only to Romania in an early round. After losing to Romania, the USA team faced a highly regarded Yugoslavia. A win was needed to advance to the medal round. The USA narrowly prevailed, winning 86–85, with Carol Menken-Schaudt contributing 25 points. That set up a rematch with Romania for the gold medal. The Romanians started out strong, and held a 42–36 lead at halftime, but the USA team took the lead back and ended up with a 22-point margin 83–61, to clinch the gold medal. The leading scorer on the team with just under 14 points per game was Joyce Walker, who went on to play for the Harlem Globetrotters.

== Awards and honors ==
- 1984 – Illinois State Athletics Hall of Fame
- 1985 – MVC Coach of the Year
- 1988 – MVC Coach of the Year
- 1992 – Carol Eckman Award
- 1996 – MVC Coach of the Year
- 2009 – Inducted into the Women's Basketball Hall of Fame

== Head coaching record ==
Record table
Season	Team	Overall	Conference	Standing	Postseason
Illinois State Redbirds (Independent) (1971–1982)
1971–72	Illinois State	11–6			AIAW tournament
1972–73	Illinois State	17–5			
1974–75	Illinois State	14–9			AIAW tournament
1975–76	Illinois State	18–12			
1976–77	Illinois State	20–6			
1977–78	Illinois State	11–12			
1978–79	Illinois State	10–17			
1979–80	Illinois State	23–10			
1980–81	Illinois State	28–8			AIAW tournament
1981–82	Illinois State	19–15			
Illinois State:		171–100 (.631)			
Illinois State Redbirds (Gateway Collegiate Athletic Conference) (1982–1992)
1982–83	Illinois State	20–10			NCAA First Round
1983–84	Illinois State	23–8	15–3	T-2nd	
1984–85	Illinois State	23–6	17–1	1st	NCAA First Round
1985–86	Illinois State	16–12	12–6	3rd	
1986–87	Illinois State	12–15	10–8	T-4th	
1987–88	Illinois State	20–11	14–4	T-1st	
1988–89	Illinois State	23–8	16–2	1st	
1989–90	Illinois State	21–11	14–4	T-1st	NCAA Second Round
1990–91	Illinois State	18–10	13–5	T-2nd	
1991–92	Illinois State	14–14	11–7	T-3rd	
Illinois State:		170–95 (.642)	122–40 (.753)		
Illinois State Redbirds (Missouri Valley Conference) (1992–1999)
1992–93	Illinois State	11–16	6–10	6th	
1993–94	Illinois State	10–17	5–11	7th	
1994–95	Illinois State	11–16	7–11	T-7th	
1995–96	Illinois State	19–13	14–4	3rd	
1996–97	Illinois State	17–11	13–5	T-2nd	
1997–98	Illinois State	11–16	9–9	T-5th	
1998–99	Illinois State	8–20	4–14	9th	
Illinois State:		87–109 (.444)	58–64 (.475)		
Total:		428–304 (.585)			
National champion Postseason invitational champion Conference regular season champion Conference regular season and conference tournament champion Division regular season champion Division regular season and conference tournament champion Conference tournament champion

== Publications ==
Hutchison, Jill (1989). Coaching Girls' Basketball Successfully. Champaign, Ill: Leisure Press. ISBN 978-0880113434.
