= Jefferson High School (Jefferson, Oregon) =

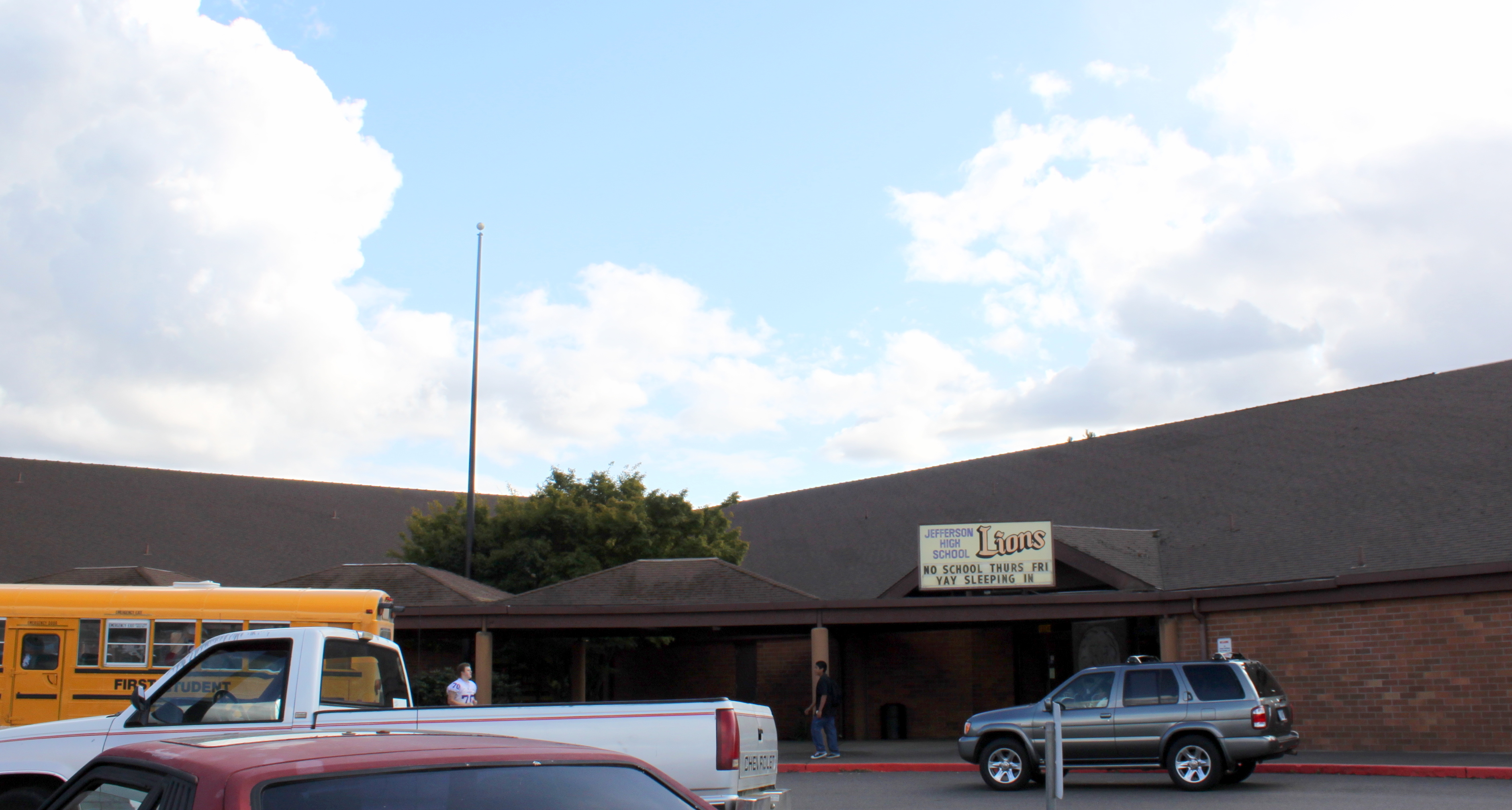

Location
- 2200 Talbot Road; Jefferson, (Marion County), Oregon 97352; United States; 44.731831°N 123.01111°W

Information
- Type: Public
- School district: Jefferson School District
- Principal: Laura Pierce-Cummings
- Teaching staff: 7.69 (FTE)
- Grades: 9-12
- Enrollment: 245 (2024-2025)
- Student to teacher ratio: 31.86
- Colors: Purple gold and white
- Athletics conference: OSAA PacWest Conference 3A-3
- Mascot: Lion
- Website: Jefferson High School

Jefferson High School is a public high school located in Jefferson, Oregon, United States.

== History ==
The current high school building was completed in 1980.

== Academics ==
In 2008, 89% of the school's seniors received a high school diploma. Of 61 students, 54 graduated, three dropped out, and four were still in high school the following year.

== Notable alumni ==
- Carol Menken-Schaudt (born 1957), 1984 Olympic gold medalist and professional basketball player
