= Carol Menken-Schaudt =

American basketball player

Personal information
- Born: November 23, 1957 (age 68) Albany, Oregon, U.S.
- Listed height: 6 ft 4.5 in (194 cm)

Career highlights
- Kodak All-American (1981)
Medals
Women's basketball
Representing the United States
Olympic Games
Gold medal – first place	1984 Los Angeles	Team competition
World University Games (Universiade)
Silver medal – second place	1981 Bucharest	Team competition
Gold medal – first place	1983 Edmonton	Team competition
Jones Cup
Gold medal – first place	1984 Taipei	Team competition

Carol Jean Menken-Schaudt (born November 23, 1957) is an American All-American basketball player from Jefferson, Oregon, who won a gold medal on the U.S. team at the 1984 Summer Olympics. Menken-Schaudt later played basketball professionally for eight seasons, including six years in Italy and two in Japan.

Menken-Schaudt is a 1993 inductee into the Oregon Sports Hall of Fame.

== Biography ==
=== Collegiate career ===
Carol Menken, born in Albany, Oregon, attended and graduated Jefferson High School in Jefferson, Oregon, a small community located in Marion County. During her time at the small school Menken was unable to play high school basketball every year as a coach was not always available. Consequently, following her graduation in 1975 Menken was unrecruited and she enrolled on her own at the local Linn-Benton Community College, majoring in graphic arts.

Menken was enticed to try out for the Linn-Benton women's basketball team and she became one of just seven players on the club. She approached Oregon State University (OSU) about the possibility of playing collegiately and received a partial scholarship, joining the team for its 1979–1980 season. The raw young player became a special project for OSU head coach Aki Hill, who helped Menken develop her fundamental skills, including a solid back-to-the-basket game in the low post and smooth turnaround jump shot.

Menken's work paid off and she was named a 1981 All-American following her senior year, 1980–81, during which she led the nation in field goal percentage at .750. Menken still holds Oregon State's career records for points (2,243), rebounds (901), and field goal percentage (.692). She registered double-doubles for points and rebounds in 55 collegiate games and recorded a career scoring high of 51 points.

Menken married in 1982, thereafter hyphenating her surname as Menken-Schaudt.

=== USA basketball ===
Menken-Schaudt was chosen to represent the USA on the USA Basketball team at the 1981 World University games, held in Bucharest, Romania and coached by Kay Yow. After winning the opening game, the USA was challenged by China, who held a halftime lead. The USA came back to win by two points, helped by 26 points from Denise Curry. The USA also was challenged by Canada, who led at halftime, but the USA won by three points, 79–76. The USA beat host team Romania, behind 23 points from Menken-Schaudt, to set up a match with undefeated Russia for the gold medal. The Russian team was too strong, and won the gold, leaving the US with the silver medal. Menken-Schaudt averaged 10.4 points per game.

Menken-Schaudt played on the 1983 World University Games team, coached by Jill Hutchison. She averaged 11 points per games, and had a 25-point contribution in the semi-final against Yugoslavia, a game the USA won by only a single point. She helped the team go on to win the gold medal.

In 1984, the USA sent its national team to the 1984 William Jones Cup competition in Taipei, Taiwan, for pre-Olympic practice. The team easily beat each of the eight teams they played, winning by an average of just under 50 points per game. Menken-Schaudt averaged 4.1 points per game.

=== Professional career ===
Following graduation, Menken-Schaudt played professionally for eight years, logging six seasons in Italy and two more in Japan. She credits playing professionally with helping to extend her playing days, thereby allowing her the opportunity to make the gold medal-winning 1984 American Olympic team.

=== Legacy ===
Carol Menken-Schaudt was inducted into the Oregon Sports Hall of Fame in 1993 and the Pac-12 Conference Hall of Honor in 2017.
