= United States women's World University Games basketball team =

United States
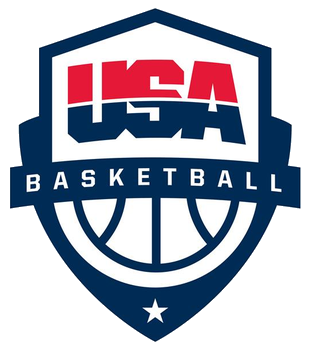
- FIBA ranking: 1
- FIBA zone: FIBA Americas
- National federation: USA Basketball
- Coach: Sherri Coale

The USA Women’s World University Games Team is one of the teams under the auspices of the USA Basketball organization. The Universiade is an international, multi-sport event for university students, generally held every other year since 1959. It is second only to the Olympics in number of participants. The United States has participated in women's basketball since their first participation in 1973 at the VII Summer Universiade. USA Basketball has organized the participation except for 2003 and 2007. In 2003 an All-Star team selected from the Big 12 Conference represented the US in Daegu, South Korea. In 2007, the Charlotte 49ers, the basketball team at the University of North Carolina at Charlotte, represented the USA in Bangkok, Thailand.

The 2015 World University Games were held in Seoul, South Korea July 5–13, 2015. The head coach of the USA team was Joe McKeown, while Holly Warlick and Tanya Warren were the assistant coaches. The USA won the gold medal.

== Record ==
- 1973 5-3 2nd
- 1975 Not Held
- 1977 6-2 2nd
- 1979 7-0 1st
- 1981 6-1 2nd
- 1983 5-1 1st
- 1985 5-1 2nd
- 1987 4-1 5th
- 1991 8-0 1st
- 1993 6-2 3rd
- 1995 6-1 2nd
- 1997 6-0 1st
- 1999 4-2 2nd
- 2001 7-1 1st
- 2003 3-4 6th †
- 2005 7-0 1st
- 2007 4-3 6th ‡
- 2009 7-0 1st
- 2011 5–0 1st
- 2013 6–0 1st
- 2015 6–0 1st

†USA represented by Big-12 All-Star team
‡USA Represented by UNC Charlotte

== 1973 ==
Jill Upton was named the head coach, and Billie Jean Moore the assistant coach of the team representing the US at the World University Games held in Moscow, Soviet Union in August 1973. The event, also called the Universiade, is the eighth event to have women's basketball, but the first in which the USA participated. The USA team was assigned to the same preliminary round group as the Soviet team, and drew them as their first opponent. The game was not close, as the USSR defeated the USA 92–43. The USA went on to defeat France and Mexico. Their 2–1 record qualified them for the medal round, but the rules of the competition carried the preliminary round results into the medal round, so they could not afford another loss. They won their next three games, all by single digit margins, against Bulgaria, Romania and Cuba. That performance qualified the USA team for the gold medal game, but it matched them up against undefeated USSR. While the game was closer, the Soviets were much too strong and won 82–44 to claim the gold. The USA team earned a silver medal in their first ever World University Games competition.

== 1977 ==
Lucille Kyvallos was named the head coach and Dixie Woodall the assistant coach of the team representing the US at the World University Games held in Sofia, Bulgaria in August 1977. The event is also called the Universiade. The team started out strongly, winning their first three games against West German, Mexico, and China, by more than 30 points each. The fourth game, against Hungary was closer, but led by Carol Blazejowski's 31 points, the USA won by ten points. Moving on to the medal rounds, the USA drew Romania. That game was quite close, butt he USA won the game 76–73. The next opponent was the USSR, who had defeated the US in the prior University Games. The beginning was reasonably close, with the USA down by seven points at halftime, but despite getting 25 points from Ann Meyers, the USSR opened up the lead and won 103–78. The next opponent was Bulgaria, which stayed close, but the USA team won by three points. That set up a rematch with the Soviets for the gold medal. This time, the Soviets started out strong and had a 24-point lead at the half. Although the USA team would outscore USSR in the second half, they did not close the gap enough, and fell 107–90. The USSR defended their gold medal, and the USA team again won the silver medal. Blazejowski led the team in scoring with over 20 points per game. Charlotte Lewis led the team in rebounding with over nine per game.

== 1979 ==
Frances Garmon was named head coach and Kay Yow the assistant coach of the team representing the US at the World University Games held in Mexico City, Mexico in August 1979. The opening game was against Costa Rica, and the USA almost outscored them by triple digits, falling just shy at 132–34. The next three games were closer, but all margins were in double digits. The fifth game was against the USSR, who had won the event in 1973 and 1977. The Soviet team led at halftime, but the USA team outscored the USSR by three points in the second half to win 83–81, the first win by the USA over the USSR in a major competition in two decades. The next game was a rematch against Canada, them team they had beaten by 14 points a few days earlier. This time the Canadian team would take a nine-point lead at halftime, but the USA team came back and won 68–60. The final game of the competition was against Cuba, which the USA won 73–60 to claim their first gold medal in a World University Games event.

== 1981 ==
Kay Yow was the head coach while Lorene Ramsey was the assistant coach of the team representing the US at the World University Games held in Bucharest, Romania in July 1981. The team started with a game against Finland and won easily, 68–49. They trailed at halftime in their next game against China, but came back to win a close game 76–74. After beating Poland, they played Czechoslovakia in a game that was close at the half, but the USA team went on to win 86–67. In the following game against Canada, the USA team was again behind at the half, but played a close match in the second half and pulled ahead to win 79–76. Despite being undefeated, they needed a win against Romania to advance to the gold medal came. They had only a one-point lead at halftime, but went on to win 75–64 to meet the undefeated USSR for the gold medal. The USA fell behind by sixteen and could not close the gap—the USSR team won 98–79 to claim the gold medal, leaving the US with the silver. Denise Curry was the leading scorer for the USA team with 18.1 points per game. Anne Donovan led the team in rebounds with 6.7 per game.

== 1983 ==
Jill Hutchison was the head coach and Sylvia Hatchell was the assistant coach of the team representing the US at the World University Games held in Edmonton, Canada in July 1983. The first game against Hong Kong was a mismatch—the USA team would outscore their opponents by triple digits, 134–23. Joyce Walker's 26 points alone were more than the entire Hong Kong team. The next two games against France and West Germany were closer, but the USA still won by 16 and 15 points respectively. The USA team faced Romania and lost by 14 points 85–71. The next opponent was Yugoslavia, which the USA needed to win to stay in medal contention. The game was close, but the USA won by a single point 86–85 to head to a rematch with Romania for the gold medal. The Romanian team started out strong, and held a six-point lead at halftime. The USA team came back, out scoring their opponents 47–19 in the second half, and won the game, earning the gold medal as a result. Walker was the leading scorer for the US with 13.8 points per game, but Deborah Temple Lee was close behind with 13.5 points per game.

== 1985 ==
C. Vivian Stringer was named the head coach while Hatchell repeated as the assistant coach of the team representing the US at the World University Games held in Kobe, Japan in July 1985. The team won their three preliminary games with ease, beating the People's Republic of Korea, Yugoslavia and Great Britain by more than 25 points each. Their next game, against China, was much closer, but the USA team had balanced scoring, with five players in double figures for points, and won 83–78. The USA team played Canada in the semifinal, and again had five players with double-digit scoring, winning 85–61 to advance to the gold medal game against the USSR. The USA fell behind by as much as 18 points in the second half. They attempted a comeback, and cut the margin, but the USSR hit almost 55% of their shots and went on to claim the gold medal 87–81. The USA received the silver medal. Katrina McClain was the leading scorer and rebounder for the USA team with 17.3 points and 7.7 rebounds per game.

== 1987 ==
Linda Sharp was the head coach, with Colleen Riley serving as the assistant coach of the team representing the US at the World University Games held in Zagreb, Yugoslavia in July 1987. The team started out with a 35-point victory over Poland and followed that with a 41-point victory over Finland. In the third game, the USA faced the host team Yugoslavia. The USA hit a high percentage of their shots from the free throw line, 16 of 19, but the Yugoslav team earned 43 shots from the line, of which they made 34. With a home crowd behind them, the game came down to the wire, and was tied at the end of regulation. In overtime, Yugoslavia outscored the US and won the game 93–89. The USA still had a chance to make it to the medal round, but to do so had to win their next game against China, and do so by at least five points. The USA fell behind, and were down 16 points at halftime. They fell behind by 20 at one point, but made up the deficit and more in the second half. They went on to win the game, but by only a single point 84–83. They won their final game against Canada, but this left them in fifth place, the first time ever the USA team did not win a medal at the World University Games.

== 1989 ==
The 1989 event did not include women's basketball.

== 1991 ==
Tara VanDerveer was the head coach, with Charlene Curtis and Nancy Darsch serving as the assistant coaches of the team representing the US at the World University Games held in Sheffield, England in July 1991. The USA team started out with a very strong offense, scoring over 100 points in each of the first four games. The fourth game was against the USSR, a team often challenging the US for the top spot, but the USA won 106–80 this time. The team fell short of 100 points in the game against Canada, but still won by 18 points. In the quarterfinal game, the USA won easily against Romania 135–53, with Ruthie Bolton scoring 40 points. The game against China was more of a challenge. The USA team shot poorly, hitting only 36% of their shots, but the defense held China to 35% shooting, and won a three-point game, 79–76. The gold medal match was against Spain, but the USA had a 13-point lead at halftime and won 88–62. Bolton was the highest scorer for the USA team with 14 points per game, but Lisa Leslie and Carolyn Jones were close behind with 13 points per game.

== 1993 ==
Joan Bonvicini was the head coach, with Dianne Nolan and Jane Albright serving as assistant coaches of the team representing the US at the World University Games held in Buffalo, New York in July 1993. The USA opened with double-digit margin victories over Israel, Taiwan, and Ukraine. Their next game was against Russia, and they held a single-point lead with just over ten minutes to go ant he game, but they finished strong, and won 72–55. The next game was against Cuba, which included sixth players from their 1992 Olympic team. The USA pulled out to a 15-point lead at halftime, and extended to an 18-point lead at one time, but Cuba proved to be too strong, and came back to defeat the USA 88–80. After beating Japan, the USA faced China, whose team also featured many members of their silver medal-winning Olympic team. The USA fell behind; their comeback attempt fell two points shy of tying the game. The final score in favor of China was 75–73. The opponent in the bronze medal game was Lithuania. The USA team won 83–73 to earn the bronze medal.

== 1995 ==
Sylvia Hatchell was the head coach, with assistants Jim Lewis, Kay James, and Clemette Haskins, of the team representing the US at the World University Games held in Fukuoka, Japan in August and September 1995. The USA team won their first five games with ease, with only the 18-point victory over Yugoslavia in a quarterfinal match falling short of a 20-point margin of victory. In the semifinal against Russia, the team was behind for much of the first half and held only a two-point lead with under ten minutes to go, but then went on a 25–4 run to take control of the game. The final game, for the gold medal, was against Italy. The Italians started with a 12–2 run to open the game. The USA cut the lead, but were behind by nine points at the half. The USA took a lead in the second half, but the Italians responded with ten consecutive points and then held on to win the gold medal, leaving the US with the silver medal.

== 1997 ==
Jim Foster was named the head coach, with Ed Baldwin and Deb Patterson named assistant coaches of the USA representative to the World University Games, held in Marsala, Sicily, Italy. The USA team had not won gold in this biennial event since 1991. This year, the USA team would be dominant, with easy victories in all but one contest. After winning their first three contests by no fewer than 38 points, the USA team faced Russia. The game had five ties and 13 lead changes. Connecticut's Nykesha Sales led the scoring of the USA team with 17 points, hitting connective baskets in the second half to give the USA a lead it would not give up. The USA went on to win the game 78–70. The USA went on to win the two medal rounds games, with a 100–82 victory over Cuba to give the USA team the gold medal. Sales was the overall scoring leader of the team, with 18.3 points per game, while Kara Wolters led the team in rebounds, with 7.8 per game.

== 1999 ==
Rene Portland served as the head coach, with Bonnie Henrickson and Britt King as an assistant coaches, of the USA representative to the 1999 World University Games. The event was held in Palma de Mallorca, Spain. The USA team won their opening two games easily, including a mismatch against South Africa with a final score of 140–32, but lost against Ukraine, 81–70. They earned a position in the medal rounds and defeated Lithuania in the quarterfinals. USA then took on undefeated Russia and won a close game 87–79, setting up the championship game between the US and host Spain. After falling behind early, the USA team kept the game close, and got within five points with under two minutes to go, but Spain held on to win the gold medal. The USA team received the silver medal. Katie Douglas was the leading scorer for the USA team, with 17.6 points per game, while Brooke Wyckoff was the leading rebounder, with seven rebounds per game.

== 2001 ==
Debbie Ryan served as the head coach, while Lisa Bluder and Dee Stokes served as the assistant coaches of the USA representative to the 1999 World University Games. The event was held in Palma de Mallorca, Spain. The USA team opened with a 134–37 win over South Africa. The second game was against Canada, which the USA team lost in a close match 68–67. The USA could not afford to lose another game if they wished to win a medal, and won the next game against Japan 106–66. The USA next faced undefeated Russia, and fell behind by twelve points at halftime, but came back and won the game 79–68. The USA fell behind in their next game against undefeated China, but rallied and went on to win 89–78. The USA then beat Brazil to advance to the semi-final, where they faced Lithuania. The game was not close, with the USA winning 70–49. That set up a rematch with China, on their home court with 18,000 spectators. The USA only had a four-point lead at halftime, but did better in the second half, and won 87–69 to claim the gold medal. Ayana Walker set a World University Games record with 19 rebounds in the game. Walker was the leading scorer and rebounder for the USA team with 15.4 points and 8.6 rebounds per game.

== 2003 ==
The USA Basketball organization did not assemble a team themselves, but decided to send a team of All-Stars from the Big 12 Conference. The team record was 4–4, with wins over Canada, Hungary, Thailand, the Czech Republic and losses to China, Italy and two losses to Serbia and Montenegro

== 2005 ==
Kathy Delaney-Smith served as the head coach, with Pokey Chatman and Cathy Inglese as assistant coaches of the USA representative to the World University Games held in İzmir, Turkey, in August 2005. The team won their first game against the Czech Republic 88–64; the 24-point margin in that contest would be the closest any team would come to beating the United States until the gold-medal final. After defeating South Africa, China, and Poland to move on to the quarterfinals, they then beat Taiwan and Russia – each by more than 50 points. This set up the championship game with Serbia & Montenegro which the United States won 79–63 to complete a 7–0 record and win the gold medal. Sylvia Fowles would lead the USA team in both points and rebounds, with fifteen points and 7.3 rebounds per game.

== 2007 ==
The USA Basketball organization did not assemble a team themselves, but decided to send UNC Charlotte to represent the USA. The Charlotte 49ers finished 4–3, in sixth place.

== 2009 ==
=== 2009 roster ===
| Number | Name | Pos | Height | Weight | Date of birth | Grad. | School | Hometown |
|---|---|---|---|---|---|---|---|---|
| 12 | Tina Charles | C | 6 ft 3 in (1.91 m) | 193 | December 5, 1988 | 2010 | Connecticut | Jamaica, NY |
| 5 | Alexis Gray-Lawson | G | 5 ft 8 in (1.73 m) | 160 | April 21, 1987 | 2010 | California | Oakland, CA |
| 8 | Tiffany Hayes | G | 5 ft 11 in (1.80 m) | 140 | September 20, 1989 | 2012 | Connecticut | Lakeland, FL |
| 4 | Ashley Houts | G | 5 ft 6 in (1.68 m) | 144 | December 31, 1987 | 2010 | Georgia | Trenton, GA |
| 14 | Jantel Lavender | C | 6 ft 4 in (1.93 m) | 210 | November 12, 1988 | 2011 | Ohio State | Cleveland, OH |
| 6 | Danielle McCray | G/F | 5 ft 11 in (1.80 m) | 169 | October 8, 1987 | 2010 | Kansas | Olathe, KS |
| 13 | Jacinta Monroe | F/C | 6 ft 5 in (1.96 m) | 166 | September 4, 1988 | 2010 | Florida State | Ft. Lauderdale, FL |
| 9 | Maya Moore | F | 6 ft 0 in (1.83 m) | 170 | June 11, 1989 | 2011 | Connecticut | Lawrenceville, GA |
| 11 | Kayla Pedersen | G/F | 6 ft 4 in (1.93 m) | 195 | April 14, 1989 | 2011 | Stanford | FountainHills, AZ |
| 15 | Ta’Shia Phillips | C | 6 ft 6 in (1.98 m) | 225 | January 24, 1989 | 2011 | Xavier | Indianapolis, IN |
| 10 | Jeanette Pohlen | G | 5 ft 11 in (1.80 m) | 168 | May 2, 1989 | 2011 | Stanford | Brea, CA |
| 7 | Danielle Robinson | G | 5 ft 8 in (1.73 m) | 130 | May 10, 1989 | 2011 | Oklahoma | SanJose, CA |

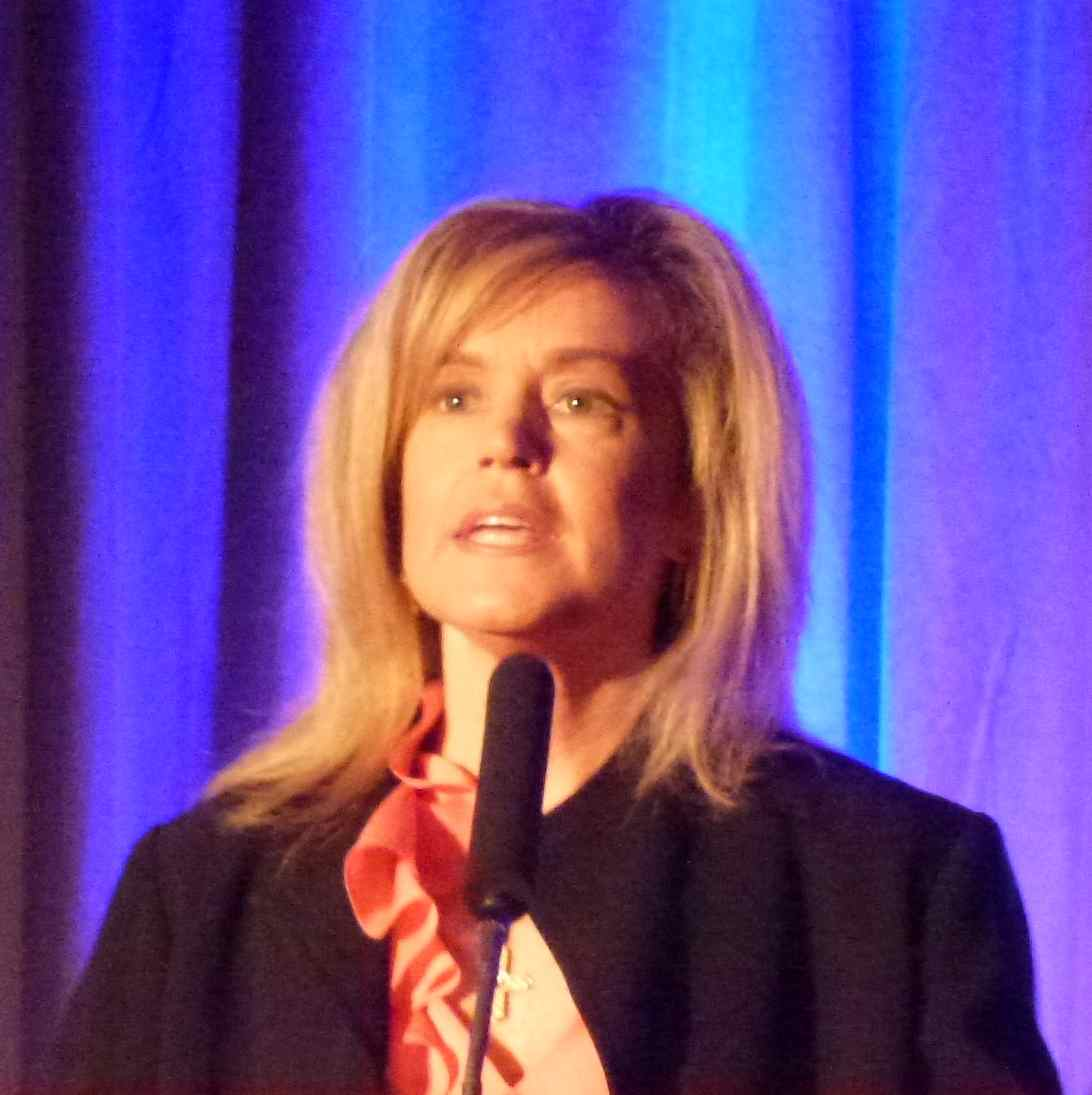
Charli Turner Thorne, head coach of 2009 USA World University Games team

Coaching Staff
| Position | Name | School or location |
| Head coach | Charli Turner Thorne | Arizona State University |
| Assistant coach | Suzy Merchant | Michigan State University |
| Assistant coach | Julie Rousseau | Pepperdine University |
| Team Doctor | Mark Hutchinson | University of Illinois–Chicago |
| Athletic Trainer | Kelley Etheridge | Hiram, Georgia |

Eligibility – The participants must be born between January 1, 1985, and December 31, 1991

=== 2009 games ===
The twelve-player squad started the official games in Belgrade, Serbia one player down. Maya Moore, the consensus player of the year, sprained a knee in a scrimmage with Australia. She was listed as day-to-day, but was never cleared to play. The first official game was against France. The USA won easily 115–30, behind double-digit scoring from five players – Tina Charles (18), Jantel Lavender (16), Jacinta Monroe (16), Tiffany Hayes(15), and Alexis Gray-Lawson (14).

On July 2, 2009, the USA team played Great Britain. As with the previous game against France, this game was not in much doubt after the first few minutes; USA prevailed 93–59. The USA team's offense was led by three double-digit scorers – Jantel Lavender (17), Danielle McCray (15) and Ta'Shia Phillips (11) – but USA coach Charli Turner Thorne credited the win to defense. The third game was against the hosts, Serbia. The USA led at the end of the first quarter 20–14, the smallest lead at that point of the first three games. The USA team increased its lead, and ended with an 84–50 win.

After a day off, USA would resume against Poland. The USA won 75–67 in their closest match so far. Tina Charles had double-digit scoring and double-digit rebounding (12 and 10), and Danielle McCray also scored 12 points. After defeating Poland by nine, the USA team faced the Czech Republic, undefeated, with a 13-point win over Poland. But the USA did not have any difficulty in dispatching the Czech team, winning 115–78. The USA team had five players in double figures, led by Tina Charles with 20 points. USA head coach Charli Turner Thorne credited the rebounding, noting that the USA team out-rebounded the Czech team by 30. Tiffany Hayes (16), Danielle McCray (15), Ashley Houts (13), and Jantel Lavender (10) were the other double-digit scorers.

Early in the semifinal game against Australia, the USA team found itself behind 13–9. They went on a 25–0 run to open up a large lead, and went on to win 81–66 and headed to the gold medal game. In the gold medal game, the USA team faced a Russian team that had played together for years. The first quarter would be close, with the Russian team leading 22–20 at the end of the first quarter, the first time in the tournament the USA team had been behind at the end of any quarter. Russia continued to build upon its lead, scoring six straight points to open the second quarter, but the USA team would follow with a 19–3 run to recapture the lead. The USA team went into halftime with an eight-point lead, and started the third quarter with a 9–0 run. The team was led by Tina Charles, scoring 28 points with 18 rebounds, characterized as a "monster performance" by sportswriters. Jantel Lavender and Kayla Petersen also contributed double-digit scoring.

=== 2009 statistics ===
USA World University Games Team Statistics

| # | Player | GP | GS | Min | Avg | Tot FG | Tot FGA | Tot Pct | 3FG | 3FGA | 3Pct | FT | FTA | Pct | Off R | Def R | Tot R | Avg R | PF | FO | A | TO | Blk | Stl | Pts | Avg |
|---|---|---|---|---|---|---|---|---|---|---|---|---|---|---|---|---|---|---|---|---|---|---|---|---|---|---|
| 12 | CHARLES, Tina | 7 | 5 | 133 | 19.0 | 47 | 94 | 0.500 | 0 | 0 | 0.000 | 19 | 29 | 0.655 | 22 | 35 | 57 | 8.1 | 10 | 0 | 5 | 18 | 1 | 8 | 113 | 16.1 |
| 6 | McCRAY, Danielle | 7 | 5 | 122 | 17.4 | 32 | 57 | 0.561 | 7 | 15 | 0.467 | 13 | 16 | 0.813 | 14 | 12 | 26 | 3.7 | 15 | 0 | 11 | 16 | 1 | 8 | 84 | 12.0 |
| 14 | LAVENDER, Jantel | 7 | 4 | 114 | 16.3 | 24 | 51 | 0.471 | 0 | 0 | 0.000 | 25 | 29 | 0.862 | 15 | 35 | 50 | 7.1 | 6 | 1 | 10 | 7 | 0 | 4 | 73 | 10.4 |
| 8 | HAYES, Tiffany | 7 | 0 | 132 | 18.9 | 20 | 49 | 0.408 | 9 | 22 | 0.409 | 12 | 20 | 0.600 | 4 | 16 | 20 | 2.9 | 16 | 0 | 13 | 13 | 2 | 12 | 61 | 8.7 |
| 4 | HOUTS, Ashley | 7 | 3 | 135 | 19.3 | 20 | 38 | 0.526 | 8 | 17 | 0.471 | 10 | 11 | 0.909 | 5 | 8 | 13 | 1.9 | 10 | 0 | 11 | 14 | 0 | 12 | 58 | 8.3 |
| 5 | GRAY-LAWSON, Alexis | 7 | 3 | 141 | 20.1 | 18 | 45 | 0.400 | 8 | 17 | 0.471 | 11 | 12 | 0.917 | 20 | 10 | 30 | 4.3 | 13 | 0 | 9 | 7 | 0 | 10 | 55 | 7.9 |
| 13 | MONROE, Jacinta | 7 | 1 | 108 | 15.4 | 19 | 33 | 0.576 | 0 | 0 | 0.000 | 13 | 17 | 0.765 | 11 | 23 | 34 | 4.9 | 7 | 0 | 4 | 8 | 2 | 9 | 51 | 7.3 |
| 11 | PEDERSEN, Kayla | 7 | 4 | 141 | 20.1 | 16 | 36 | 0.444 | 1 | 3 | 0.333 | 17 | 19 | 0.895 | 13 | 32 | 45 | 6.4 | 8 | 0 | 3 | 6 | 0 | 5 | 50 | 7.1 |
| 10 | POHLEN, Jeanette | 7 | 6 | 161 | 23.0 | 11 | 26 | 0.423 | 7 | 19 | 0.368 | 6 | 6 | 1.000 | 12 | 11 | 23 | 3.3 | 11 | 0 | 21 | 9 | 1 | 11 | 35 | 5.0 |
| 15 | PHILLIPS, Ta'Shia | 7 | 0 | 66 | 9.4 | 13 | 29 | 0.448 | 0 | 0 | 0.000 | 8 | 19 | 0.421 | 15 | 14 | 29 | 4.1 | 9 | 0 | 3 | 9 | 3 | 2 | 34 | 4.9 |
| 7 | ROBINSON, Danielle | 7 | 4 | 147 | 21.0 | 12 | 34 | 0.353 | 0 | 0 | 0.000 | 8 | 15 | 0.533 | 3 | 9 | 12 | 1.7 | 13 | 0 | 23 | 9 | 2 | 16 | 32 | 4.6 |
| | TEAM | | | | | | | | | | | | | | 0 | 0 | 0 | 0 | 1 | | | 0 | | | | |
| | Total | 7 | | 1400 | | 232 | 492 | 0.472 | 40 | 93 | 0.430 | 142 | 193 | 0.736 | 134 | 205 | 339 | 48.4 | 119 | 1 | 113 | 116 | 12 | 97 | 646 | (92.3) |
| | Opponents | 7 | | 1400 | | 152 | 400 | 0.380 | 23 | 95 | 0.242 | 87 | 116 | 0.750 | 58 | 135 | 193 | 27.6 | 152 | - | 71 | 155 | 11 | 56 | 414 | (59.1) |

== 2011 ==
Although the USA representatives to the World University games had seven gold medals in prior events, no team had successfully defended a gold medal. The 2011 team went to China, following a 2009 gold medal performance, with a mission to be the first team to defend the title. The head coach was Bill Fennelly, the head coach of Iowa State, assisted by Suzie McConnell-Serio of Duquesne University and Terri Williams-Flournoy head coach of Georgetown University.

The first game was against Brazil. The USA team opened strong, and led the game 25–6 by the end of the first quarter. Although Brazil tried to come back in the second quarter, the USA scored 17 consecutive points to put the game out of reach. Elena Delle Donne, playing in her first USA game, led all scorers with 17 points. Four other players scored in double digits, as the team rolled to a 112–53 victory.

In the second game, against Slovakia, the USA team also shattered the 100 point mark, with six players in double-figures, led by Skylar Diggins, Nnemkadi Ogwumike and Devereaux Peters with 14 points each. The Slovakia team kept the game close through the first quarter, but the USA team started the second quarter on a 7–0 run and later went on a 15–0 run to extend the margin. The USA ended with a 114–63 win.

The third game was the last game in the pool play, leading up to the medal round. The USA opponent was Great Britain. While the Great Britain team held the US to under 100 points for the first time in the competition, they only managed 33 points. Bill Fennelly felt it was the team's best defensive effort. The score was reasonably close early in the second quarter with the USA team only up by ten, but the team extended the lead to a 53–17 halftime score. The USA team held their opponents to 18% field goal shooting. The final score, in favor of the USA was 85–33.

In the quarter-final game against Finland, the result was never really in doubt. The USA team scored 21 points before the team from Finland scored. Both Elena Delle Donne and Devereaux Peters scored 17 points to help lead the USA team to a 96–30 victory.

The USA team faced Australia in the semi-final game. After not being seriously challenged in their first four games, the Australians put up a strong fight. They took the initial lead. The USA team came back, but held only a slim three-point lead at the end of the first quarter. The second quarter was close, with the USA extending the lead by one more point to lead 31–27 at the half. The USA started out the second half on a 9–0 run, but the Aussies did not quit. They responded with an 11–3 run of their own, and cut the lead to five points late in the third quarter. The USA lead was only seven points at the beginning of the final quarter, but Nnemkadi Ogwumike started a 9–0 run which put the USA into a more comfortable lead. The final score was 79–67, and the USA team would head to the gold medal game.

The gold medal game was anticlimactic after their reasonably close call against Australia. Their opponent was Taiwan, who had never before won a medal at the World University Games. Elena Delle Donne scored 18 points, added 11 rebounds and had eight assists, while Nnemkadi Ogwumike poured in 24 points. The USA team had a nine-point lead at the end of the first quarter, quickly extended it to a double-digit lead, and won easily 101–66 to win the gold medal. Elena Delle Donne was the leading scorer and rebounder for the USA team, averaging almost 16 points per game and over 8 rebounds per game.

== 2013 ==
The twelve players selected to represent the US at the 2013 World University Games have been named:

- Crystal Bradford—Central Michigan University
- Aaryn Ellenberg—University of Oklahoma
- Reshanda Gray—University of California
- Cassie Harberts—University of Southern California
- Bria Hartley—University of Connecticut
- Jordan Hooper—University of Nebraska
- Tricia Liston—Duke University
- Ariel Massengale—University of Tennessee
- Kaleena Mosqueda-Lewis—University of Connecticut
- Theresa Plaisance—Louisiana State University
- Shoni Schimmel—University of Louisville
- Odyssey Sims—Baylor University

The coaches were:

- Head coach: Sherri Coale, University of Oklahoma
- Assistant coach: Brian Giorgis, Marist College
- Assistant coach: Coquese Washington, Penn State University

=== 2013 pool play ===
The USA's first opponent in pool play was Mali, in an opening round game held on July 8, 2013. The game started with runs by each team. Mali scored five points before the USA team got on the board, but the USA responded with an 18–0 run. Mali then had a 7–0 run of their own, and the USA team ended the quarter with a 10–0 run. The USA would go on a 25–0 run, starting near the end of the half and extending into the third period. Despite a large lead, the USA was even more dominant in the fourth period, holding the opponents to just four points. Overall, the USA shot well, hitting almost two-thirds of their shot attempts. Six USA players scored in double digits, led by Bria Hartley with 17. Shoni Schimmel had nine assists as part of a team total of 34 assists, setting a USA basketball WUG record, previously 27 assist in a game.

The second game of the pool play was against the Czech Republic. The USA team started out scoring the first eight points, a layup by Theresa Plaisance followed by three-pointers by Aaryn Ellenberg and Kaleena Mosqueda-Lewis before the Czech team scored. The USA team had a 13-point lead when Mosqueda-Lewis went on a 10–0 run of her own, scoring the last eight points of the first half and the first two points of the second half. Mosqueda-Lewis ended up as the team scoring leader with 19 points. The USA team went on to win by 40 points, 101–61.

In the final game of pool play, the USA was matched against Brazil. The USA team jumped out to a 10–0 lead, and extended the lead to 24 points by halftime. Aaryn Ellenberg hit five of her nine three-point attempts, and scored 19 points, all in the first half. Odyssey Sims recorded ten assists, tying the World University Games record by a USA player set by Kamie Ethridge in 1985. The USA continued to shoot well, hitting almost 49% of their shots, but allowed Brazil to nit 47% of the shots, the highest percentage allowed by the US to date. The USA won the game 105–75 to advance to the quarter finals.

=== 2013 medal rounds ===
The USA faced Sweden in the quarterfinals. The USA team scored the first seven points of the game, but Sweden fought back to within two points at the end of the first quarter. The USA team extended the lead to double digits by halftime, then expanded the lead, winning the game 103–72. Odyssey Sims hit all nine of her free throw attempts and scored a total of 20 points to lead the USA team in scoring. The win advanced the USA team to the semifinals.

The USA team faced Australia in the semifinals. The Australian team started strong, opening up a lead as large as nine points in the first half. The USA team fought back, and were within a single point 33–32 at halftime. The USA team appeared to cruise in the second half, opening up a 13-point lead by the end of the third quarter, and extending the lead to 17 points with just over seven minutes to go in the game. Then the Australian team scored ten consecutive points to cut the lead to seven. Bria Hartley made a three-point lead to push the lead back to double digits, but the team from Australia, led by Marianna Tolo, continued to chip away, and scored 14 of the next 16 points to take a two-point lead with just over a minute remaining. After hitting a free throw to cut the lead to a single point, the USA team forced a 24-second violation and got the ball back. Crystal Bradford missed a shot but put back her own rebound to give the USA a slim one-point lead. Tolo missed a shot which would have given the Aussies the lead, and Odyssey Sims wrested the rebound away from the Australians, but the refs signaled a held ball. The possession arrow was in favor of the Australians, so they had one more shot at a basket. Tolo missed, and this time Sims secured the rebound cleanly, and ran out the clock for a 79–78 win for the USA team.

The win set up the gold medal match between the US and the host team, Russia. The Russians had a significant height advantage with a cumulative 2.5 feet of height over the USA team, led by 6' 7" center Natalia Vieru. The two teams had played each other on July 5 in an informal scrimmage, in which the Russian team had won 83–78. After trading opening baskets, the USA team pulled out to a ten-point lead after four minutes of play. The Russians cut the lead down to five points, but a three-pointer by Mosqueda-Lewis at the end of the quarter pushed the lead back to nine points. In the second period, the Russians cut the lead to as little as four points, but the USA responded, and extended the lead to 14 points at the half. The second half started even, but the Russians cut the lead back to single digits 50–42. Then Hartley, who would end up with a game-high 17 points, hit the next five points to extend the lead. The USA team closed the period with an 8–0 run to push the lead up to 21 points. After seeing the Australians eliminate a 17-point lead, even a 21-point lead did not seem secure, but this time the USA team held strong, and played roughly even though the period. The final score would be 90–71 in favor of the US, giving the USA team the gold medal. Odyssey Sims, along with Russia’s Tatiana Grigorveya, shared the MYP honors.

== 2015 ==
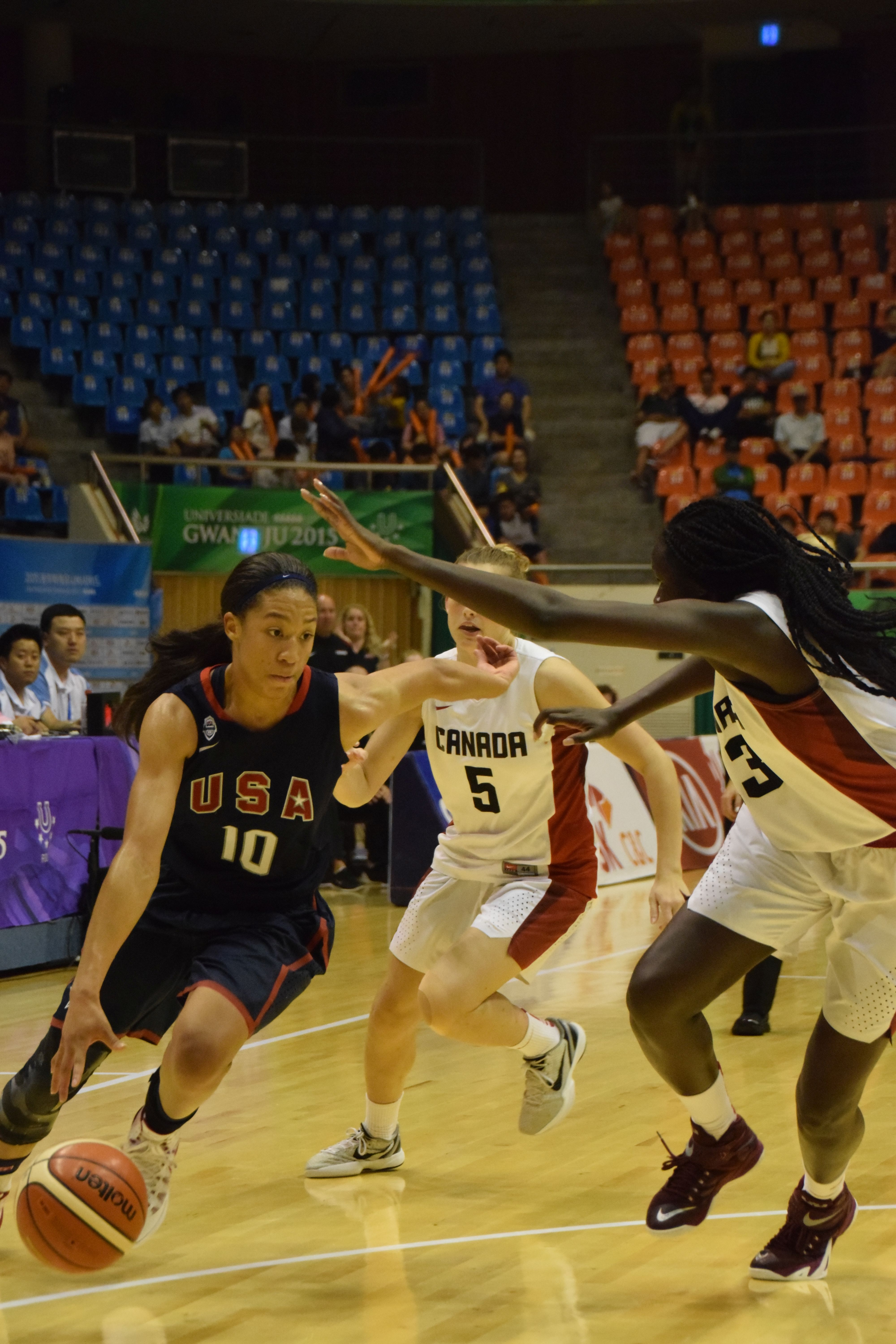
Aerial Powers driving in the World University gold medal game against Canada

The 2015 World University Games were held in Seoul, South Korea July 5–13, 2015.

The twelve players selected to represent the US at the 2015 World University Games are:

- Jordin Canada—UCLA
- Nina Davis—Baylor
- Diamond DeShields—Tennessee
- Katie Hempen—Arizona State
- Chanise Jenkins—DePaul
- Brionna Jones—Maryland
- Erica McCall—Stanford
- Aerial Powers—Michigan State
- Courtney Range—University of California
- Mercedes Russell—Tennessee
- Sydney Wiese—Oregon State
- Courtney Williams—South Florida

The coaching staff:

- Head coach: Joe McKeown—Northwestern University
- Assistant coach: Holly Warlick—University of Tennessee
- Assistant coach: Tanya Warren—University of Northern Iowa
- Team Physician: Bill Kuprevich
- Trainer: Nicole Alexander—University of North Carolina

=== 2015 pool play ===
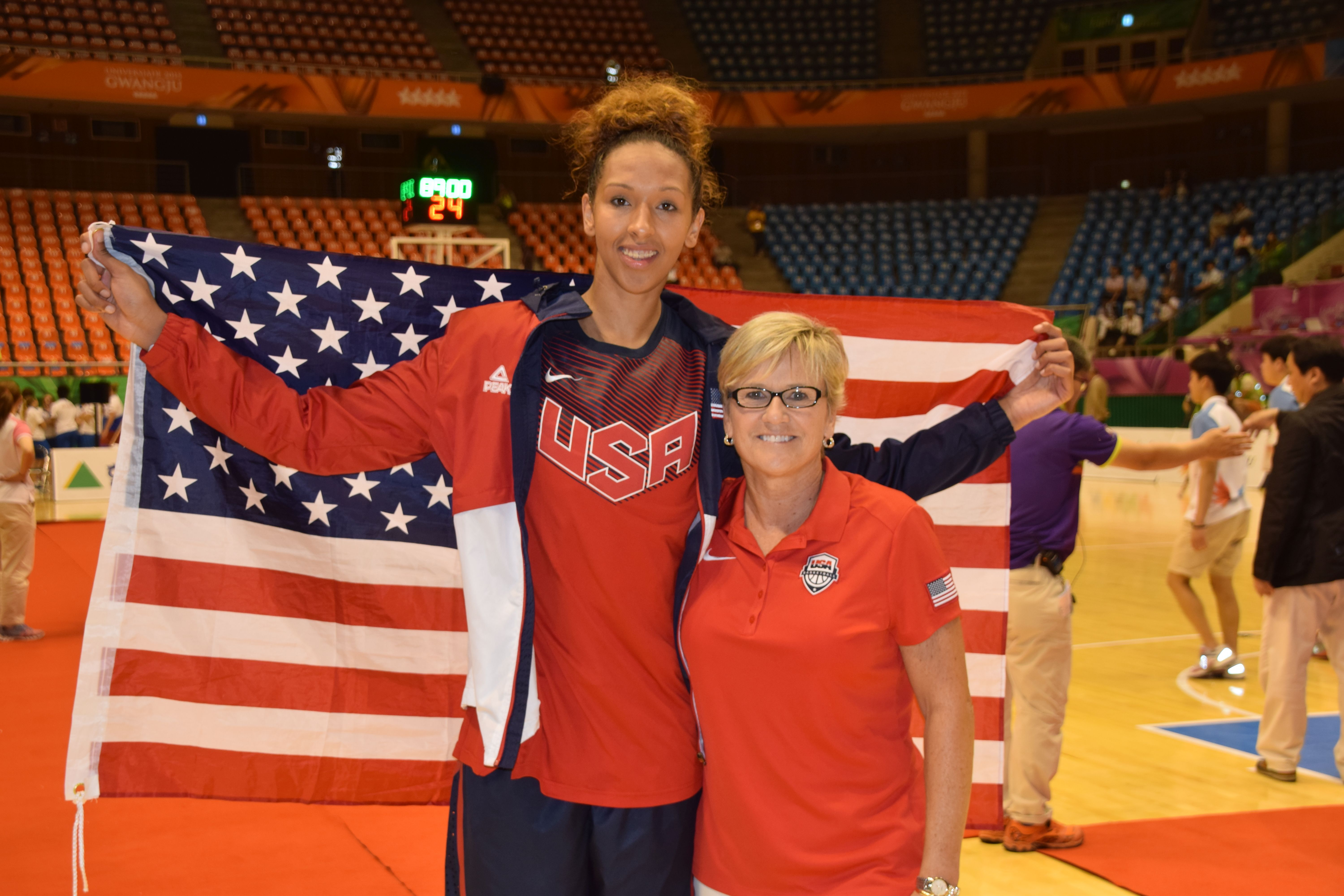
Mercedes Russell with coach Holly Warlick after the World University gold medal game in South Korea

The USA team played Italy in the opening game. After the USA team took an initial lead, the Italian team started making three-pointers, and led by as many as six points. The lead was cut to a single point at the end of the first quarter. In the second quarter, led by Powers, the USA team retook the lead and led by nine points at halftime. In the third period, Italy outscored the US by a single point. The lead was cut to six points in the final period, but the USA held on, led by 22 points each from Powers and McCall, and won 80–68. In the second game the USA faced China. The Chinese team open strong, with a 9–2 lead early, but the USA put together a 14–0 run to take the lead. The score was tied at 23 all at the end of the first quarter. USA had a five-point lead at the half an increase that by points at the third quarter mark. The USA won the game with a score of 90–75. Williams was a high scorer with 18 points, while four other players also scored in double digits. Russell was the team leader in rebounds with 15.

The USA team faced the Czech Republic in the final game of pool play. Both teams were undefeated going into the game. The game started out strongly in favor of the USA. The team hit 14 of the 15 field-goal attempts to open up a 30–15 lead at the end of the first quarter. The USA was successful in the post with Russell going nine for 11 and Jones going six for 11. Powers also had a solid game heading seven of her nine shots. Jones and Russell each had double doubles for the game. The USA won 92–54.

=== 2015 medal rounds ===
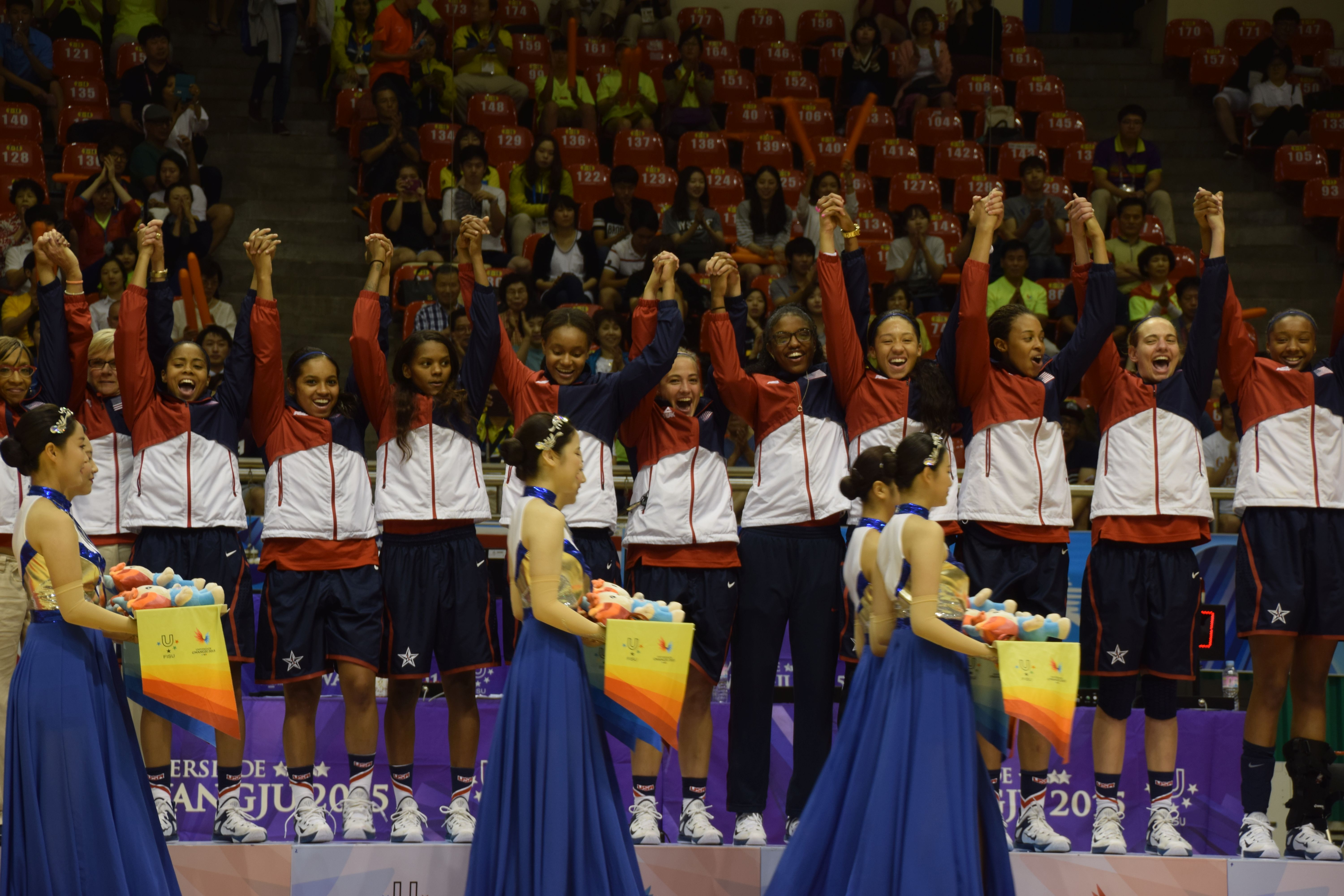
Team accepting gold medal at the 2015 World University Games in South Korea

The USA faced Hungary in the quarterfinals. The USA started out slowly, with only a three-point lead on occasion in the first quarter. Wiese came in off the bench and hit a pair of three-pointers to help spark the US team, but they were only up by five at the end of the first quarter. The lead extended to double digits by the first half but the US a team really get going in the third quarter with both offense and defense. Hungary would only score 7 points in the third quarter, while the USA scored 16 consecutive points in five minutes. Jones was the leading scorer with 15 points, one of four USA players with double digit points. The team held Hungary to 27% field-goal shooting for the game. USA team won the game 84–43 to advance to the semifinal.

The semifinal game featured USA versus Japan. In the first quarter Japan seemed unable to miss as they raced out to a 30–16 first-quarter lead, and led by as many as 15 points. The USA cut into the lead in the second, but Japan still held a seven-point lead at halftime. The USA even the score in the second half in the teens traded leads in the fourth quarter. The USA had a narrow lead late but Japan tied up the game with just over ten seconds to go in regulation. The USA had the ball and a play was set up for Russell but the shot was missed in the game went to overtime.

The USA opened up a small five-point lead in overtime and held a four-point lead with 80 seconds left on the clock but they were unable to score again in the period. With the game tied Russell secured a rebound, missed a shot when McCall went for the rebound. She was fouled attempting to get the rebound and went to the line with no time left on the clock. She had two shots, either of which would end the game. Unfortunately, she missed both, and the game went to a second overtime. In the second overtime the USA scored early and built the lead to eight points but Japan did not quit, and cut the lead to two points with 10 seconds to go in the game. They were forced to foul; Williams hit two free throws to secure a 102–98 victory and a trip to the gold-medal game.

Canada faced the US in the gold-medal game. The first three quarters the game were quite close with four ties and four lead changes. In the fourth quarter the USA exploded for 34 points to pull out to a large lead, and won the gold-medal with a score of 82–63. Powers was the scoring star for the US with 27 points. Williams recorded a double double with 15 points and 10 rebounds.

== See also ==
- USA Basketball
- Women's Basketball at the World University Games
- USA Women’s R. William Jones Cup Team
- USA Women's Pan American Team
