= Delta Psi Kappa =

American professional fraternity for health sciences

- ΔΨΚ
- Founded: October 23, 1916; 109 years ago Normal College of the American Gymnastics Union
- Type: Professional
- Former affiliation: PFA; PPA
- Status: Defunct
- Successor: Phi Delta Pi
- Emphasis: Physical education
- Scope: National
- Motto: "A sound mind in a sound body"
- Colors: Old gold and Turquoise blue
- Flower: Yellow tea rose
- Publication: The Foil
- Chapters: 75 inactive
- Headquarters: Indianapolis, Indiana; United States

Delta Psi Kappa (ΔΨΚ) was an American professional fraternity for women in the disciplines of health and physical education, health sciences, and recreation that was established in 1916. It absorbed Phi Delta Pi in March 1970 and added chapters through the mid-1970s.

== History ==
Delta Psi Kappa was founded on October 23, 1916 from a local sorority at the Normal College of the North American Gymnastics Union in Indianapolis, Indiana. Its founders were Mary Browning, Eliza Bryan, Euphemia Fosdick, Nelle Fuller, Elsa Heilich, Sylvia Handler, Florence Johnson, Nellie Marshon, Irene Mezek, Alice Morrow, Rose Quinn, Ella Sattinger, and Helen Schmitz.

Delta Psi Kappa was a professional fraternity that focused on physical education. It provided its members with professional and social activities.

Delta Psi Kappa was incorporated in Indiana on February 16, 1917. It became a national fraternity in 1917, with the establishment of Beta chapter at Stetson University. This was followed by the Gamma chapter at the University of Oklahoma in 1918. Other chapters were added across the United States through the 1970s. Chapters were only allowed at institutions with programs that met the standards of the American Association for Health, Physical Education, and Recreation.

In 1963, the fraternity had 26 active chapters, 24 inactive chapters, and ten alumnae chapters. Originally a women's fraternity, it later accepted male members. Delta Psi Kappa became a member of the Professional Panhellenic Association and, later, the Professional Fraternity Association.

Delta Psi Kappa absorbed Phi Delta Pi, a similar organization, in March 1970. The fraternity continued to add new chapters through 1975. It had at least one active chapter in 1999.

== Symbols ==
The motto of Delta Psi Kappa is "A sound mind in a sound body". The fraternity's colors were old gold and turquoise blue. Its flower was originally the Aaron Wood rose but was changed to the yellow tea rose. Its annual publication was The Foil. The fraternity also published The Psi Kap Shield newsletter.

== Membership ==
Members in Delta Psi Kappa were college students who were physical education and recreation majors with overall high academics. When it was established, it was a women's fraternity but later opened its membership to men.

== Governance ==
The fraternity was governed by a five-person grand council that met at a biennial national convention. Its officers included the president, vice-president, executive secretary, province director, and Foil editor. The chapters were organized into six provinces that were overseen by province chairs, appointed by the grand council.

== Chapters ==
Delta Psi Kappa chartered at least 75 chapters in the United States.

== Notable members – ==
- Gertrude Ederle – swimmer, the first woman to swim the English Channel
- Betty Jo Graber - Women's Basketball coach at Weatherford College for 35 years, and served as a coach and team manager of the United States women's national basketball team between 1977 and 1984, including their victory at the 1984 Summer Olympics.
