= Joyce Walker =

American basketball player

Personal information
- Born: July 1, 1962 (age 64)

Career information
- High school: Garfield (Seattle, Washington)
- College: LSU (1980-1984)

Career highlights
- 2× Kodak All-American (1983, 1984)
Medals
Women's Basketball
Representing United States
Jones Cup
Silver medal – second place	1981 Taipei	Team competition
World University Games
Gold medal – first place	1983 Edmonton	Team competition

Joyce Walker (born July 1, 1962) is an American women's basketball player who was the third woman to join the Harlem Globetrotters, following fellow LSU All American, Jackie White.

== Career ==
Walker was a basketball star at Garfield High School in Seattle in the late 1970s. As a senior in 1980, she averaged over 35 points per game, and set still-existent Washington state tournament records of 40 points, 17 field goals (twice), and 33 field goal attempts in a single game en route to a state championship, netting the still-existent single tournament records of 96 field goals attempted, 49 field goals made, 114 points scored, and 38 average points per game as well. When combined with her performance in the 1977 tournament she set the still-existent record career tournament average of 26.8 points per game. Her dominance landed her a place in the National High School Hall of Fame and the Washington Interscholastic Activities Association Hall of Fame. She is considered by many to be the best female basketball player from Washington.

In the early 1980s, Walker played at Louisiana State University on coach Sue Gunter's first Lady Tigers team, averaging nearly 25 points a game and leading the team in scoring and steals all four years. Walker still holds the all-time NCAA women's career record of 1259 field goals. She also still holds LSU career records of 2906 points, and 2238 attempts. A two-time All-American, she was inducted into the Louisiana Sports Hall of Fame in 1997 and the Louisiana State University Athletic Hall of Fame in 2017.

After stints playing professional basketball in Italy and Germany, Walker joined the Globetrotters, following the trailblazing Woodard and White by a mere three weeks.

She coached the girls' basketball team at Garfield High School in Seattle, Washington. Her early years battling the dominant (at the time) cross-town rival Roosevelt High School team are partially chronicled (with interviews) in the 2005 documentary film The Heart of the Game. The Garfield team won the state 4A championship in 2005. She now coaches the JV team and is the assistant varsity coach at Kingston High School in Kingston, Washington.

== LSU statistics ==
Legend
GP	Games played	GS	Games started	MPG	Minutes per game
FG%	Field goal percentage	3P%	3-point field goal percentage	FT%	Free throw percentage
RPG	Rebounds per game	APG	Assists per game	SPG	Steals per game
BPG	Blocks per game	PPG	Points per game	**Bold**	Career high

Year	Team	GP	Points	FG%	FT%	RPG	PPG
1980-81	LSU	**30**	621	56.6%	62.6%	5.2	20.7
1981-82	LSU	**30**	747	57.6%	67.7%	4.5	24.9
1982-83	LSU	27	744	**57.8%**	74.5%	**6.9**	**27.6**
1983-84	LSU	**30**	**794**	53.3%	**81.2%**	4.0	26.5
TOTALS		117	2906	56.2%	72.9%	5.1	24.8

== USA Basketball ==
Walker was named to represent the US at the 1981 William Jones Cup competition in Taipei, Taiwan. The team won seven of eight games to win the silver medal for the event. Walker led the team in scoring with 21.0 points per game and earned a spot on the All-Tournament team.

Walker played on the 1983 World University games team, coached by Jill Hutchison. She was the leading scorer for the team, averaging almost 14 points per game, and helped the team win the gold medal.

== Personal life ==
Multiple relatives of Joyce have established themselves in the sports industry. Her Sister Shirley Wroten ran track for the University of Washington and Arizona State University. Shirley still ranks in the top ten all time for Washington in the 100 meter dash, 100 meter hurdles, and 4 × 100 metres relay. Joyce's nephew, Tony Wroten Jr. , is an NBA player who played college basketball at Washington, and Joyce's brother in law, Tony Wroten Sr., played football for the University of Washington and the Tampa Bay Buccaneers.
