= Hokkaidō Development Commission =

Former government agency in early Meiji Japan

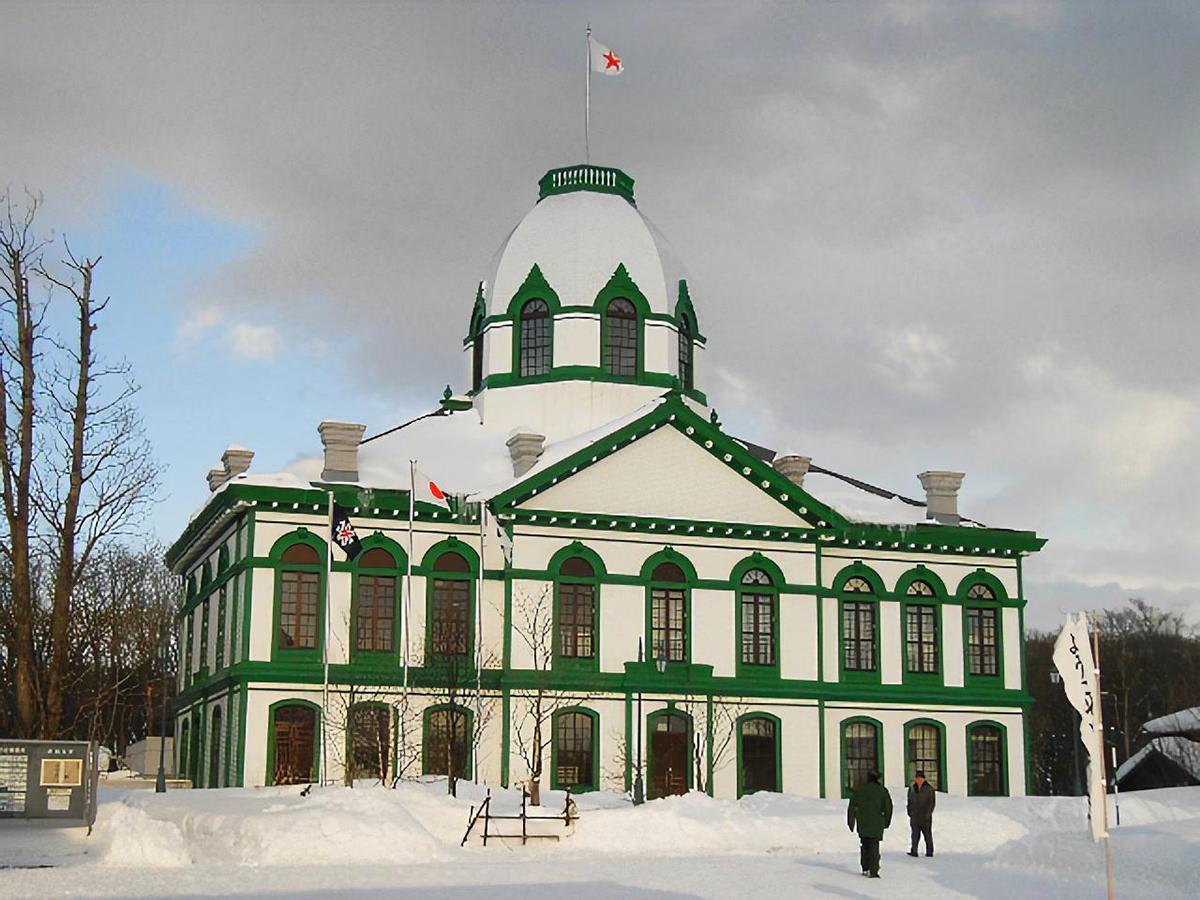
Hokkaidō Development Commission Sapporo Main Office (replica) at the Historical Village of Hokkaido; the original, dating to 1873, burned in 1879

The Hokkaidō Development Commission (開拓使, Kaitakushi), (Ainu: Yaunmosirwenteutar ) sometimes referred to as Hokkaidō Colonization Office or simply the Kaitakushi, was a government agency in early Meiji Japan. Tasked with the administration, economic development, and securing of the northern frontier in what, at the time of establishment, was known as Ezo, it was established in 1869 and disbanded in 1882.

== Background ==
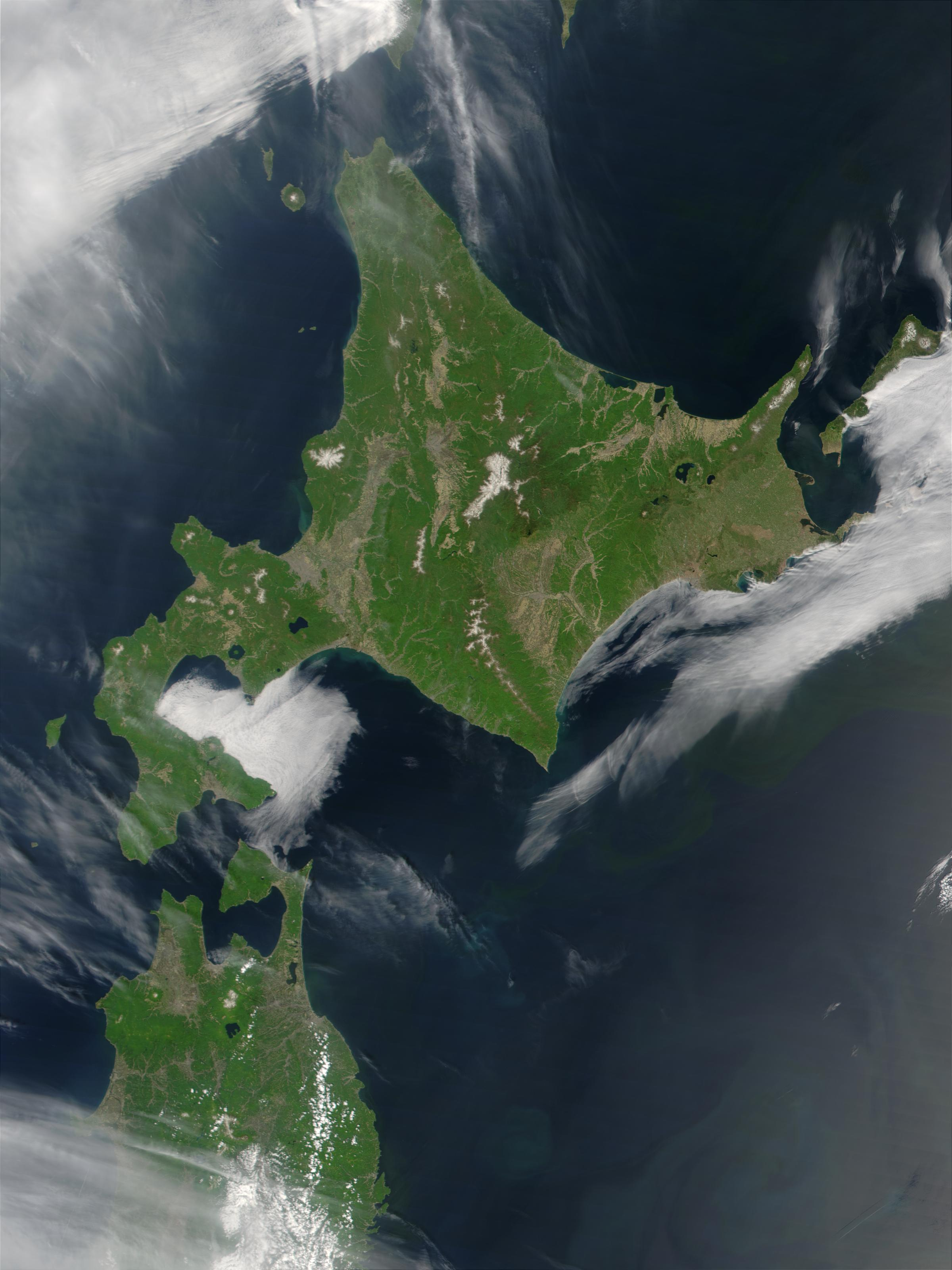
Satellite image of Hokkaido

During the Edo period, the Matsumae Domain was responsible for overseeing Japanese territory and trade with the local Ainu in Ezo (the area covered by the term extending beyond what is now Hokkaidō into Karafuto and the Chishima Islands), except for two periods (1799–1821, and again from 1855), when the bakufu assumed direct control in the face of increasing Russian interest in the region. Following the Meiji Restoration, in the fourth month of 1868, the new government established the Hakodate Saibansho (箱館裁判所), a judicial office in Hakodate that subsumed the functions of the erstwhile Hakodate bugyō.

== History ==
In the aftermath of the Battle of Hakodate, and following the return of the domains, the Development Commission was established in the seventh month of Meiji 2 (1869). Later that year, it oversaw the naming of Hokkaidō and Karafuto. From its establishment in the second month of 1870 until its disbandment in the eighth month of 1871, the Karafuto Kaitakushi (樺太開拓使) operated independently of the Kaitakushi, which came to be referred to as the Hokkaidō Kaitakushi (北海道開拓使), before its functions were reabsorbed into what was again simply the Kaitakushi. In line with the 1875 Treaty of Saint Petersburg, Japanese territory in Sakhalin was ceded to Russia, the Kuriles passing to Japan and falling under the jurisdiction of the Kaitakushi. A scandal (ja) in 1881 relating to the sale of Commission assets at a heavy loss to a consortium of the Director's associates, including Godai Tomoatsu, led to the abolition of the Hokkaidō Development Commission the following year. Initially in 1882 the commission was superseded by the three prefectures (ja) of Hakodate, Sapporo, and Nemuro. In 1886 these were consolidated into the single Hokkaidō Agency (北海道庁).

== Initiatives ==
The Development Commission encouraged settlers to come, an offer taken up by tondenhei in their thousands, albeit at the expense of the Ainu. Outlays in the ten years from 1872 totalled some twenty million yen, spending included that on the island's road and railway infrastructure, the opening of coal mines, new farming methods, and a range of other enterprises included those relating to beer (the precursor to the Sapporo Beer Company), fishing, canneries, hemp, sugar, and lumber. The commission also founded Sapporo Agricultural College, now Hokkaido University. Establishing its head office in Sapporo, which it helped develop as the island's capital, branch offices were initially set up in 1872 in Hakodate, Nemuro, Urakawa, Sōya, and Karafuto, replaced by those in Hakodate and Nemuro in 1876. These administrative units would in 1882 become Sapporo, Hakodate, and Nemuro Prefectures.

== Personnel ==
The Development Commission was first headed by Nabeshima Naomasa, former daimyō of Saga Domain, although he soon resigned on grounds of age, Higashikuze Michitomi taking his place. Former Deputy Director (次官) Kuroda Kiyotaka was appointed the third and ultimately final Director (長官) in 1874. The last found positions for many former samurai from Satsuma Domain, resulting in accusations of a Satsuma clique. Some seventy-five foreign advisors were also hired between 1869 and 1879, including forty-five Americans, five Russians, four Englishmen, four Germans, three Frenchmen, and one Dutchman. Amongst these were Thomas Antisell, Louis Boehmer, William P. Brooks, Horace Capron, William S. Clark, Edwin Dun, Benjamin Smith Lyman, David P. Penhallow, and William Wheeler.

== See also ==
- Former Hokkaidō Government Office
- Hokkaido Museum
- Hokkaidō Heritage
- Treaty of Shimoda
- Matsuura Takeshirō
- List of Historic Sites of Japan (Hokkaidō)
- List of Cultural Properties of Japan - historical materials (Hokkaidō)
