= Jabez William Clay =

American fraternity founder (1852–1880)

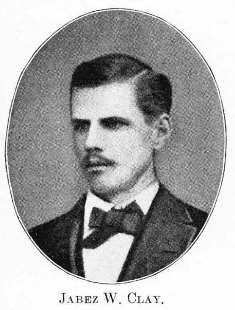
- Jabez William Clay
- Born: 1852; West Fairlee, Vermont, United States
- Died: October 1, 1880 (aged 27–28); New York City, United States
- Education: Massachusetts Agricultural College (UMass)
- Employer: William H. Bowker Fertilizer Co.

Jabez William Clay (1852–1880) was an American-born graduate of Massachusetts Agricultural College. He was beginning his career in agricultural supply at the time of his death only five years after graduation. He is remembered as one of six Founders of Phi Sigma Kappa fraternity in 1873.

== Early life ==
Jabez William Clay, born in 1852, was of Green Mountain stock. He was born in Fairlee, Vermont to William B. Clay and Martha M. (Carpenter) Clay. He had prepared for college in the Powers Institute of Bernardston, Massachusetts. Enrolling at Massachusetts Agricultural College, he was twenty-one years of age in 1873, and a sophomore when he and his closest college friends determined to create the secret society for which he provided the first glimmer of an idea. (p. 23)

== Collegiate Activities ==
"Clay was a giant both in body and in mind." (p. 16) Rand's 1923 history cites one example of Clay's physical prowess, assuming a common view at the time that Native Americans were excellent wrestlers and skilled at hand-to-hand combat: "At one time Clay roomed with an American Indian, a government protégé whom he [Clay] had tutored for admission to college. On the evening of a Fourth of July this Indian came in upon a little party which Clay was giving to some of his friends, resented the assumed slight of not having been invited himself, and during the night attacked his roommate with fixed bayonet. Clay in some miraculous way parried the thrust and grappled with his opponent. The struggle lasted for some time and was becoming truly desperate when some of the other men broke in and brought it to an end." ^{(ibid)}

Clay excelled in school, and was considered "original and creative in his thinking powers." (p. 18) During his freshman year he won the Pioneer Scholarship offered by the class of '71. Clay graduated as the second ranking student in 1875, his senior year, placing behind another Phi Sig, William Penn Brooks, who was the valedictorian. Clay's commencement address upon the sun as the great source of power was described by a hearer as "superb."

While at "Aggie," Clay was a member of the Washington Irving Literary Society, a popular pastime among the undergraduates, he at one time being its president. He was a member and officer of the Gymnastic Association, and was an editor of the 1875 version of the college yearbook. He chafed somewhat under military discipline in the battalion, and actually left school for a short while because of this. He was a member of varsity crew (rowing team) in 1873. Overall, a popular young man, his peers honored Clay at one point by election as president, captain and orator of his class.

Years later, Founder Barrett recalled, "If in 1873 there was a strong and original mind among the students of the Massachusetts Agricultural College, it was domiciled in the tall and angular form of Clay. Beneath a somewhat austere exterior, there existed strength of character, abundant good fellowship, and a humor that occasionally developed deviltry. From him came the first thought that later resulted in our Fraternity, and it was an afterthought that saved certain guileless ones from initiation into a secret society where the sole ambition was to conduct the attendant ceremonies with the most telling effect. Certain pranks of the chemical laboratory suggested great possibilities in this direction, and Clay sought reliable assistance, thus enlisting Barrett, Brooks, Campbell, Clark and Hague, all of his own class." (p.23)

While Founder Hague gave Clark the nod of credit to his role during those early days, generally the Founders were quick to praise each other's contribution with equanimity, acknowledging each provided an important element to the whole. Yet Barrett would again give the final nod to Clay: "And the leader, who was he? Seventy-five had but one leader in all matters requiring originality, foresight, energy, and perseverance. None of his class will demur to the statement that Clay was the leader of us all. It is the fibre of his mind, woven into this fraternal fabric, that largely contributes to its strength, durability and beauty." (p. 24)

The first president of the as-yet-unnamed Society was Clay.(p. 27)

Soon maturing from a focus on initiation pranks through the realization that they had something of real lasting value, Clay helped write a formal constitution and required each meeting to have a healthy literary program.

== After Graduation ==
Upon graduation, Clay, like his good friend and fraternity brother Barrett, engaged with the William H. Bowker Fertilizer Co. He moved to New York to manage the office there, remaining active with the alumni for those first few formative years. He was elected - Rand says "naturally" - to form the Grand Chapter of Phi Sigma Kappa in 1878 as its first president, and minutes show that he contributed financially to the Fraternity as an alumnus.

Clay died of pneumonia at the age of 28 on October 1, 1880, at his home in New York City. Sadly, and making his passing even more poignant, the young man was about to be married, and was finally married, in fact, from his death bed. (p. 45)
