= Xenos Young Clark =

American fraternity founder

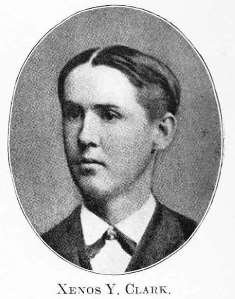
- Xenos Young Clark
- Born: May 24, 1855; Boston, Massachusetts, United States
- Died: June 4, 1889 (aged 34); Amherst, Massachusetts, United States
- Education: Massachusetts Agricultural College (UMass)

Xenos Young Clark (1855–1889) was an American student of Massachusetts Agricultural College. After college he worked variously as a draughtsman, teacher, lecturer and researcher in the United States, in Germany and elsewhere. He is chiefly remembered as one of six Founders of Phi Sigma Kappa fraternity in 1873.

== Early life ==
Xenos Young Clark, a native of Boston, Massachusetts, was born in 1855. His fellow Founder, Brooks, used to say that he was "a brilliant son of a brilliant father". --His father had been a personal assistant to Agassiz, later adjunct professor of zoology at Harvard. (p. 18) His father's final posting was at Massachusetts Agricultural College - "Aggie" - where he built the first house upon Mount Pleasant Hill. His son, enrolling, brought to Aggie a "splendid mind and a facile pencil, the latter indeed instigating many a college joke." (p. 23) Barrett characterized him as "lovable in all his ways, a genius, brilliant, versatile, perhaps erratic." Clark had received much of his early schooling in the preparatory department of Kentucky University, of Harrodsburg and then Lexington, KY, prior to his family's move to Amherst. He was twenty-one years of age in 1873, and a sophomore, when he and five others began their lifelong bond in the rooms, laboratories, sheds and fields of Old North College, one of the three principal buildings at M.A.C. (p. 23)

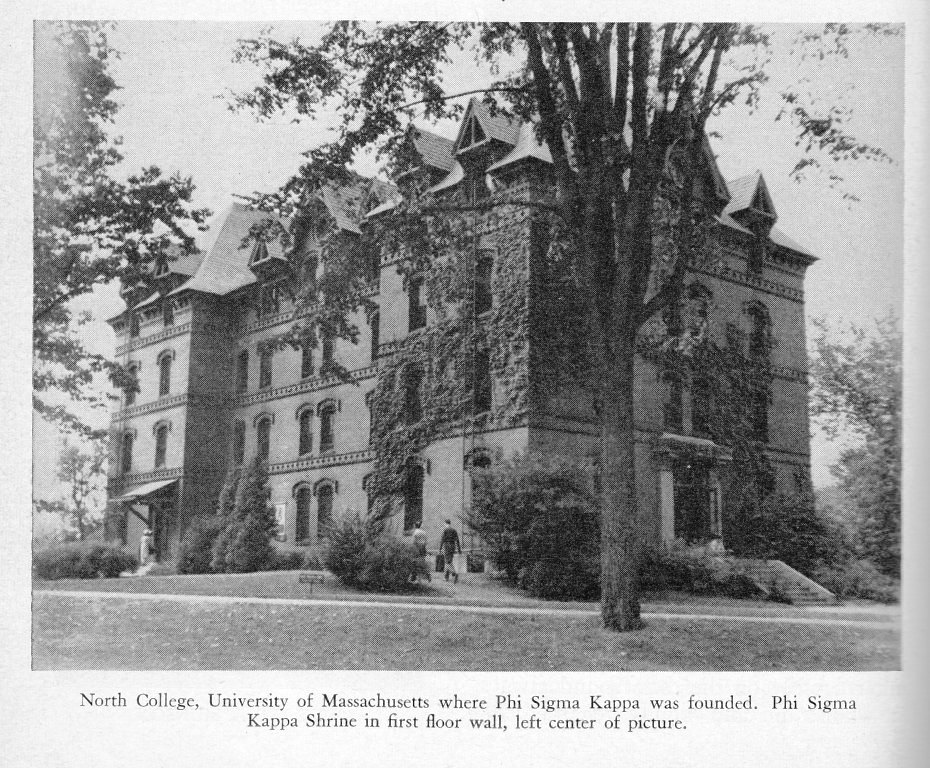
Old North College, the dorm and classroom building where Phi Sigma Kappa was founded on March 15, 1873. "The Shrine," a memorial to Clark and the other five Founders, is visible adjacent to the front doorway.

== Collegiate activities ==
Clark was a good student, and a busy one. While at "Aggie," Clark was a member of the Washington Irving Literary Society, a popular pastime among the undergraduates, and was an editor of the 1875 version of the college yearbook. He was third baseman of the class nine, an early baseball formation. His peers honored Clark by election as vice-president of his class. In fact he ranked third in his class in 1875 when he left due to 'chronic illness.'

But among all these activities and honors, it was his role as a Founder of Phi Sigma Kappa fraternity in his Sophomore year by which he is best remembered today. Clark's formative participation in the endeavor was without question: He and Clay invented the symbolism of the order. "In fact, Clark's was the eager ear which first learned of Jabez William Clay's bold Idea, and these men together eagerly advanced it to the rest."

In 1903, years later, Founder Campbell recalled, "I think it is conceded by all the original number that Jabez W. Clay was the first man to suggest the formation of the Order, and I dare say that Xenos Y. Clark may have been the first person he broached the subject to" (p. 24) Generally the Founders were quick to praise each other's contribution with equanimity, acknowledging that each provided an important element to the whole.

In those early years, while popular, Clark was never president of the as-yet-unnamed Society, demurring from such service possibly because of his illness, reported as kidney disease. (p. 27)

== After graduation ==
Clark gave the formal obituary address for his friend, Clay, who died in 1880.

Xenos Young Clark himself died in Amherst on June 4, 1889, at his home at the age of 34, succumbing to the chronic illness which he had battled all his life.(p. 68) Rand's History said of Clark some years after his death:

"A man of much personal charm and unusual ability, he had yet failed to establish himself in any permanent way. There was an element of pathos in his career. He had fallen in love with a cousin of his classmate Brooks, but their marriage was so violently opposed by her guardian . . . that she took her own life, and he became more than ever a restless wanderer going to and fro up and down the earth. He was a draughtsman for a time, assistant in natural history in the University of California, teacher in the public schools, lecturer on microscopic zoology in San Francisco, and research worker in Germany and the East. He contributed many articles, on subjects ranging from theology to pure science, to the current magazines, and finally came back to Amherst to die. He was lamented [at] the third convention as "poet, scientist, author and inventor, succumber to death with a smile, one who might well be called an immortal; his body was not strong enough to carry his wonderful mind". (p. 68)
