= Benjamin Smith Lyman =

American mining engineer (1835–1920)

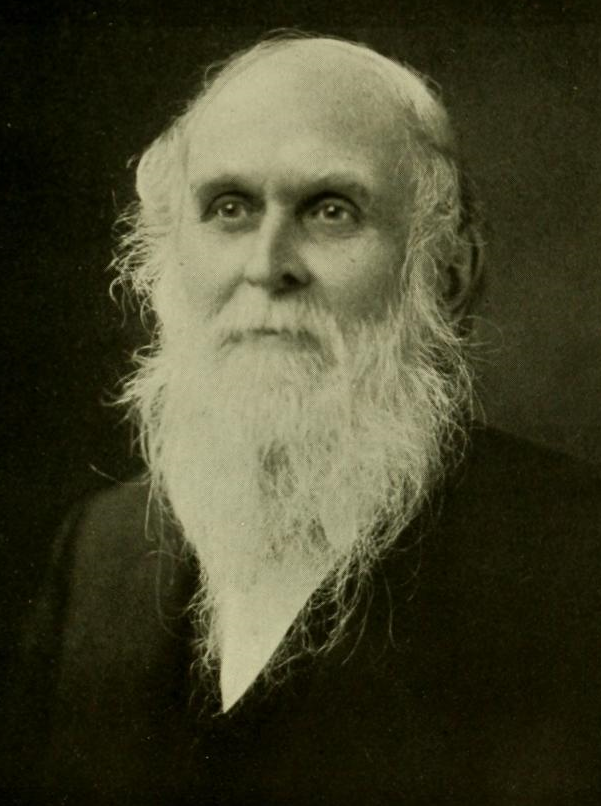
- Born: December 11, 1835; Northampton, Massachusetts, U.S.
- Died: August 30, 1920 (aged 84); Cheltenham, Pennsylvania, U.S.
- Occupation: Engineer
- Known for: Foreign advisor to Meiji Japan

Benjamin Smith Lyman (December 11, 1835 – August 30, 1920) was an American mining engineer, surveyor, and an amateur linguist and anthropologist. He was also a promoter of vegetarianism.

== Biography ==
Benjamin Smith Lyman was born in Northampton, Massachusetts. He graduated from Harvard University in 1855. After working briefly as a school teacher, he worked as an assistant to his wife's uncle on a topographical and geological survey of Broad Top Mountain in Pennsylvania, which spurred his interest in geology and mining engineering. He studied for a year at the Ecole Imperiale des Mines in Paris (1859–60), then took a practical course at the Freiberg Mining Academy in Freiberg, Saxony (1861–62). Upon returning to the United States, Lyman opened an office as a consulting mining engineer in Philadelphia and worked on surveys from Pennsylvania to Nova Scotia, Arizona and California.

In 1870, Lyman surveyed oil fields in the Punjab region for the Public Works Department of the government of British India, during which he developed an interest in the Far East.

In 1872 he was hired by the Japanese government to survey the coal and oil deposits of Hokkaidō and along the Sea of Japan coastline of Honshu. His survey identified the most promising coal fields for Hokkaidō's eventually successful coal industry as well as reporting on progress in the reclamation of waste land; the nature of the soil in various districts; the customs, physique, and folklore of the Ainu people; useful ores and stones; the development of hydraulic power; importation of foreign capital; and the advantage of cooperation with foreign concerns in the mining industry. He stayed on in Japan from 1873 to 1879 as chief geologist and mining engineer to the Meiji government. In 1874, he advised the Hokkaidō Development Commission to place bounties on bears and wolves and encourage their hunting so they would not impede on efforts to introduce livestock to the island. To this end, Edwin Dun a rancher from Ohio employed by the Development Commission, oversaw a mass poisoning campaign of the Hokkaido wolf.

While in Japan, he educated many Japanese in western techniques for natural resource surveys, and published the first geological map of Hokkaidō in 1876. Many of Lyman's Japanese assistants became proficient surveyors and some of them distinguished geologists, although his relations with the Development Commission were often strained. Before leaving Japan, he encouraged his assistants to form the Geological Society of Japan and to publish a journal. He donated his house to the new society for use as its headquarters.

In his study of the Japanese language, Lyman noticed that a necessary condition for the voicing (technically rendaku) of the initial obstruent of the second word in a compound is that the word contain no voiced obstruent in a later syllable. A sufficient condition for predicting rendaku is not known. This constraint has come to be known as Lyman's law.

After Lyman returned to Northampton, he spent the next several years working on his reports, which he published at his own expense. He attended meetings of technical and scientific societies as well as the Oriental Club of Philadelphia, and held a reception each year on the birthday of the Emperor of Japan. Although he officially retired in 1895, Lyman made a journey (1906–07) to survey the coal lands near Mount Lantauan on Cebu in the Philippines, for a New York City company that was building a railroad there. On the way, he visited his former assistants in Japan. He hoped to re-visit Japan on his return trip, but was prevented by a long bout with dysentery.

He died 30 August 1920, aged 84, in Cheltenham, Pennsylvania.

Many of his personal journals, books, maps and papers are preserved in the "Benjamin Smith Lyman Collection" at the University of Massachusetts Amherst and the "Benjamin Smith Lyman papers" (call number Mss.B.L982) at the American Philosophical Society. He was elected to the APS in 1869.

== Vegetarianism ==
Lyman, a vegetarian for most of his life, published a scholarly cookbook of vegetarian recipes in 1917 at the age of 81. Lyman travelled extensively throughout China, Europe, Japan and the United States. Based on his experiences from his travels he adopted a vegetarian diet in 1864. He was a vegetarian for 56 years of his life, until his death at the age of 84. He was described of believing in vegetarianism "with almost religious devotion."

== Selected publications ==
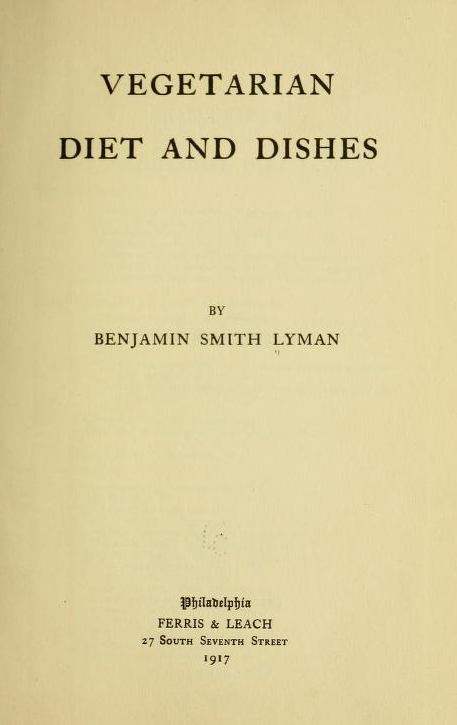
Vegetarian Diet and Dishes, 1917

- 1868 – Telescopic Measurement in Surveying
- 1870 – General Report on the Punjab Oil Lands
- 1873 – Topography of the Punjab Oil region
- 1874 – Preliminary Report on the First Season's Work on the Geological Survey of Yesso
- 1877 – A General Report on the Geology of Yesso
- 1877 – Geological Survey of the Oil Lands of Japan
- General Report on the Punjab Oil Lands
- 1878 – Notes on Japanese Grammar
- 1879 – Geological Survey of Japan: Reports of Progress for 1878 and 1879. Tookei: Public Works Department. OCLC: 13342563
- 1892 – Japanese Swords
- 1893 – The Great Mesozoic Fault in New Jersey
- 1894 – Change from surd to sonant in Japanese compounds
- 1894 – Age of Newark Brownstone
- 1894 – Some New Red Horizons
- 1897 – Against Adopting the Metric System
- 1900 – Movements of Ground Water
- 1902 – The Original Southern Limit of Pennsylvania Anthracite Beds
- 1904 – Some Hindoo Marriage Ceremonies
- 1907 – The Philippines
- 1909 – Need of Instrument Surveying in Practical Geology
- 1912 – Natural History Morality
- 1915 – A Practical Rational Alphabet
- 1916 – Natural Morality
- 1917 – Vegetarian Diet and Dishes
