= Han system =

Tokugawa Japan domain system

Han (Japanese: 藩, "domain") is a Japanese historical term for the estate of a daimyo in the Edo period (1603–1868) and early Meiji period (1868–1912). Han or Bakufu-han (daimyo domain) served as a system of de facto administrative divisions of Japan alongside the de jure provinces until they were abolished in the 1870s.

This system had been taken from the establishment in Qin-era China in which 藩 (pinyin: fān) originally meant a "fenced region" sensu stricto, but had extended to the sense of a frontier (equivalent to the European march) and later an imperial vassal state in relation to the Emperor's power.

== History ==
=== Pre-Edo period ===
The introduction of han in Japanese governance first appears in nomination of personal estates owned by prominent warriors after the rise of the Kamakura Shogunate in 1185, which also saw the rise of feudalism and the samurai noble warrior class in Japan. This situation existed for 400 years during the Kamakura Shogunate (1185–1333), the brief Kenmu Restoration (1333–1336), and the Ashikaga Shogunate (1336–1573). Han became increasingly important as de facto administrative divisions as subsequent Shoguns stripped the Imperial provinces (kuni) and their officials of their legal powers.

=== Edo period ===
A map of the territories of the Sengoku daimyō around the first year of the Genki era (1570 AD).

Toyotomi Hideyoshi, the preeminent warlord of the late Sengoku period (1467–1603), caused a transformation of the han system during his reforms of the feudal structure of Japan. Hideyoshi's system saw the han become an abstraction based on periodic cadastral surveys and projected agricultural yields, rather than delineated territory. Hideyoshi died in 1598 and his young son Toyotomi Hideyori was displaced by Tokugawa Ieyasu after the Battle of Sekigahara in October 1600, but his new feudal system was maintained after Ieyasu established the Tokugawa Shogunate in 1603. The han belonged to daimyo, the powerful samurai feudal lords, who governed them as personal property with autonomy as a vassal of the Tokugawa Shogun. Ieyasu's successors further refined the system by introducing methods that ensured control of the daimyo and the imperial court. For instance, relatives and retainers were placed in politically and militarily strategic districts while potentially hostile daimyo were transferred to unimportant geographic locations or their estates confiscated. They were also occupied with public works that kept them financially drained as the daimyo paid for the bakufu projects.

Unlike Western feudalism, the value of a Japanese feudal domain was now defined in terms of projected annual income rather than geographic size. Han were valued for taxation using the Kokudaka system which determined value based on output of rice in koku, a Japanese unit of volume considered enough rice to feed one person for one year. A daimyo was determined by the Tokugawa as a lord heading a han assessed at 10,000 koku (50,000 bushels) or more, and the output of their han contributed to their prestige or how their wealth were assessed. Early Japanologists such as Georges Appert and Edmond Papinot made a point of highlighting the annual koku yields which were allocated for the Shimazu clan at Satsuma Domain since the 12th century. The Shogunal han and the Imperial provinces served as complementary systems which often worked in tandem for administration. When the Shogun ordered the daimyos to make a census of their people or to make maps, the work was organized along the borders of the provinces. As a result, a han could overlap multiple provinces which themselves contained sections of multiple han. In 1690, the richest han was the Kaga Domain, located in the provinces of Kaga, Etchū and Noto, with slightly over 1 million koku.

=== Meiji period ===
In 1868, the Tokugawa Shogunate was overthrown in the Meiji Restoration by a coalition of pro-Imperial samurai in reaction to the Bakumatsu. One of the main driving forces of the anti-Tokugawa movement was support for modernization and Westernization in Japan. From 1869 to 1871, the new Meiji government sought to abolish feudalism in Japan, and the title of daimyo in the han system was altered to han-chiji (藩知事) or chihanji (知藩事). In 1871, almost all of the domains were disbanded and replaced with a new Meiji system of prefectures which were directly subordinate to the national government in Tokyo.

However, in 1872, the Meiji government created the Ryukyu Domain after Japan formally annexed the Ryukyu Kingdom, a vassal state of the Shimazu clan of Satsuma since 1609. The Ryūkyū Domain was governed as a han headed by the Ryukyuan monarchy until it was finally abolished and became Okinawa Prefecture in March 1879.

== See also ==
- List of Han
- Demesne
- Fanzhen
- Han school
- Shōen
