= New Africa House =

Building of the University of Massachusetts Amherst

The New Africa House, formerly known as Mills House, is an academic building and former dormitory of the University of Massachusetts Amherst built in the Georgian revival style with Art Deco accents. It is part of the Central Residential Area at the University of Massachusetts Amherst. It was designed by Louis Ross, who designed many of the dormitories on campus as well as the Student Union.

The Mills House had been named after an early dean of the Massachusetts Agricultural College (the college that evolved into the University of Massachusetts), George Franklin Mills, who had taught literature and Latin for years, and also been the college treasurer.

An incident led to a black student takeover of the dorm in the spring of 1970. After negotiations with university officials, an agreement was made to rename the house "New Africa House". The then newly formed African-American studies department, the W.E.B. Du Bois Department for Afro-American Studies, would relocate its offices there, where (as of 2020) it remains to this day. The house also features the Augusta Savage Art Gallery and the university's Everywoman's Center.
