= Louis W. Ross =

American architect

Louis Warren Ross
- Born: July 18, 1893; Arlington, Massachusetts
- Died: September 8, 1966 (aged 73); Newton, Massachusetts
- Occupation: Architect
- Spouse: Dorothy M. Pickett
- Awards: 1938- Massachusetts State College Gold Medal for Roscoe W. Thatcher House
- Buildings: Arnold House Brooks House; New Africa House; Thatcher House; Van Meter House; Skinner Hall; Student Union; Butterfield House; Greenough House Wheeler House
- Projects: Central Residential Area; Northeast Residential Area

Louis Warren Ross (July 18, 1893 – September 8, 1966) was an American architect from Boston, Massachusetts, perhaps best known for his work at the University of Massachusetts Amherst, where he designed over thirty of the campus buildings there.

Ross was born in Arlington, Massachusetts on July 18, 1893, the third of the five children of Louis Hall Ross and Mable Louisa Rawson. He was the grandson of agriculturalist Warren Winn Rawson and Helen Maria Mair. Graduating from Arlington High School in June 1913, he entered the Massachusetts Agricultural College (presently the University of Massachusetts Amherst) as a pomology major in the fall of that same year. During his time at the college he was notably active in college sports, having played on the football, baseball, and hockey teams, serving as captain of the latter. He was also a member of the campus "mandolin club" and the Phi Sigma Kappa fraternity.

Ross graduated in 1917, entering the army soon after. He would serve as an infantry lieutenant in the 166th Regiment of the 42nd Infantry Division, better known as the "Rainbow Division", in France during the First World War. By the end of the war he had been awarded a Purple Heart with an oak leaf cluster.

After the war, Ross entered the Harvard Graduate School of Architecture in 1921, graduating four years later in 1925. He would spend the next ten years working as a draftsman for prominent Boston architect, Edward T. P. Graham before starting his own firm in 1935. One of his first independent projects, Thatcher House, was designed for his alma mater as the first dorm of the Northeast Residential Complex and the oldest dormitory still in use on campus today. His first design was seen as such a success by the university (by this time known as Massachusetts State College) that he was given a gold medal at the 1938 commencement for his design and oversight of the building's construction. This would be the first of over 20 dormitories that he would design for the university, among other buildings.

Although not as widely known as his campus work, Ross would also design a variety of buildings in the towns of Amherst, Northampton{, Winchester, Needham and Newton{.

Ross moved to Newton in the early 1920s where he met Dorothy M. Pickett; the couple were wed on October 8, 1928. They had two children, a son, Warren R. Ross, and a daughter, Sally L. Pestalozzi. In the last 10 years of his life Ross spent his summers in Rockport, and continued his work up until the age of 72, only a year prior to his death. After what was described as "a brief illness", Louis Warren Ross died on Thursday, September 8, 1966. Although his namesake is confined to the Builder's Association plaques of the many university buildings, never before, or since, has the Amherst campus been shaped so thoroughly by any single individual as Ross had done in his 30 years of service to the institution. It may be said that entire sections of the campus, encompass his legacy.

== Selected works ==
- Newton Board of Appeals Building, Newton, Massachusetts (1962)

=== University of Massachusetts Amherst ===
- Arnold House (1954)
- Baker House (1952)
- Brett House (1962)
- Brooks House (1949)
- Butterfield House (1940)
- Chadbourne House (1947)
- Dwight House (1959)
- Greenough House (1946)
- Gorman House (1962)
- Hamlin House (1949)
- Johnson House (1960)
- Knowlton House (1949)
- Leach House (1953)
- Lewis House (1940)
- Lincoln Apartments (1958)
- Mary Lyon House (1959)
- New Africa House, formerly "Mills House" (1948)
- Paige Laboratory (1951)
- Skinner Hall (1947)
- South College, renovations (1939)
- Student Union (1957)
- Thatcher House (1935)
- Thayer Laboratory (1953, 1956)
- University Apartments (1949)
- Van Meter House (1957)
- Wheeler House (1958)

=== Other academic buildings ===
- Bowen Elementary School, Newton, Massachusetts (1952)
- East Street School, Amherst, Massachusetts (1936)
- Jackson Gymnasium, Tufts University (1947)
- Leeds Elementary School, Northampton, Massachusetts (1953)
- Winchester High School, Winchester, Massachusetts (1955)
