= William Wheeler (engineer) =

American civil engineer and educator

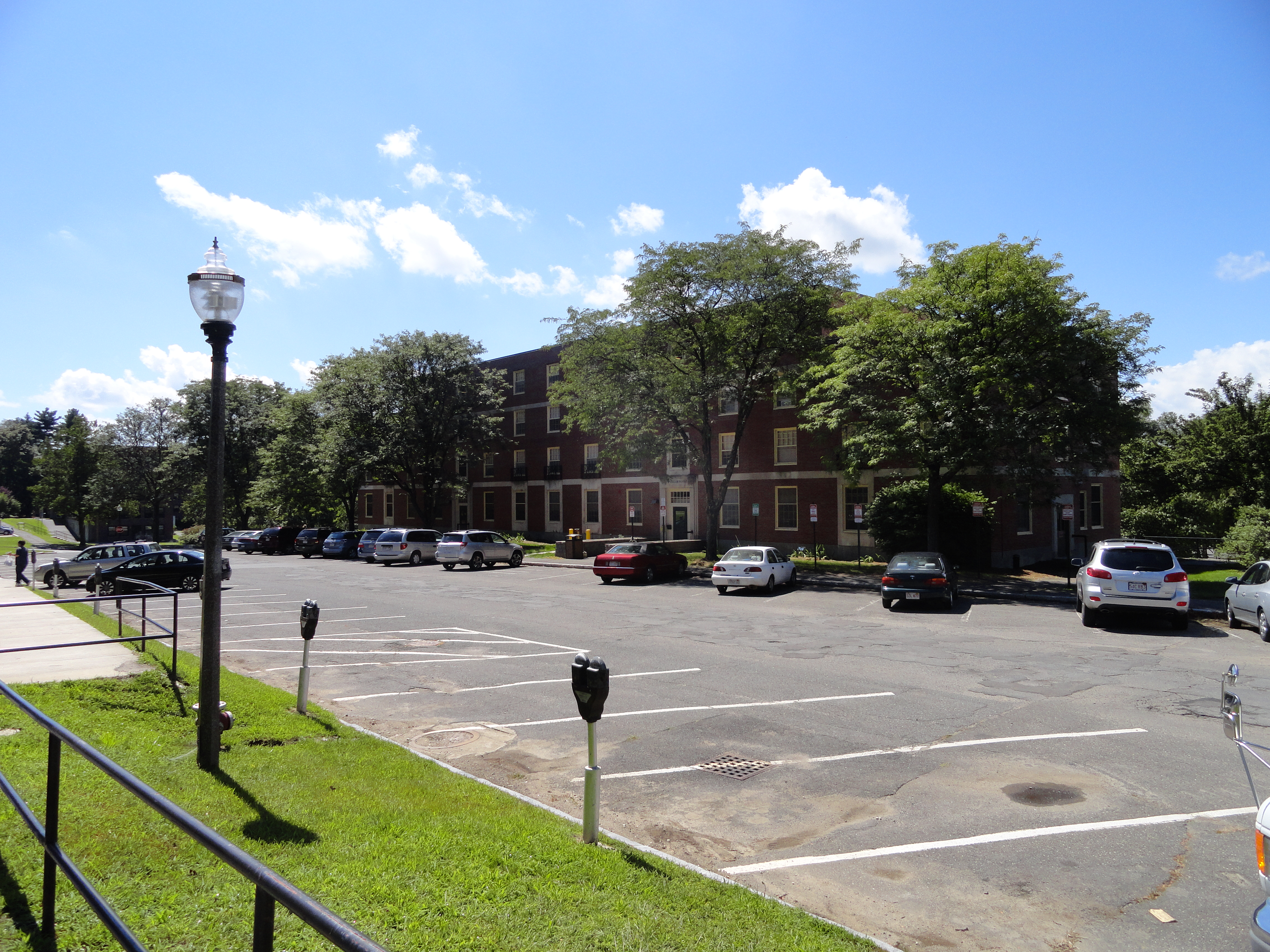
The William Wheeler House, named after Wheeler

William Wheeler (1851–1932) was an American civil engineer and educator.

== Biography ==
The fourth of eight children, William was born in Concord, Massachusetts to Edwin and Mary (Rice) Wheeler.

He was the second-youngest member of the pioneer class of the Massachusetts Agricultural College (MAC). The summer between his junior and senior year, Wheeler worked for the town of Amherst as an engineer and as a surveyor for highway construction projects. He served as a substitute mathematics teacher for the college during the last semester of his senior year. He graduated second in his class in 1871, working for Massachusetts Central and other railroad companies for two years before starting his own firm.

=== Tenure in Japan ===
Emperor Meiji, in his efforts to modernize Japan, "looked to MAC as a model for progressive agricultural education" and made contact with its president and Wheeler's former professor William S. Clark to help found Sapporo Agricultural College (SAC, now Hokkaido University). Clark was granted leave from May 1876 to September 1877, and brought along three of his former students Wheeler, William Penn Brooks, and David P. Penhallow.

Wheeler's duties included teaching mathematics, civil engineering, and English. As a scientific adviser to the Hokkaidō Development Commission (Kaitakushi) he set up a small meteorological observatory and oversaw the construction of a canal between Sapporo and Barato. Wheeler also surveyed routes for roads and railways and gave the Kaitakushi advice on their construction; in one publication he referred to railroads as 'the true pioneers of colonization – the chief instrumentality in opening up vast territories in western America, South America, India, and Australia'.

At Clark's return to the United States in 1877, Wheeler succeeded him as president of the SAC for a two-year contract, returning briefly in July 1878 to marry and bring back with him Fannie Eleanor Hubbard.

=== Later years ===
Back in Concord, Wheeler worked as a hydraulic engineer, was active in business and community affairs and served as a trustee of Massachusetts Agricultural College (1887–1929). In 1880, Wheeler patented "a novel form of lighting that he commercialized through the Wheeler Reflector Company, a highly profitable company that was an important manufacturer of street lighting into the middle of the twentieth century." He kept a journal during his exploration of Death Valley, California in 1900, one of the objects in the University of Massachusetts's Wheeler Papers collection.

In 1924, in recognition of his contributions, the Japanese government awarded Wheeler the Order of the Rising Sun, Fifth Class.

Wheeler named his Concord estate Maru-Yama Kwan in memory of his stay in Sapporo, and stayed there until his death in July 1932.

== Legacy ==
As mentioned previously, the Wheeler Papers is a collection held at the University of Massachusetts. The majority is of letters Wheeler wrote home while at the SAC, which includes "excellent accounts of travel in Japan," "Wheeler's impressions of Japanese culture," and "detailed insight into the work involved in establishing [the SAC]." However, there are also copies of documents from Hokkaido University related to his tenure there as President, as well as two biographical sketches, post-Japan letters, the aforementioned Death Valley travel journal, and the awarded Order medal.

The William Wheeler House, an undergraduate residence hall at his alma mater, is named after him.

A Japanese author Tetsuo Takasaki took interest in Wheeler and with the help of several American contacts in Concord authored a biography in 2004. Titled "Hyōden oyatoi Amerikajin seinen kyōshi: Uiriamu Hoīrā", it was translated by Kazue Campbell, a former professor at Boston University, into English in 2009 as "William Wheeler-A Young American Professor in Meiji Japan."
