= Joseph Barrett =

Joseph Barrett may refer to:

- Joseph Francis Barrett (1854–1918), American agricultural supply company executive
- Joseph Osgood Barrett (1823–1898), American spiritualist
- Joe Barrett (1902–1952), Gaelic football player

== See also ==
- Joe Barratt (1895–1968), English footballer
