= Thomas Blakiston =

British zoologist (1832–1891)

Thomas Wright Blakiston
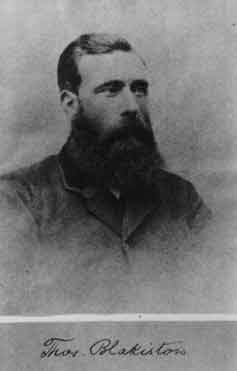
- Born: 27 December 1832; Lymington, Hampshire, England
- Died: 15 October 1891 (aged 58); San Diego, California, U.S.
- Resting place: Green Lawn Cemetery, Columbus, Ohio, U.S.
- Occupations: Naturalist and explorer
- Known for: "Blakiston's Line", a zoogeographical boundary
- Spouse: Ann Mary Dun
- Children: 2
- Parents: John Blakiston (father); Jane Wright (mother)
- Relatives: Edwin Dun (brother-in-law)
- Scientific career
- Author abbrev. (zoology): Blakiston

Thomas Wright Blakiston (27 December 1832 – 15 October 1891) was an English explorer and naturalist.

== Early life and career ==
Born in Lymington, Hampshire, Thomas Blakiston was the son of Major John Blakiston. His grandfather was Sir Matthew Blakiston, 2nd Baronet Blakiston. His mother Jane was the daughter of Reverend Thomas Wright, Rector of Market Bosworth, Leicestershire.

Blakiston explored western Canada with the Palliser Expedition between 1857 and 1859. Mount Blakiston, the highest point in Waterton Lakes National Park, was named for him in 1858. In 1861, he traveled up the Yangtze River in China, going further than any Westerner before him. He spent the next part of his life in Japan and became one of the major naturalists in that country. Blakiston was the first person to notice that animals in Hokkaidō, Japan's northern island, were related to northern Asian species, whereas those on Honshū to the south were related to those from southern Asia. The Tsugaru Strait between the two islands was therefore established as a zoogeographical boundary, and became known as "Blakiston's Line". Blakiston collected an owl specimen in Hakodate, Japan in 1883. This was later described by Henry Seebohm and named Blakiston's fish owl.

He moved to the United States in 1885.

== Personal life and death ==
Blakiston married Ann Mary Dun in 1885. She was the daughter of James Dun and the sister of Edwin Dun. They had one daughter and one son. Ann Mary survived him by 46 years and died in England in March 1937.

Blakiston died of pneumonia in October 1891 while in San Diego, California. He was buried at Green Lawn Cemetery in Columbus, Ohio, in his wife's family plot.

== Bibliography ==
- Lee, Sidney, ed. (1901). "Blakiston, Thomas Wright" . Dictionary of National Biography (1st supplement). London: Smith, Elder & Co.
- Lundy, Darryl. "FAQ". The Peerage.
- Ibis Jubilee supplement 1908
