= Carl Köppen =

Carl Kōppen
- Born: 23 August 1833; Bückeburg, Lower Saxony
- Died: 28 June 1907 (aged 73); Neumünster, Germany

Carl Köppen (23 August 1833 - 28 June 1907) was a German military advisor active in Japan at the start of the Meiji era.

== Biography ==
A member of the Schaumburg-Lippe Jäger Battalion who rose rapidly through the ranks, Köppen was invited to teach in Japan as a foreign advisor providing training to troops loyal to the Kishū Domain. Based at Wakayama Castle between 1869 and 1871, Köppen specialized in Prussian Army drills and the use of the Doersch and von Baumgarten Needle gun.
