= Frederick George Campbell =

American sheep breeder and rancher

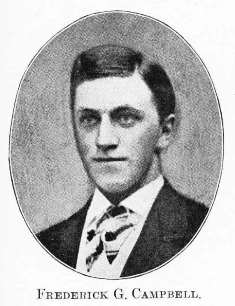
- Frederick George Campbell
- Born: August 19, 1853; Westminster West, Vermont, United States
- Died: June 13, 1929 (aged 75); Westminster West, Vermont, United States
- Education: Massachusetts Agricultural College (UMass)
- Employer(s): Self-employed rancher, local politician

Frederick George Campbell (1853–1929) was an American sheep breeder and rancher from the Green Mountains of Vermont. He is chiefly known as one of six founders of Phi Sigma Kappa fraternity in 1873.

== Early life ==
Frederick George Campbell, born and bred in the Green Mountains, much like co-Founder Clay, was from the small town of Westminster West, Vermont. He prepared for college at the Powers Institute in Bernardston, Massachusetts. His father had an international reputation as a breeder of fine-wooled, American, Merino sheep. "Indeed a pen of his sheep took the sweepstake prize at Hamburg, and were thereupon sold to a Continental breeder for $5,000;" a great sum of money at the time. (p. 18) Campbell was exceedingly practical in his philosophy of life, and would drolly say of some of his college work, "Now that isn't going to be of any use to me." While not like Clay, bubblingly original and creative in his thinking powers, he seems still to have been a dynamic force in putting a presented idea into actual operation. (p. 18)

== Collegiate activities ==
Like many of his fellow Founders, Campbell participated in an array of collegiate activities. While at Aggie he was a member of the Washington Irving Literary Society, a popular pastime among the undergraduates. Campbell was a member of the Gymnastic Association, and like others of the Fraternity's Founders held the military rank of lieutenant in the College's Battalion. In 1875, he graduated fifth among all graduating students, with only fellow Phi Sigs ahead of him. His peers honored Campbell by election as vice-president and treasurer of his class.

But among all these activities and honors, it was his role as a Founder of Phi Sigma Kappa fraternity in his Sophomore year by which he is best remembered today. Rand's History summarizes that Campbell's ability to assess and deliver a pragmatic outcome of a bare idea was his genius, and his contribution to the Order.

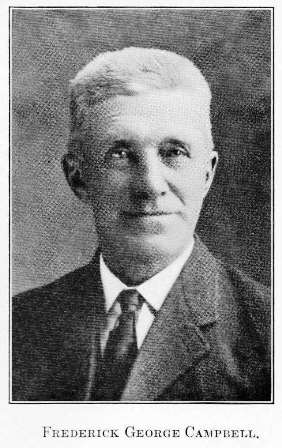
Frederick George Campbell, at 50 years of age.

== Later years ==
True to his pragmatism, Campbell soon returned to Vermont and the family farm. He married Miss Emma L. Harlow Oct. 15, 1875, the year of his graduation. They couple had seven children, all born in Westminster West:

- Harry Harlow, b. May 23, 1876.
- Frank Walter, b. Sept. 26, 1877.
- Helen Louise, b. Mar. 15, 1880; m. Dec. 20, 1899 to Mr. John Piddock, Helen died in Mexico, 1900.
- Mary Wardwell, b. Dec. 23, 1881.
- George, b. Sept. 11, 1883.
- Lena Morris, b. Mar. 21, 1887.
- Edward Raymond, b. June 5, 1891.

Campbell served briefly in the Vermont Legislature.

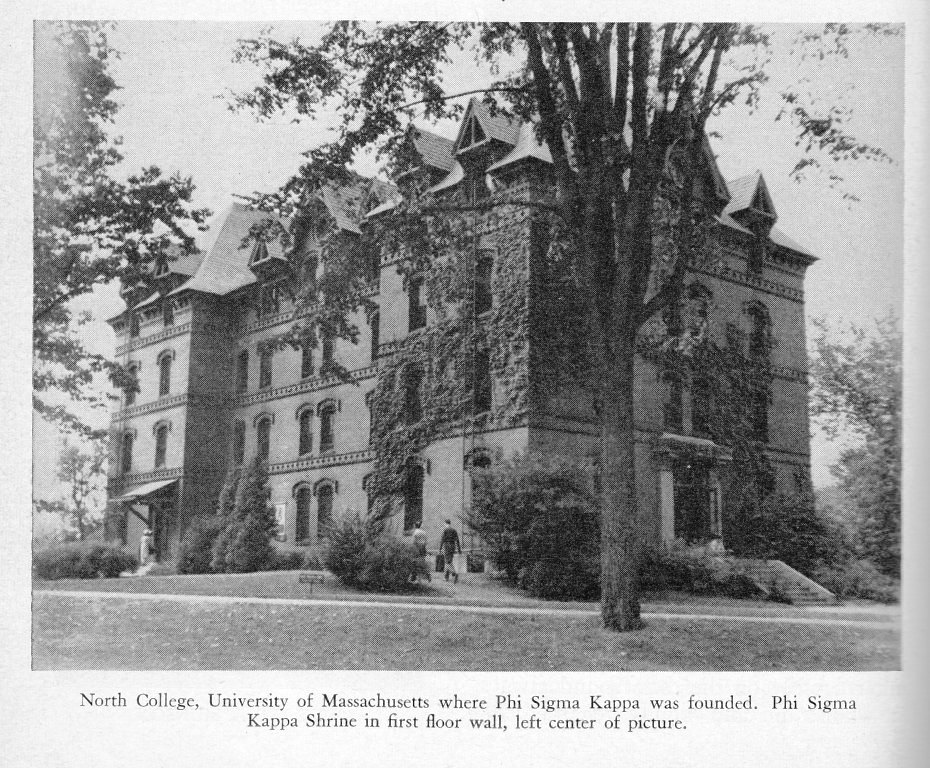
Old North Hall, site of ΦΣΚ's founding in 1873, at the University of Massachusetts Amherst. "The Shrine," a memorial to the Founders, is visible at the left of the front door. Campbell was present for its dedication.

== Continued fraternal activity ==
Though busy with his farm and a growing family, Campbell remained in touch with the fellows back at Amherst: Rand's History notes that Campbell donated a supply of maple sugar at the occasion of the Order's move from its original rooms to a larger space in the Spring of 1878. He was occasionally present at reunions and Grand Chapter meetings held in the Boston area, and was a regular at Amherst. While not an alumnus officer, he remained admired, as were all the Founders. When younger brethren would ply them for interviews, the Founders were quick to praise each other's contribution with equanimity, acknowledging that each provided an important element to the whole. Campbell continued to correspond regularly with Grand Chapter and Alpha chapter leaders all his life.

With Founder Brooks, Campbell made a pilgrimage to Amherst on May 12, 1923, for the dedication of "The Shrine," a plaque honoring the fraternity that was dedicated on the wall of Old North, the dormitory where the now thriving Order had been founded 50 years prior. (Old North was razed for the construction of Machmer Hall in 1957, and The Shrine was moved to the entrance of the new building.) The two followed up this appearance by joining the 1926 Convention in Philadelphia, and to the surprise and joy of many, they both traveled nearly 3,000 miles to the 1928 San Francisco Convention of the Fraternity. (pp. 98–100)

Campbell died at home in Vermont, suddenly, on June 13, 1929, at the age of 75. (p. 101)
