= Heinrich Waentig =

German economist and politician

Heinrich Eugen Waentig
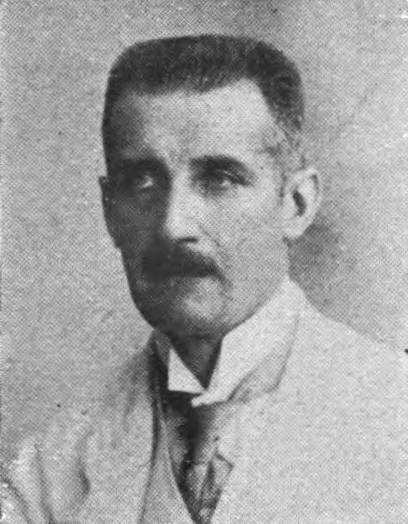
- Waentig c. 1921
- Born: Heinrich Eugen Waentig; 21 March 1870; Zwickau, Kingdom of Saxony
- Died: 22 December 1943 (aged 73); Baden-Baden, Germany
- Education: Leipzig University
- Occupations: Economist, politician, educator
- Known for: Foreign advisor to Meiji Japan, Prussian Minister of the Interior

Heinrich Eugen Waentig (21 March 1870 – 22 December 1943) was a German economist and politician. Waentig was born in Zwickau, Saxony. Between 1888 and 1893, he studied at several universities, including the Ludwig-Maximilians-Universität München, the Friedrich Wilhelm University of Berlin, Leipzig University, and the University of Vienna, earning his doctorate at Leipzig. He later traveled to the United States and East Asia.

In 1895, Waentig completed his habilitation at Marburg University and became a Privatdozent. The following year, he was appointed professor extraordinarius and later professor ordinarius at the University of Greifswald. He subsequently held positions at the University of Münster and Martin Luther University Halle-Wittenberg.

From 1909 to 1913, Waentig worked in Japan as an advisor to the Meiji government, lecturing in political economics and financial science at the Tokyo Imperial University. Returning to Germany in 1913, he resumed his academic role at Halle until 1933. He was elected to the Prussian Landtag in 1920 under the Social Democratic Party of Germany (SPD). In 1927, he became Oberpräsident of the Province of Saxony and was appointed Prussian Minister of the Interior in 1930. After resigning from the SPD in 1931 due to internal disagreements, he retired from politics. Waentig died in Baden-Baden, Germany, in 1943.

== Works ==
- Gewerbliche Mittelstandspolitik. Eine rechtshistorisch-wirtschaftspolitische Studie auf Grund österreichischer Quellen (1898)
- Die japanische Revolution 1867 (The Japanese revolution of 1867) (1920)
- Herausgabe: Sammlung sozialwissenschaftlicher Meister (1903–1910)
