= Louis Boehmer =

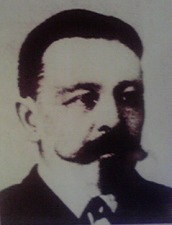
- Louis Boehmer
- Born: May 30, 1843; Lüneburg, Kingdom of Hanover
- Died: July 29, 1896 (aged 53); Lüneburg, Germany
- Occupation: Agronomist

Louis Boehmer (30 May 1843 - 29 July 1896) was an ethnic German-American agronomist and government advisor in Meiji period Japan who later worked as a success entrepreneur in Yokohama.

== Biography ==
Louis Boehmer was born in Lüneburg in the Kingdom of Hanover. He apprenticed as a gardener, and received an appointment to tend the royal gardens of the Kingdom of Hannover. However, after the Franco-Prussian War of 1867, he immigrated to America and become a successful gardener in Rochester, New York. In January 1871, when Kuroda Kiyotaka was in the United States hiring foreign advisors for his Hokkaidō Colonization Office, Boehmer was recommended as a horticulturist by a mutual friend of Horace Capron.

Boehmer arrived in Yokohama, Japan on March 23, 1872 and was initially placed in charge of an experimental farm in Aoyama, Tokyo where he raised carrots, potatoes, asparagus, as well as wheat, barley and soybeans. He also planted apple, cherry, peach and pear fruit trees as well as grapes, and introduced new varieties of livestock.

With the end of the Boshin War, the Japanese government redoubled its efforts to settle Hokkaidō, especially with displaced former samurai from pro-Tokugawa shogunate domains. Boehler arrived in Hakodate on May 19, 1874 and spent the next five months travelling around the island exploring sites for experimental government farms. While in Saru District, he discovered the local Ainu people growing hops, which when combined with locally-grown barley enabled him to recommend to Horace Capon at the nearby Sapporo Agricultural College that a brewery be established. The new operation was run by Edwin Dun and exists to this date under the name of Sapporo Breweries. Boehler transferred to Sapporo in 1876, where he assisted Edwin Dun for several years.

After the break-up of Hokkaidō Colonization Office in 1882, Boehmer established his own nursery in Yamate, Yokohama, trading under the name of L. Boehmer & Company. The firm specialized in exporting Japanese plants to Europe and the United States, and supplied plants and flowers to the German Emperor and helped popularize the Japanese art of bonsai in the western world. Boehmer retired in 1890, selling the business to fellow expatriate German businessman Alfred Unger, but the company continued to operate under his name until 1908. On October 13, 1894 Boehler departed Japan due to failing health. He died in his native Germany on July 29, 1896.
