= Georges Hilaire Bousquet =

French legal scholar

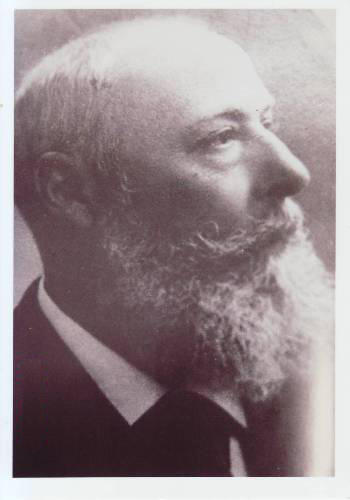
- Born: March 3, 1845; Paris, France
- Died: January 15, 1937 (aged 91); Paris, France
- Occupation: legal scholar

Georges Hilaire Bousquet (March 3, 1845 – January 15, 1937) was a French legal scholar who contributed to the development of the legal codes of the Empire of Japan.

== Biography ==
Bousquet was born in the 16th arrondissement of Paris, France. He was a graduate of the University of Paris and was working as a lawyer for the Court of Appeals in Paris when approached by Samejima Naonobu, a Japanese diplomat recruiting foreign advisors for the government of Meiji period Japan on December 24, 1871. Bousquet sailed from the port of Marseille on February 16, 1872. Aged only 26 at the time, Bousquet was assigned to work with fellow Frenchman Gustave Emile Boissonade for four years. He assisted in translation of the Napoleonic Code in the Japanese language, and in drafting much of Japan's civil code.

Bousquet also taught at the Meihoryo (Law School of the Ministry of Justice).

After his return to France, he resumed his legal career, rising to the post of Deputy Director of Criminal Justice in France, and was subsequently elected to the Council of State in July 1879. In January 1898, he became Director of the Customs Department under the French Ministry of Finance, and is noted for having reduced import taxes on Japanese sake into France. He was awarded the Order of the Rising Sun (2nd class) in October of the same year.

Bousquet also wrote a book Le Japon de Nos Jours et les Echelles de l'Extreme Orient: Ouvrage Contenant Trois Cartes in 1877, describing his time in Japan. The work is notable as perhaps the first European attempt to describe the contents of The Tale of Genji, which would later be regarded as a classic of world literature, although Bousquet confused it with The Tale of the Heike.

He died in Paris in 1937, and his grave is at the Montmartre Cemetery.
