= Cecil H. Peabody =

American mechanical engineer

Cecil Hobart Peabody
- Cecil Hobart Peabody (1912)
- Born: August 9, 1855; Burlington, Vermont, U.S.
- Died: May 4, 1934 (aged 78); Boston, Massachusetts, U.S.
- Known for: Throttling calorimeter Steam tables Temperature-entropy tables Founding MIT's naval architecture program
- Spouse: Sarah Angeline Knight (m. 1885)
- Parent(s): Selim Peabody; Mary Elizabeth Pangborn
- Awards: Order of the Rising Sun, 3rd Class

Academic background
- Education: Massachusetts Institute of Technology (SB, 1877)

Academic work
- Discipline: Mechanical engineer
- Sub-discipline: Thermodynamics, naval architecture, marine engineering
- Institutions: Sapporo Agricultural College; University of Illinois; Massachusetts Institute of Technology
- Notable works: Tables of the Properties of Saturated Steam and Other Vapors (1888); Thermodynamics of the Steam-Engine and Other Heat-Engines (1889)

Cecil Hobart Peabody (August 9, 1855 – May 4, 1934) was an American mechanical engineer and an authority on thermodynamics. He published widely used tables of the properties of steam and other vapors, invented the throttling calorimeter for measuring the moisture content of steam, and wrote numerous textbooks on heat engines, steam boilers, and naval architecture.

After graduating from the Massachusetts Institute of Technology (MIT) in 1877, Peabody taught at the Sapporo Agricultural College in Japan and at the University of Illinois before joining the MIT faculty in 1883, where he remained for 37 years. He introduced the Institute's first courses in marine engineering and naval architecture and became the founding head of its department of naval architecture in 1893, a post he held until his retirement in 1920. Peabody was elected to the American Academy of Arts and Sciences in 1889; the Emperor of Japan conferred on him the Order of the Rising Sun, 3rd Class, and the Japanese Ministry of Education awarded him a doctorate in engineering in 1919.

== Early life and family ==
Peabody was born in Burlington, Vermont, on August 9, 1855, to Selim Peabody and Mary Elizabeth Pangborn Peabody. He was a descendant of Francis Peabody, who had settled in Massachusetts in 1635.

Peabody's father was an educator, who held positions in Philadelphia, Wisconsin, and Chicago during Peabody's childhood. From 1871 to 1874, he was a professor of mathematics and engineering at the Massachusetts Agricultural College. His father later served as the regent (chief executive) of the University of Illinois, from 1880 to 1891.

Peabody initially attended the Massachusetts Agricultural College, but he received his bachelor of science degree in mechanical engineering (Course II) from MIT in 1877. His SB thesis is titled Link Motion.

== Career ==
Peabody's first academic appointment was as a professor of mathematics and engineering at the Sapporo Agricultural College in Japan. The college in Sapporo was new, and its curriculum was developed by a small cadre of American professors who had mainly been associated with the Massachusetts Agricultural College. During his appointment, from December 1879 to July 1881, Peabody taught mathematics, civil engineering, drafting, and astronomy; he also managed the observatory.

Starting in 1881, Peabody was an assistant professor of mechanical engineering at the University of Illinois. He joined MIT as an instructor in applied mechanics in 1883. He became an assistant professor of applied mechanics in 1884 and took the title assistant professor of steam engineering in 1885.

Peabody expanded MIT's course offerings, introducing courses in marine engineering in his first year of teaching and in naval architecture in 1891. The courses led to the establishment of the department of naval architecture in 1893. Peabody was made the first head of that department, a role he continued until his retirement.

Under Peabody's leadership, the course of naval construction engineering was established in 1901, a division of aeronautics was created in his department in 1913 (under Jerome Hunsaker), and intensive courses for naval inspectors, draftsmen, and officers were established during the World War I.

Peabody served as the chairman of the MIT faculty from 1915 to 1917. He retired in May 1920, becoming professor emeritus of naval architecture and marine engineering; he had by then been connected with MIT for 37 years.

== Technical contributions ==
In 1888, Peabody published the Tables of the Properties of Saturated Steam and Other Vapors, which appeared in eight editions by 1910. Peabody was motivated by the substantial discrepancies between then-available steam tables in English units. He constructed new tables using the data of Regnault from the 1840s together with reports by later investigators. For other vapors, he relied mainly on the work of Zeuner. Peabody continued to refine these tables; and in 1907, he added a temperature-entropy table to facilitate the adiabatic calculations used in steam turbine design. His accompanying temperature-entropy chart was soon reproduced by other textbook authors.

Peabody's throttling calorimeter.

He followed with Thermodynamics of the Steam-Engine and Other Heat-Engines in 1889, which ran through six editions by 1910. Peabody went on to write more than half-a-dozen additional textbooks.

Peabody invented the throttling calorimeter, which was extensively used to determine the quality (moisture content) of steam. He developed this device over a period of years in MIT's laboratories, finally publishing a design that he found satisfactory in 1888. The figure shows the calorimeter. Wet steam at known pressure is withdrawn through pipes a and b into a large chamber A. The steam in the chamber has a lower pressure, which is controlled by two globe valves. The lower pressure renders the steam superheated. With measurements from thermometer e and pressure gauge f, the moisture content of the sampled steam can be calculated. (Line c is a drip leg for condensate and d is the outflow from the chamber.) A modification of Peabody's design was patented by Carpenter in 1893, claiming to ensure that droplets evaporated fully without impinging on the chamber walls.

== Honors ==
Peabody was elected to the American Academy of Arts and Sciences in 1889. He joined the Society of Naval Architects and Marine Engineers when it was founded in 1893, was elected a member of its council in 1897, and was elected a vice president in 1917.

By 1916, the Emperor of Japan had conferred on Peabody the Order of the Rising Sun, 3rd Class, in recognition of the opportunities the Institute had provided to officers of the Imperial Japanese Navy and to Japanese professors and students. On June 28, 1919, the Japanese Minister of Education awarded Peabody the degree of Doctor of Engineering (工学博士, Kōgaku hakushi).

== Personal life and death ==
Peabody married Sarah Angeline Knight on June 4, 1885. By 1934, the couple resided at the Copley Plaza Hotel in Boston. Cecil died at Peter Bent Brigham Hospital on May 4, 1934. Sarah died at the Copley Plaza on February 7, 1935, survived by two sisters, a niece, and a nephew.

== Selected publications ==
- Peabody, Cecil Hobart (1888). Tables of the Properties of Saturated Steam and Other Vapors. New York: J. Wiley & Sons – via Internet Archive. (8th ed., 1909)
- ——— (August 1888). "A new calorimeter". Journal of the Franklin Institute. 126 (2): 134–137 – via Internet Archive.
- ——— (1889). Thermodynamics of the Steam-Engine and Other Heat-Engines. New York: John Wiley & Sons – via Internet Archive. (6th ed., 1910)
- ——— (1892). Valve-Gears for Steam-Engines. New York: J. Wiley – via Internet Archive.
- ———; Miller, Edward F. (1912) [First published 1897]. Steam-Boilers (3rd ed.). New York: J. Wiley & Sons – via Internet Archive.
- ——— (1900). Manual of the Steam-Engine Indicator. New York: John Wiley & Sons – via Internet Archive.
- ——— (1917) [First published 1904]. Naval Architecture (4th ed.). New York: John Wiley & Sons – via Internet Archive.
- ——— (1911). Thermodynamics of the Steam Turbine (1st ed.). New York: John Wiley & Sons – via Internet Archive.
- ——— (1912). Propellers. New York: John Wiley & Sons – via Internet Archive.
- ——— (1913). Computations for Marine Engines. New York: John Wiley & Sons – via Internet Archive.
