= Oriental Club of Philadelphia =

The Oriental Club of Philadelphia was one of the oldest continuously-active academic clubs in the United States. It was founded on April 30, 1888, with the aim of "bring[ing] together those interested in the several fields of Oriental study, for the interchange of ideas, and the encouragement of Oriental research." The club was founded by scholars and other prominent intellectuals in the Philadelphia area interested in sharing new research and archaeological findings about the cultures of South Asia, East Asia, and the Near East. Its membership was initially limited to thirty, and meetings consisted of monthly lectures, held in the houses of members.

Members in the early days of the club included some of the founding figures in American scholarship on Sanskrit, the Ancient Near East, Judaica, and the art and archaeology of Asia. Among the club's founders were Cyrus Adler, Tatsui Baba, George Dana Boardman, Stewart Culin, Morton W. Easton, Paul Haupt, Edward Washburn Hopkins, Marcus Jastrow, Morris Jastrow, Jr., Benjamin Smith Lyman, Robert W. Rogers, Mayer Sulzberger, Henry Clay Trumbull, and Talcott Williams. Other early members included William F. Albright, Robert Pierpont Blake, Rhys Carpenter, Franklin Edgerton, W. Max Müller, E. A. Speiser, and Solomon Zeitlin.

The fifth anniversary of the Oriental Club of Philadelphia was marked by the publication of a volume of studies. For the twenty-fifth anniversary of the club's foundation in 1913, it entertained the American Oriental Society. The thirty-fifth anniversary of the foundation was marked by a colloquium in 1923, the proceedings of which were published in 1924; the volume features essays by Max L. Margolis, James A. Montgomery, Walter Woodburn Hyde, Franklin Edgerton, and Theophile J. Meek. For the fiftieth anniversary of the Oriental Club of Philadelphia in 1938, the club invited the American Oriental Society to meet in Philadelphia. In 1989, under the direction of William Hanaway, the Oriental Club of Philadelphia mounted a major conference with the participation of academic clubs from around the world. The recent history of the Oriental Club of Philadelphia was the topic for discussion at the Annual Banquet on April 25, 2001, preserved in audio on the CD "An Oral History of the Oriental Club."

According to the club's website, the Oriental Club of Philadelphia "continues to be a forum for the academic exchange of ideas about the literature and languages of Asia, North Africa, and the Near and Middle East. The club brings together scholars in the Philadelphia area who work on the cultures of these regions from a variety of different perspectives, including History, Art History, Anthropology, Philosophy, and Religious Studies. Members include faculty and staff of universities and museums in the Philadelphia area. Sponsored events include presentations of works-in-progress by members, an annual lecture and banquet, and public colloquia on themes of cross-cultural concern."

The club was dissolved in Fall 2016.

== Sources ==
- S. Culin, Chinese games with dice; read before the Oriental club of Philadelphia, March 14, 1889 (Philadelphia: Franklin, 1889)
- D.G. Brinton and M. Jastrow, The cradle of the Semites: two papers read before the Philadelphia Oriental Club (Philadelphia, 1890).
- Oriental Studies: A selection of the papers read before the Oriental Club of Philadelphia, 1888-1894 (Boston: Ginn and Co., 1894), pp. 3–16.
- The Oriental Club of Philadelphia: record of 25 years (Philadelphia, 1913).
- R.G. Kent, ed., Thirty years of Oriental Studies, issued in commemoration of thirty years of activity of the Oriental Club of Philadelphia (Philadelphia, 1918).
- R. G. Kent and I. G. Matthews, "The Oriental Club of Philadelphia," Journal of the American Oriental Society 58.1 (1938), pp. 2–4.
- The Oriental Club of Philadelphia homepage
