= Selim Peabody =

American educator and mathematician (1829–1903)

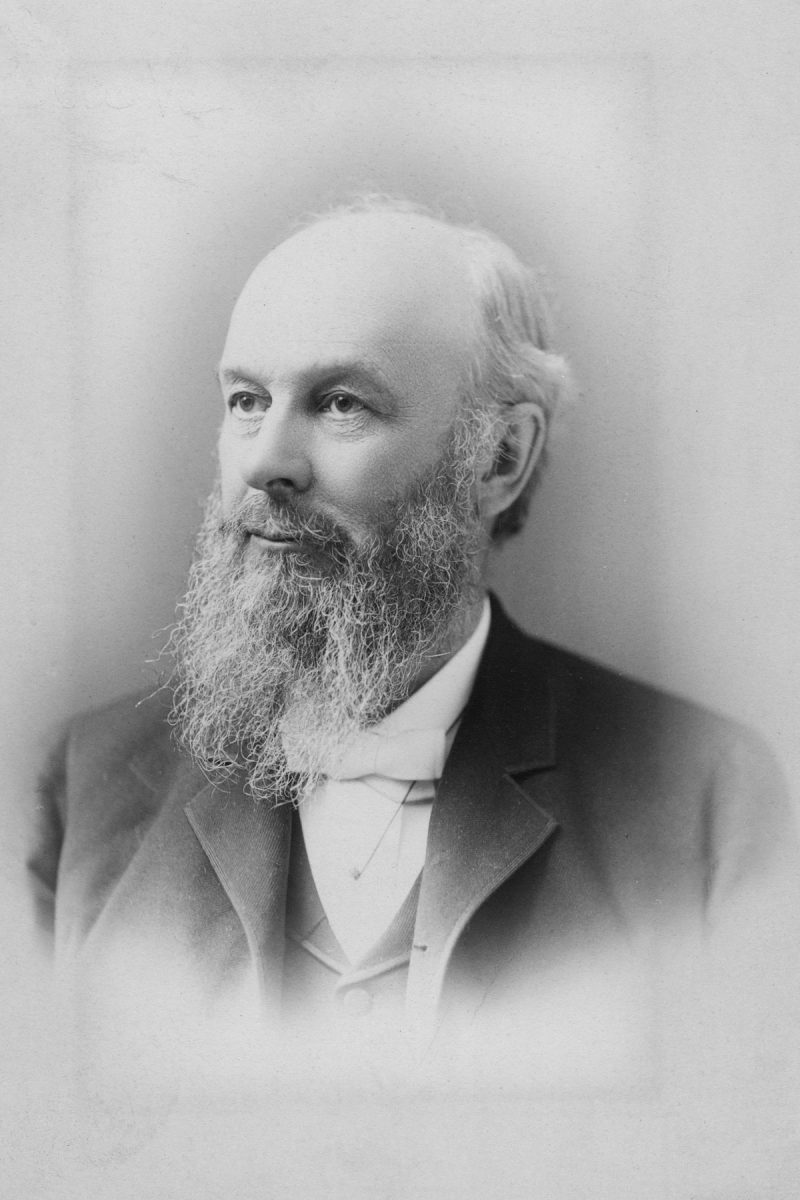
- Selim Hobart Peabody c. 1880

2nd President of the University of Illinois system
- In office 1880–1891
- Preceded by: John Milton Gregory
- Succeeded by: Thomas Jonathan Burrill

Personal details
- Born: August 20, 1829 Rockingham, Vermont, US
- Died: May 26, 1903 (aged 73) St. Louis, Missouri, US
- Children: Cecil Hobart Peabody
- Education: University of Vermont
- Profession: College administrator

Selim Hobart Peabody (August 20, 1829 – May 26, 1903) was an American educator.

== Biography ==
Selim Peabody was born in Rockingham, Vermont. He graduated at the University of Vermont in 1852, during the following years held professorships of mathematics, physics, and engineering at several colleges, and from 1880 to 1891 was president of the University of Illinois. In 1893, he was chief of the department of liberal arts at the World's Columbian Exposition, in 1899–1900 editor and statistician of the United States Commission to the Paris Exposition, and in 1900 superintendent of the division of liberal arts at the Pan-American Exposition. From 1892 to 1895, he served as president of the Chicago Academy of Sciences and from 1889 to 1891 as president of the National Council of Education. Peabody was an associate editor of the International Cyclopædia, under Editor-in-Chief Harry Thurston Peck.

He died in St. Louis on May 26, 1903.

== Selected publications ==
- Astronomy (1869)
- Juvenile Natural History (three volumes, 1869)
- New Practical Arithmetic (1872)
- American Patriotism (1880)
- Charts of Arithmetic (1900)
- Peabody Genealogy (Paybody, Pabody, Pabodie) (1909), Compiled by Selim Hobart Peabody, LL. D., Edited by Charles Henry Pope, Boston, Mass., Charles H. Pope, Publisher, Pope Building, (Advance funding by Mr. Frank Everett Peabody)
