= Otfried Nippold =

German–Swiss jurist, pacifist, academic, author and internationalist

- Born: May 21, 1864; Wiesbaden, Duchy of Nassau
- Died: July 27, 1938 (aged 74); Switzerland
- Occupations: Educator, lawyer Germany
- Known for: Contributions to international law and his participation in the creation of the League of Nations

Otfried Nippold (May 21, 1864 – July 27, 1938) was a German–Swiss jurist, pacifist and internationalist. He was also an academic and a prolific author.

Nippold was born in Wiesbaden, Duchy of Nassau, as the son of Professor Friedrich Nippold of the University of Bern and the University of Jena. He attended gymnasium in Burgdorf and in Bern and studied law at the University of Bern, University of Halle, University of Tübingen and at the University of Jena. At the Jena, he earned his doctorate in 1886.

In 1889, Nippold was invited by the Japanese government as a foreign advisor (O-yatoi gaikokujin). He taught at the Law School of the University of Tokyo.

On his return to Europe on the conclusion of his three-year contract, he worked as a lawyer in Thun and Bern and acquired Swiss citizenship in 1905. The same year, he passed his habilitation in international law at the University of Bern. After a brief stay in Frankfurt he returned to Switzerland after the outbreak of the First World War.

Following the war, he became President of the High Court of the Territory of the Saar Basin in Saarlouis in 1921. In 1927, he had become a professor of the University of Bern, and returned to Switzerland to assume his seat in 1934. He died in 1938 in Bern.

== Legal theorist ==
Nippold was one of the first to propose a league of nations. His book, Development of International Law After the World War, was drafted during the First World War. In this text, Nippold argued that the conflict created a need for a radical reinterpretation of the law of war. He reasoned that modern war cannot be given the character of a legal institution because it is really a negation of law; and therefore, war itself is an illustration of "self-help" on the part of the aggressor.

Nippold was a leader in the slow transformation of treaties from bilateral alliances or trade agreements to more "normative" instruments; and in the 20th century, there came to be a perceived distinction between regular treaties and "law-making" or "quasi-legislative" conventions. In 1894, Nippold summarized a point of view which would continue to evolve: "International treaties in their totality will be the Law-book of international law."

== Selected works ==
- 1893 – Wanderungen durch Japan. Briefe und Tagebuchblätter (Hikes through Japan. Letters and diary pages). Jena: Mauke.
- 1904 – Die Entwicklung Japans in den letzten fünfzig Jahren (The development of Japan during the last fifty years). Bern: Wys.
- 1905 – Ein Blick in das europafreie Japan (A glimpse into the Europe-free Japan). Frauenfeld: Huber.
- 1908 – Die zweite Haager Friedenskonferenz (The Second Hague Peace Conference). Leipzig, München: Duncker & Humblot.
- 1917 – Die Gestaltung des Völkerrechts nach dem Weltkriege, (The Development of International Law after the World War.)
- 1920 – Deutschland und das Völkerrecht: Vol. I, Die Grundsätze der deutschen Kriegführung; Die Verletzung der Neutralität Luxemburgs und Belgiens
