= List of University of Massachusetts Amherst residence halls =

Residential Life at the University of Massachusetts Amherst is one of the largest on-campus housing systems in the United States. Over 14,000 students live in 51 residence halls including traditional residence halls, suites, and apartments throughout campus. Residence halls range in size from 150 to 600 residents and housing is guaranteed for first year students.

Students living on the UMass campus can choose from three different types of housing, traditional Housing, suites or apartments.

== Residential areas ==
=== Northeast Residential Area ===
- Sarah L. Arnold House
- Charlotte M. Crabtree House
- Minnie E. Dwight House
- Margaret Hamlin House
- Anna M. Johnson House
- Helen Knowlton House
- Lottie A. Leach House
- Edward M. Lewis House
- Mary M. Lyon House
- Roscoe W. Thatcher House

=== Central Residential Area ===
- Hugh P. Baker House
- Alden C. Brett House
- William P. Brooks House
- Kenyon L. Butterfield House
- Paul A. Chadbourne House
- James C. Greenough House
- Edwin D. Gorman House
- Ralph A. Van Meter House
- William Wheeler House

=== Orchard Hill Residential Area ===
- Emily E. Dickinson House
- Eugene Field House
- David Grayson House
- Noah Webster House

=== Southwest Residential Area ===
- Alexander E. Cance House
- Calvin Coolidge Tower
- Guy C. Crampton House
- Ralph Waldo Emerson House
- Clark H. James House
- John Adams Tower
- John Quincy Adams Tower
- John F. Kennedy Tower
- Anderson A. MacKimmie House
- Herman Melville House
- Franklin Moore House
- Charles H. Patterson House
- Mildred Pierpont House
- Walter E. Prince House
- Henry David Thoreau House
- George Washington Tower

=== Sylvan Residential Area ===
- Henry D. Brown House
- William M. Cashin House
- Elizabeth McNamara House

=== Commonwealth Honors College Residential Community ===
- Birch Hall
- Elm Hall
- Linden Hall
- Maple Hall
- Oak Hall
- Sycamore Hall

=== North Apartments ===
- North Residential Building A
- North Residential Building B
- North Residential Building C
- North Residential Building D
