= Johannes Ludwig Janson =

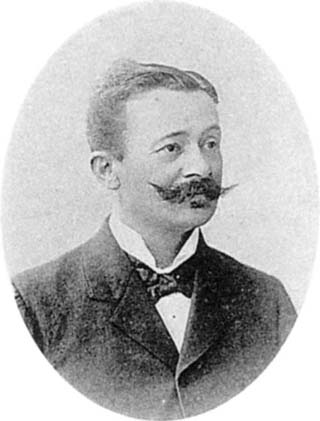
- Born: 1 September 1849
- Died: 28 October 1914 (aged 65); Kagoshima, Japan
- Occupation: educator
- Known for: Foreign advisor to Meiji Japan

Johannes Ludwig Janson (1 September 1849 – 28 October 1914) was a German specialist in veterinary science. He is noted for having introduced western veterinary science to Meiji period Japan in the late 19th century.

== Biography ==
Janson was hired by the Meiji government of Japan as a foreign advisor and arrived in Tokyo in October 1880. He taught at the Veterinary School in Komaba. During his tenure, the school in Komaba was merged into the School of Agriculture of Tokyo Imperial University. Janson's contract was extended several times, and he continued teaching at Komaba 1902. Many of his students went on to occupy important positions within the Japanese government.

Janson wrote a number of scientific papers on the domestic animals and veterinary medicine practices in Japan

Janson married a Japanese woman, and his grave is in Kagoshima, the native place of his wife.
