= William Wheeler House (Amherst, Massachusetts) =

Building in Massachusetts, United States

Coordinates: 42°23′20.05″N 72°31′16.68″W

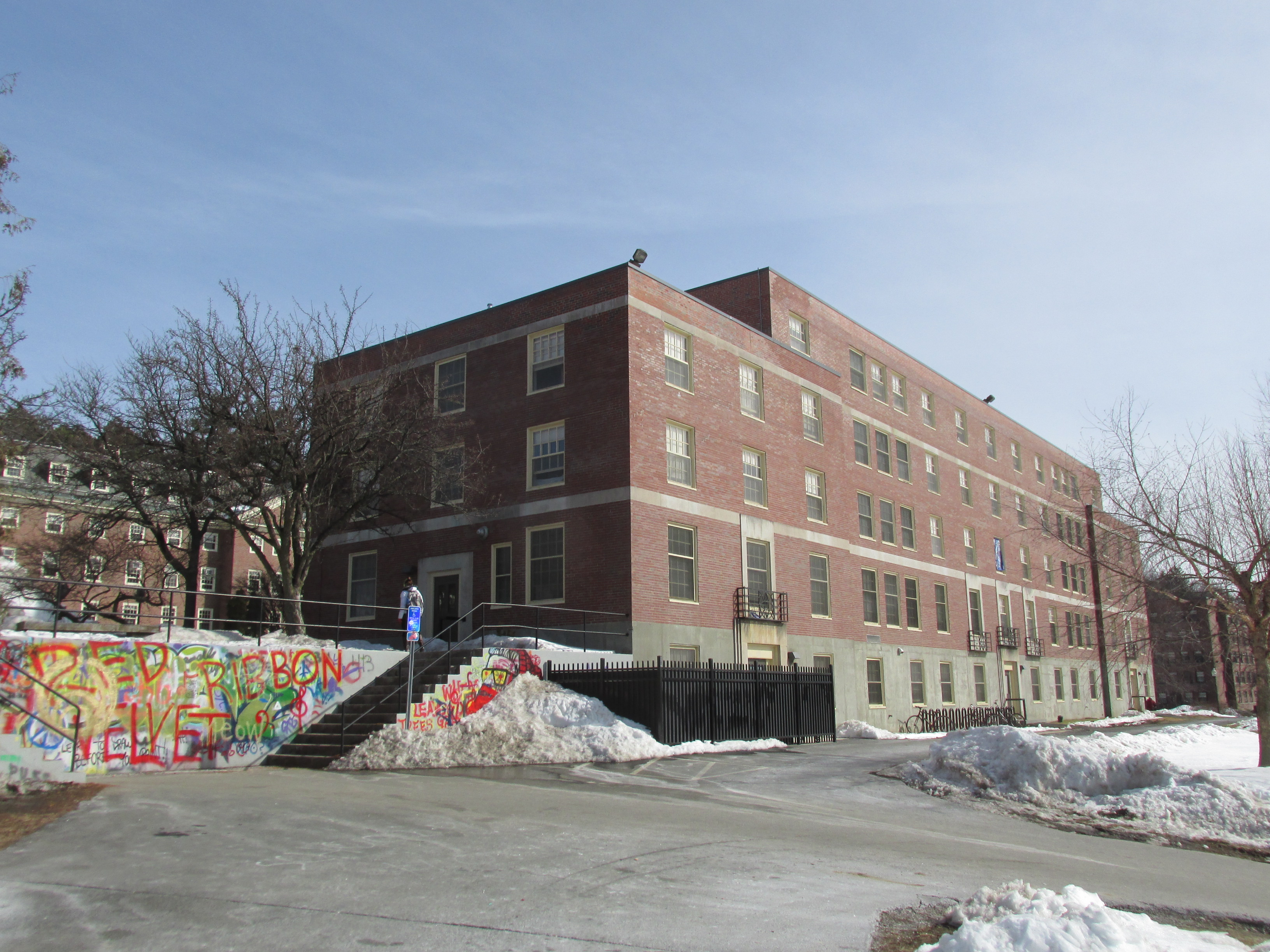
Wheeler House in 2014

The William Wheeler House, also known as Wheeler Hall, is a dormitory in the Central Residential Area of the University of Massachusetts Amherst. Designed by Louis Ross, who designed many of the other dormitories on campus as well as the university's Student Union, the Wheeler House was built in the Georgian revival style with art deco accents.

It is named after one of the university's first students William Wheeler, noted for his teaching and engineering work both in the United States and in Sapporo, Japan.
