= Foreign government advisors in Meiji Japan =

Modernisation between 1868 and 1912

The foreign employees in Meiji Japan, known in Japanese as O-yatoi Gaikokujin (Kyūjitai: 御雇い外國人, Shinjitai: 御雇い外国人, 'hired foreigners'), were hired by the Japanese government and municipalities for their specialized knowledge and skill to assist in the modernization of the Meiji period. The term came from Yatoi (a person hired temporarily, a day laborer), was politely applied for hired foreigner as O-yatoi gaikokujin.

The total number is over 2,000, probably reaches 3,000 (with thousands more in the private sector). Until 1899, more than 800 hired foreign experts continued to be employed by the government, and many others were employed privately. Their occupation varied, ranging from high salaried government advisors, college professors and instructor, to ordinary salaried technicians.

Along the process of the opening of the country, the Tokugawa Shogunate government first hired German diplomat Philipp Franz von Siebold as diplomatic advisor, Dutch naval engineer Hendrik Hardes for Nagasaki Arsenal and Willem Johan Cornelis, Ridder Huijssen van Kattendijke for Nagasaki Naval Training Center, French naval engineer François Léonce Verny for Yokosuka Naval Arsenal, and British civil engineer Richard Henry Brunton. Most of the O-yatoi were appointed through government approval with two or three years contract, and took their responsibility properly in Japan, except in some cases.

As the Public Works hired almost 40% of the total number of the O-yatois, the main goal in hiring the O-yatois was to obtain transfers of technology and advice on systems and cultural ways. Therefore, young Japanese officers gradually took over the post of the O-yatoi after they completed training and education at the Imperial College, Tokyo, the Imperial College of Engineering or studying abroad.

The O-yatois were highly paid; in 1874, they numbered 520 men, at which time their salaries came to ¥2.272 million, or 33.7 percent of the national annual budget.

Despite the value they provided in the modernization of Japan, the Japanese government did not consider it prudent for them to settle in Japan permanently. After the contract terminated, most of them returned to their country except some, like Josiah Conder and William Kinninmond Burton.

The system was officially terminated in 1899 when extraterritoriality came to an end in Japan. Nevertheless, similar employment of foreigners persists in Japan, particularly within the national education system and professional sports.

== Notable O-yatoi gaikokujin ==
=== Agriculture ===
- (German Empire) Louis Boehmer
- (United States) William P. Brooks, agronomist
- (United States) William Smith Clark
- (United States) Edwin Dun
- (German Empire) Max Fesca
- (German Empire) Oskar Kellner
- (German Empire) Oskar Löw, agronomist

=== Medical science ===
- (German Empire) Erwin Bälz
- (German Empire) Johannes Ludwig Janson
- (German Empire) Heinrich Botho Scheube
- (German Empire) Julius Scriba

=== Law, administration, and economics ===
- (France) Georges Appert, legal scholar
- (France) Gustave Emile Boissonade, legal scholar
- (France) Georges Hilaire Bousquet, legal scholar
- (United States) Henry Willard Denison, diplomat
- (United Kingdom) Horatio Nelson Lay, railway developer
- (German Empire) Georg Michaelis, jurist
- (German Empire) Albert Mosse, jurist
- (German Empire) (Switzerland) Otfried Nippold, jurist
- (German Empire) Karl Rathgen, economist
- (German Empire) Hermann Roesler, jurist and economist
- (United Kingdom) Alexander Allan Shand, monetary
- (German Empire) Heinrich Waentig, economist and jurist

=== Military ===
- (France) Louis-Émile Bertin, naval engineer, constructor of the Kure and Sasebo Naval Arsenals
- (France) Jules Brunet, artillery officer
- (United States) Douglas R. Cassel, naval instructor
- (United Kingdom) Archibald Lucius Douglas, naval instructor
- (United States) Henry Walton Grinnell, Navy instructor
- (German Empire) Carl Köppen, Army instructor
- (German Empire) Klemens Wilhelm Jakob Meckel, Army instructor
- (United Kingdom) Henry Spencer Palmer, military engineer
- (France) Léonce Verny, constructor of the Yokosuka Naval Arsenal
- (United States) James R. Wasson, civil engineer and teacher, army engineer
- (United Kingdom) Charles Dickinson West, naval architect

=== Natural science and mathematics ===
- (United Kingdom) William Edward Ayrton, physicist
- (United Kingdom) Edward Divers, chemist
- (United Kingdom) Sir James Alfred Ewing, physicist and engineer who founded Japanese seismology
- (United Kingdom) Cargill Gilston Knott, succeeding J.A. Ewing
- (United States) Benjamin Smith Lyman, mining engineer
- (United States) Thomas Corwin Mendenhall, physicist
- (United States) Edward S. Morse, zoologist
- (German Empire) Heinrich Edmund Naumann, geologist
- (German Empire) Curt Netto, metallurgist
- (United States) Charles Otis Whitman, zoologist, successor of Edward S. Morse

=== Engineering ===
- (German Empire) Wilhelm Böckmann, architect
- (United Kingdom) (France) Charles Alfred Chastel de Boinville, architect
- (United States) William P. Brooks, agriculture
- (United Kingdom) Richard Henry Brunton, builder of lighthouses
- (United Kingdom) William Kinnimond Burton, engineering, architecture, photography
- (France) Jean Francisque Coignet, mining engineer
- (United States) Horace Capron, agriculture, road construction
- (United Kingdom) Josiah Conder, architect
- (United Kingdom) Henry Dyer, engineering education
- (Netherlands) Cornelis Johannes van Doorn, civil engineer, port development and river improvements
- (German Empire) Hermann Ende, architect
- (Netherlands) George Arnold Escher, civil engineer
- (United Kingdom) William Gowland, mining engineer, archaeologist
- (United Kingdom) Colin Alexander McVean, civil engineer
- (United Kingdom) John Milne, geologist, seismologist
- (United Kingdom) Edmund Morel, civil engineer
- (Netherlands) Anthonie Rouwenhorst Mulder, civil engineer, rivers and ports
- (Switzerland) François Perregaux, mechanical watchmaker
- (Netherlands) Johannis de Rijke, civil engineer, flood control, river projects
- (United Kingdom) Henry Scharbau, cartographer
- (United States) John Alexander Low Waddell, bridge engineer
- (United Kingdom) Thomas James Waters, civil engineer
- (Switzerland) (Italy) Albert Favre Zanuti, mechanical watchmaker

=== Art and music ===
- (Italy) Edoardo Chiossone, engraver
- (Austria-Hungary) Rudolf Dittrich, musician
- (German Empire) Franz Eckert, musician
- (United States) Ernest Fenollosa, art critic
- (United Kingdom) John William Fenton, musician
- (Italy) Antonio Fontanesi, oil painter
- (United States) Luther Whiting Mason, musician
- (Italy) Vincenzo Ragusa, sculptor

=== Liberal arts, humanities and education ===
- (United States) Alice Mabel Bacon, pedagogue
- (United Kingdom) Basil Hall Chamberlain, Japanologist and professor of Japanese
- (United Kingdom) Edward Bramwell Clarke, educator
- (United Kingdom) Lafcadio Hearn, Japanologist
- (German Empire) Viktor Holtz, educator
- (United States) Leroy Lansing Janes, educator, missionary
- (Russian Empire) (German Empire) Raphael von Koeber, philosopher and musician
- (United States) Marion McCarrell Scott, educator
- (United States) David Murray, educator
- (German Empire) Ludwig Riess, historian
- (United Kingdom) James Summers, English literature

=== Missionary activities ===
- (United States) William Elliot Griffis, clergyman, author
- (Netherlands) Guido Verbeck, missionary, pedagogue
- (United States) Horace Wilson, missionary and teacher credited with introducing baseball to Japan

=== Others ===
- (United Kingdom) Francis Brinkley, journalist
- (German Empire) Ottmar von Mohl, court protocol

== See also ==
- Foreign cemeteries in Japan
- Foreign relations of Japan
  - France–Japan relations
    - France–Japan relations (19th century)
  - Germany–Japan relations
  - Italy–Japan relations
  - Japan–Portugal relations
  - Japan–Netherlands relations
  - Japan–United Kingdom relations
  - Japan–United States relations
  - Spain–Japan relations
- Meiji era
