= William P. Brooks House =

Building in Amherst, Massachusetts

Coordinates: 42°23′23.66″N 72°31′15.61″W

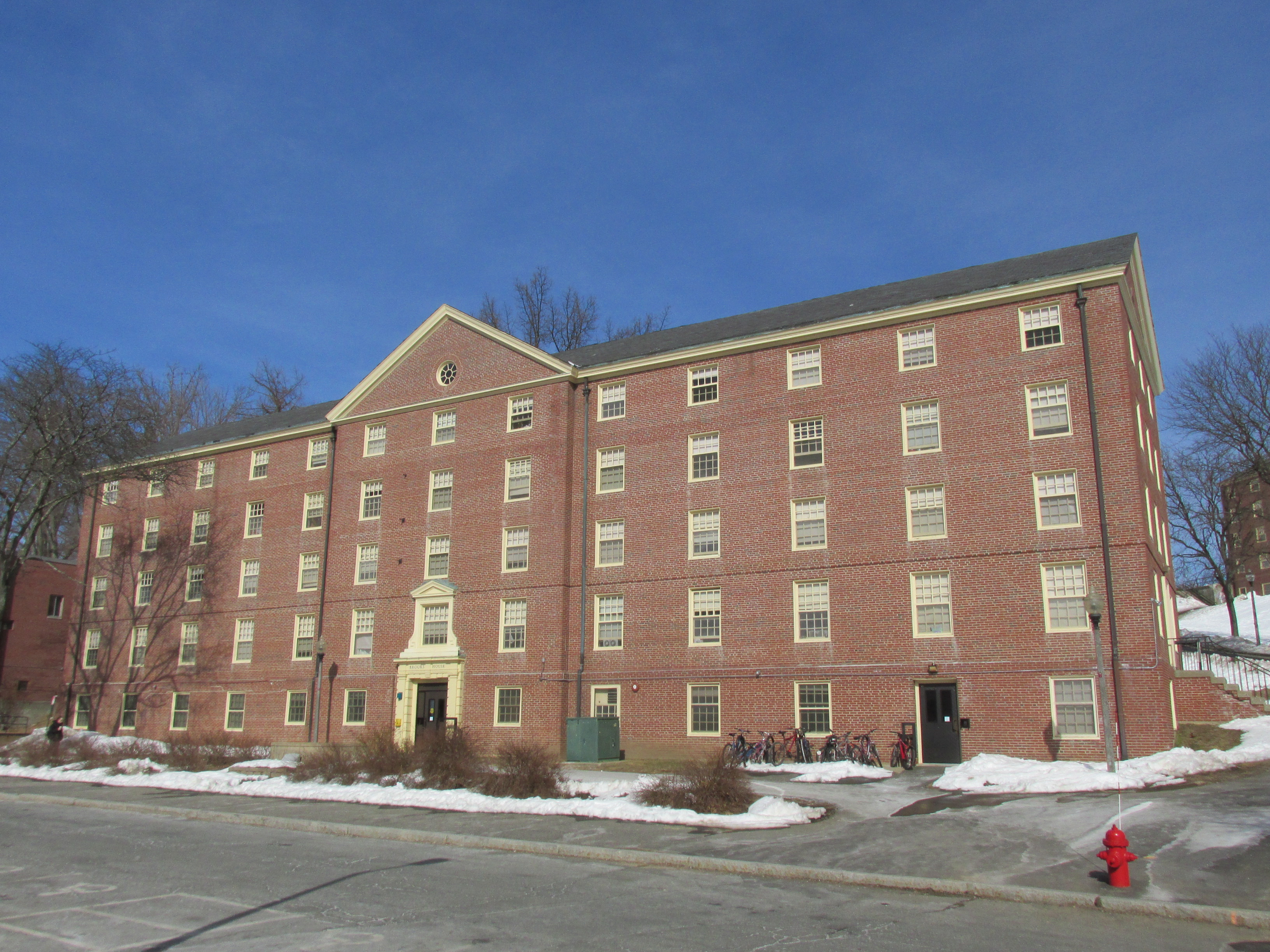
Brooks House in 2014

The William P. Brooks House, also known as Brooks Hall, is a dormitory in Amherst, Massachusetts that is built in the georgian revival style with art deco accents. It is named after former professor and president of Massachusetts Agricultural College, William P. Brooks. It is part of the Central Residential Area at the University of Massachusetts Amherst. Brooks Hall was dedicated in 1948.

It was designed by Louis W. Ross, who designed many of the dormitories on campus as well as the Student Union. In addition to his academic and administrative career, Brooks is credited as one of six Founders of Phi Sigma Kappa fraternity in 1873 at Massachusetts Agricultural College.
