= Edwin Dun =

American agricultural consultant, rancher and diplomat

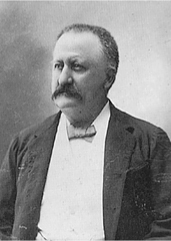
- Portrait of Dun

United States Minister to Japan
- In office July 14, 1893 – July 2, 1897
- President: Grover Cleveland; William McKinley
- Preceded by: Frank Coombs
- Succeeded by: Alfred Eliab Buck

Personal details
- Born: June 19, 1848 Chillicothe, Ohio, United States
- Died: May 15, 1931 (aged 82) Tokyo, Japan
- Relatives: Thomas Blakiston (brother-in-law); Josh Dun (great-great-great-grandson)
- Occupation: Agricultural consultant, rancher, diplomat

Edwin Dun (June 19, 1848 – May 15, 1931) was a rancher from Ohio who was employed as an o-yatoi gaikokujin in Hokkaidō by the Hokkaidō Development Commission (Kaitakushi) and advised the Japanese government on modernizing agricultural techniques during the Meiji modernization period. He served as United States envoy to Japan from 1893 to 1897.

Dun was a native of Chillicothe, Ohio and had studied at Miami University. After he inherited his father's ranch, he raised beef cattle and race horses, and wrote a number of papers on scientific methods in ranching.

== Agricultural adviser ==
Dun was hired in 1873 by Albert Capron, son of former United States Commissioner of Agriculture Horace Capron, the chief foreign adviser to the Meiji government's Hokkaidō Development Commission. Dun's task was to create a new cattle and dairy industry out of the largely undeveloped and newly colonized island of Hokkaido. When he came to Japan, he brought with him around 50 head of cattle, 100 head of sheep, and a number of agricultural implements to be used as samples to be copied by local Japanese artisans. He settled initially at an intermediary experimental farm in Tokyo, teaching up to seventy students assigned by the government in animal husbandry, veterinary medicine and basic techniques of selective breeding. Dun also married a Japanese woman, Tsuru, in 1875, which led him to extend his contract in Japan several times, despite difficulties such as the Hokkaidō Development Commission Scandal of 1881 (ja).

From 1876 until 1883, Dun lived in Sapporo, where he engaged in a number of pursuits, such as the establishment of farm horse and race horse ranches, including the first two thoroughbred stallions in Japan, a pig farm with 80 hogs brought in from the United States, and a dairy farm, together with factories for the production of butter and cheese. He also planted a number of experimental lots to research the types of crops most suited to Hokkaido's climate, and also built Hokkaido's first horse race track. With the assistance of Louis Boehmer, who discovered native hops in Hokkaidō, he established a successful beer brewery, the forerunner of modern Sapporo Breweries. Dun is also deemed responsible for initiating government policies to eradicate wolves with strychnine and hunting for bounties, which drove the Hokkaido wolf to extinction by 1895. He was a close friend, and eventually brother-in-law, of the explorer and naturalist Thomas Blakiston.

== United States envoy to Japan ==
After a visit to the United States in 1883–84, Dun was appointed the Second Secretary of the American Legation in Tokyo. In October 1883, Dun's wife, Tsuru, died. Dun considered resigning but at the end of the year married again, to a woman named Yama Takahira. Dun was later promoted to First Secretary. Finally, in 1892, Dun was appointed as United States envoy to Japan, arriving back in Tokyo on July 14, 1893, serving in that post until July 2, 1897. During his tenure, the First Sino-Japanese War took place, and Dun made efforts to negotiate peace, using the American diplomatic service as a conduit for the Japanese and Chinese governments to send messages and conduct negotiations.

== Oil company representative ==
After 1897, Dun was the Japanese representative of the Standard Oil company. Dun was notable for advocating involvement of Standard Oil in the Echigo oil fields, which eventually resulted in a failed investment of over 8 million yen. He died at his home in Tokyo in 1931. His grave is at Aoyama Cemetery in Tokyo. His former home in Hokkaidō is now preserved as a memorial museum.
