= Georges Appert =

French historian and japanologist (1850–1934)

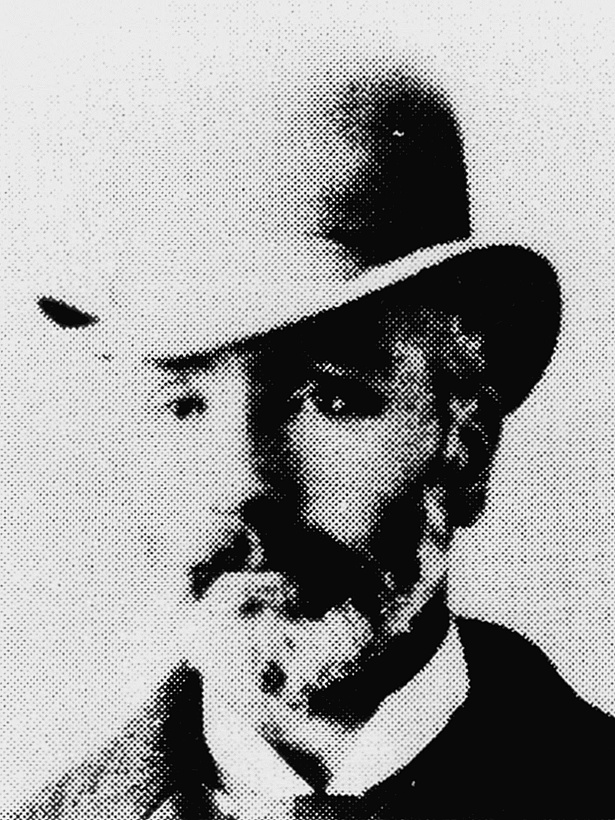
- Born: 1850
- Died: 1934 (aged 83–84)
- Occupations: Historian, academic, writer, Japanologist

Georges Appert (1850–1934) was a French historian, academic, writer and Japanologist. He was a legal scholar and professor of law at the University of Tokyo.

== Career ==
Appert was a foreign government advisor in Meiji Japan from 1879 to 1889.

== Select works ==
In an overview of writings by and about Appert, OCLC/WorldCat lists roughly 26 works in 43 publications in 5 languages and 132 library holdings.

- Ancien Japon, 1888
- Du terme en droit romain et en droit français, 1876
- Dictionnaire des termes de droit, d'économie politique et d'administration, 1885
- 日本立法資料全集 (Japanese legislation Complete Works). 別卷 337, 佛國相續法講義, 2005
- Un code de la féodalité Japonaise au XIIIe siècle, 1900
- 理財学講義 (Lecture notes in chrematistics), 1884
- 経済学講義 (Economics lecture), 1883
