= Sapporo Agricultural College =

Former school in Sapporo, Japan

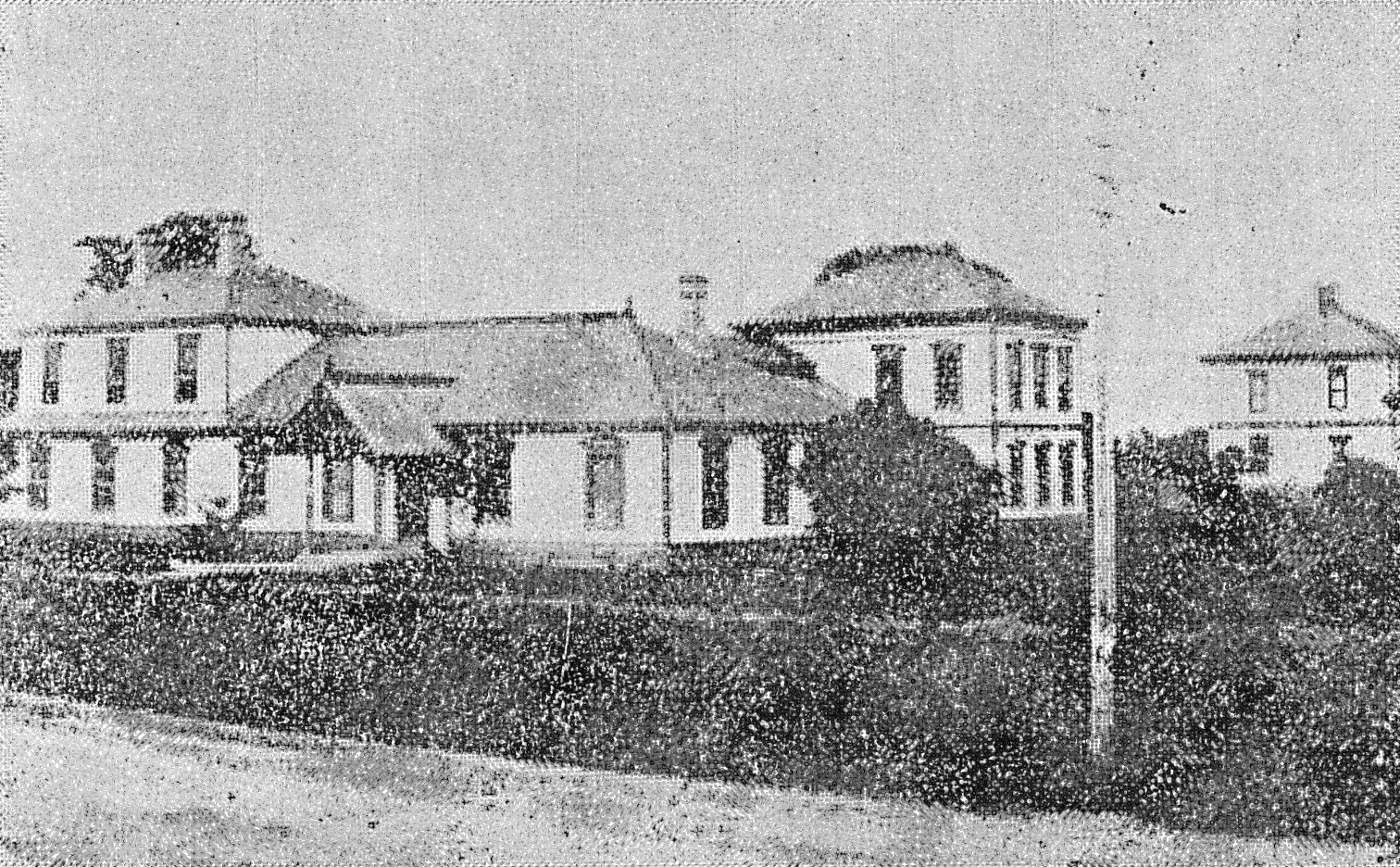
The school's main building in 1880

Sapporo Agricultural College (札幌農学校, Sapporo nōgakkō) was a school in Sapporo, Hokkaidō established in September 1875 for the purpose of educating students in the agriculture industry.

== History ==
The first president of the college was Zusho Hirotake.

Dr. William S. Clark, a graduate of Amherst College and the president of the Massachusetts Agricultural College (MAC) was appointed as the vice president of the college. Clark taught in Sapporo only eight months but left a deep impact on the students. Specifically, his parting words, "Boys, be ambitious," have become among the most famous phrases in Japan. He was accompanied by three other MAC alumni, David P. Penhallow, William Penn Brooks and William Wheeler. Cecil Peabody was a professor of mathematics (circa 1878 to 1882).

The college is well known in Japan as a successful Japanese-English immersion school, which produced many good English speakers and writers. The early graduates, especially Classes 1880–1885, played a directional role in modernizing Japan.

In September 1907, it became the College of Agriculture under Tohoku Imperial University in Sendai.

In April 1918, the Hokkaido Imperial University was established, and Sapporo Agricultural College was transferred to it.

Hokkaido Imperial University was renamed Hokkaido University in December 1947, a name it retains to this day, and Sapporo Agricultural College became its Faculty of Agriculture.
