= Joseph Francis Barrett =

Fraternity founder (1854–1918)

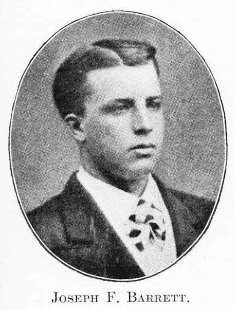
- "Big Chief" Barrett
- Born: October 7, 1854; Barre, Massachusetts, United States
- Died: January 23, 1918 (aged 63); Manhattan, New York, United States
- Education: Massachusetts Agricultural College (UMass)
- Employer: William H. Bowker Fertilizer Co.

Joseph Francis Barrett (1854–1918) was an American agricultural supply company executive who was a long-time alumnus leader of Phi Sigma Kappa fraternity, which he co-founded with five others in 1873.

== Early life ==
Joseph Francis Barrett, commonly known as Frank and later almost exclusively as Joe, was a descendant of the English Barretts who settled in Chelmsford, Massachusetts about 1635. The Fraternity now states his middle name was Francis, although earlier generations of Phi Sigs were taught that it was Franklin. He was born on 7 October 1854 in Barre, Massachusetts at the family farm, the eldest son of William R. and Sarah A. Barrett. Dr. Root, his boyhood friend, and later, a fellow Phi Sig, recalled Barrett's mother as a "most brilliant, witty and charming woman" (p. 17), socially engaging and thought to be a source of Barrett's own charm. Barrett was educated at Barre High School and Leicester Academy, where he was a standout student. With an impressive mind among his peers, he entered college at Massachusetts Agricultural College, "Aggie," as a sophomore at age seventeen, where he continued to excel. Barrett graduated as the third ranking student in 1875, his senior year, placing behind two other Phi Sigs.

== Collegiate activities ==
Much of Barrett's impact was due to the collegiate activities that indeed defined his life.

While at Aggie, Barrett was a member of the Washington Irving Literary Society, a popular pastime among the undergraduates. He was a member of the Gymnastic Association, held the military rank of lieutenant in the College's Battalion, and was an editor of the 1875 version of the college yearbook. His peers honored Barrett by election as president and toastmaster of the class. Yet among all these, it was his role as a Founder of Phi Sigma Kappa fraternity in his Sophomore year by which he is best remembered today.

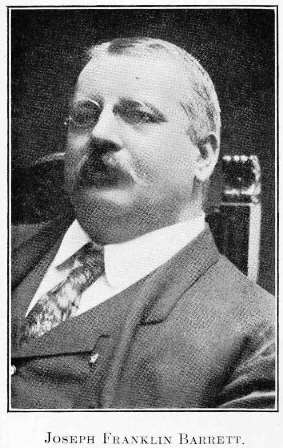
Joseph F. Barrett, Jan 1910 Signet, taken at 50 years old. (In original caption, middle name is incorrect)

== Later years ==
Upon graduation, Barrett engaged professionally with the William H. Bowker Fertilizer Co., where he built a successful career.

With age, Barrett grew increasingly urbane and diplomatic, providing "his famous soothing syrups and knock-out drops" (p. 68) - diplomatic advice - when discussion got heated. He was elected to form the Grand Chapter of Phi Sigma Kappa in 1878, and presided over many alumni meetings and conventions for the first four decades of the Society. He was elected president of the Grand Chapter (national governing body) of Phi Sigma Kappa nine times during the period between 1881 and 1893, served as Chancellor of the Fraternity's Court of Honor, and in several other roles. Indeed, of all the Founders, it was Barrett who stayed closest to the Fraternity for many years, supporting expansion and organization while actively engaged as president of his company.

In response to their affection of the man, undergraduates nicknamed him "The Big Chief," after his attempt to settle a particularly rambunctious annual convention in 1904.

Barrett spoke at the corner stone laying ceremony for his Alpha chapter's new building on June 15, 1914.

Barrett died at the age of 63 on January 23, 1918.
