= Powers Institute Historic District =

Historic district in Massachusetts, United States

- U.S. National Register of Historic Places
- U.S. Historic district
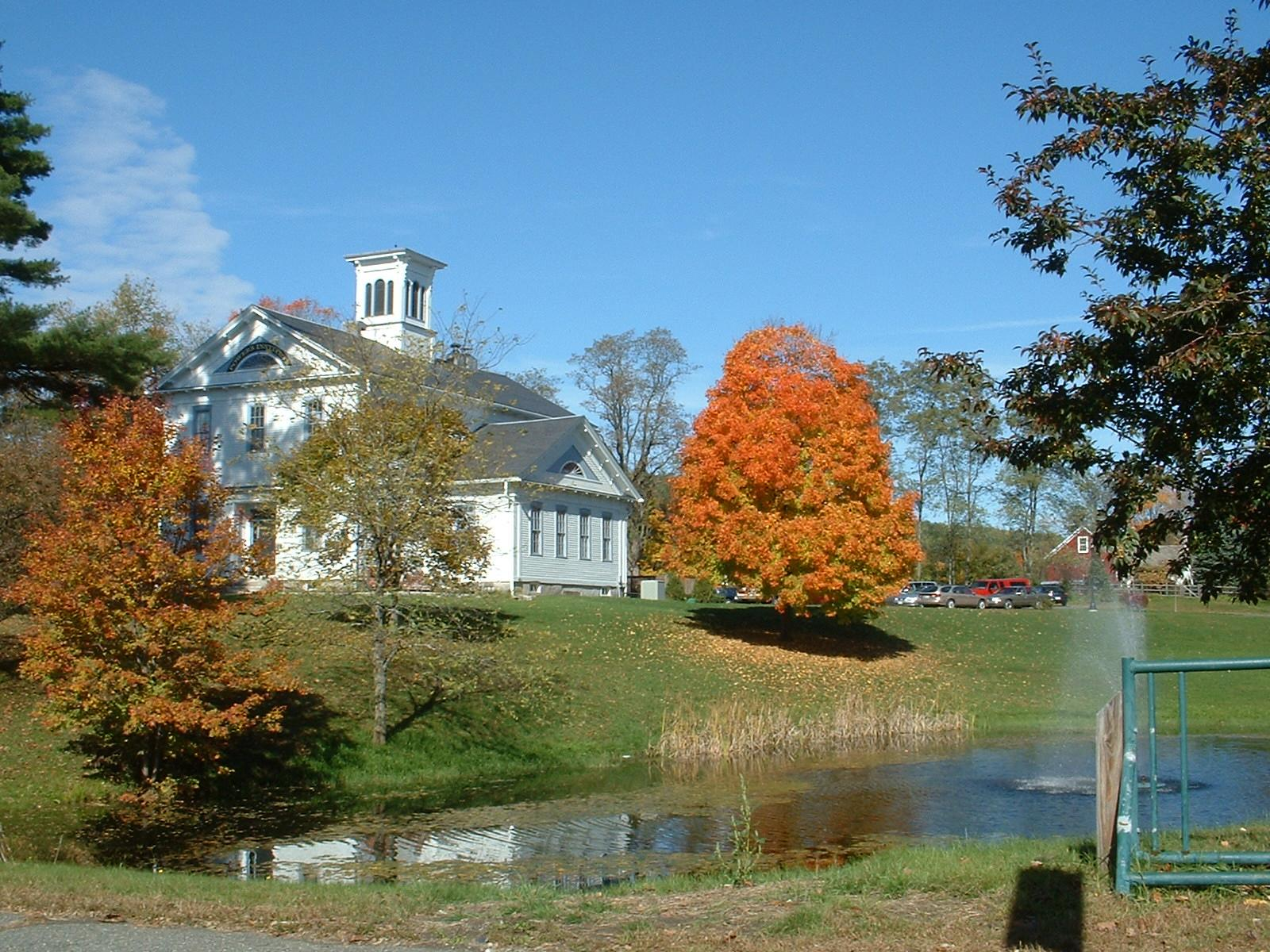
- Powers Institute

- Location within Massachusetts Location within the United States
- Location: Bernardston, Massachusetts
- Coordinates: 42°40′16″N 72°33′12″W
- Built: 1860
- Architect: Woodcock, Virgil
- Architectural style: Italianate
- NRHP reference No.: 93000127
- Added to NRHP: March 18, 1994

The Powers Institute Historic District is a historic district encompassing a distinctive portion of the town of Bernardston, Massachusetts. It encompasses two parcels of land, one on each side of Church Street between South and Library Streets, totalling 6.5 acres (2.6 ha). The district was listed on the National Register of Historic Places in 1994.

There are four buildings on these parcels, the most notable of which is the Italianate Powers Institute building. Its construction was funded by a bequest from Bernardston native Edward Eppes Powers (1793-1855), and it was built in 1857 on land donated by a number of local residents. The building was intended to serve the town's secondary school needs, but its reach expanded with the construction in 1860 of Cushman Hall, a dormitory located across the street. Land and funds for its construction came from Henry Cushman, a local resident who served as atrustee of the Powers bequest, and played a role in the institute's administration. Thereafter the school also took in students from further afield. Cushman in 1862 also funded the construction of the Cushman Library, which was built next to the institute.

Upon the death of Henry Cushman, Cushman Hall was willed to the town, with the provision that income from its use go toward a park on the adjacent land. He also endowed the library, which was one of the first to be built in the area. Cushman's gift was expanded upon in 1900, when the family of John Sanderson donated funds to expand the library building, adding a second floor.

The Power Institute remained a successful public-private academy until 1891, at which point it was transitioned to operate as a more conventional secondary high school for area residents. Cushman Hall ceased to be used as a dormitory, and was converted into apartments. In 1958 the school was closed, and has since been converted for use by the Bernardston Historical Society. The district includes one non-contributing property: a fire station was built on the institute parcels in 1975.

== See also ==
- National Register of Historic Places listings in Franklin County, Massachusetts
