= William P. Brooks =

American agricultural scientist

William Penn Brooks
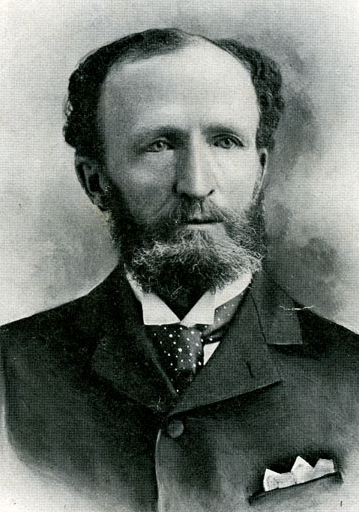
- William P. Brooks, circa 1905.

President of the Sapporo Agricultural College (now Hokkaido University)
- In office 1880–1883, 1886 – 1887

President of the Massachusetts Agricultural College (now the University of Massachusetts Amherst)
- In office 1905–1906

Personal details
- Born: November 19, 1851 Scituate, Massachusetts, U.S.
- Died: March 8, 1938 (aged 86) Amherst, Massachusetts, U.S.
- Spouse(s): Eva Bancroft Hall (1882-1924); Grace L. Holden (1927-1938)
- Education: Massachusetts Agricultural College
- Occupation: Agronomist, botanist, professor of agriculture

William Penn Brooks (November 19, 1851 – March 8, 1938) was an American agricultural scientist, who worked as a foreign advisor in Meiji era Japan during the colonization project for Hokkaidō. He was the eighth president of the Massachusetts Agricultural College. Brooks is remembered as one of six Founders of Phi Sigma Kappa fraternity in 1873.

== Biography ==
=== Early life ===
Brooks was born in South Scituate, Massachusetts, United States to Nathaniel Brooks and Rebecca Partridge (Cushing), the tenth of a family of eleven children, and born when his father was well past fifty. His father's ancestors came to North America in 1635, and his mother's belonged to the Cushings of England. He had studied in the public schools, at Assinippi Institute and at the Hanover Academy. He taught school in Hanover and Rockland, then entered college at the beginning of the third term of his freshman year.

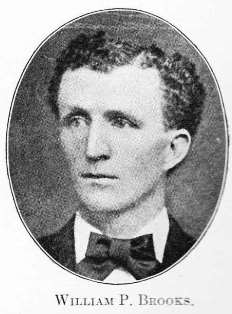
William Penn Brooks at his graduation in 1875

=== Collegiate activities ===
Brooks' collegiate activities are notable because of his role in founding Phi Sigma Kappa fraternity along with five fellow students.

While at "Aggie," Brooks was a member of the Washington Irving Literary Society, a popular pastime among the undergraduates. He was a member of the Gymnastic Association, held the military rank of captain in the College's Battalion, and was an editor of the 1875 version of the college yearbook. His peers honored Brooks by election as permanent historian of the class. He was valedictorian of the Massachusetts Agricultural College class of 1875, where he had specialized in agricultural chemistry. Yet among all these, it was his role as a Founder of Phi Sigma Kappa fraternity in his Sophomore year by which his name is best remembered today.

=== Early career in Japan ===
After a year of graduate study, Brooks was hired as a teacher for Sapporo Agricultural College (SAC), in Japan, whose head teacher at that time was Brooks' former professor, William Smith Clark. Brooks arrived in Sapporo in January 1877, shortly before Clark left the school and only a few months before the Japanese government crushed the Satsuma rebellion, the last opposition to its policy of modernization.

Immediately after his arrival, he began to deliver lectures on agricultural science and took charge of the directorship of the experimental fields. Brooks worked at the Sapporo Agricultural School for twelve years, four of which he served as the college president.

Along with his teaching, Brooks made a great number of contributions as an agricultural advisor, identifying profitable crops for the northern Japanese climate and teaching courses in botany and agricultural science. He is credited with the introduction of onions, corn, beans, forage and other plants to Hokkaidō.

Brooks stressed both the theoretical and practical in his classes. Students were assigned six hours of field work a week and paid by the hour. Brooks also contributed much to the English education. He conducted the three kinds of English classes, "English" including "Composition" and "Elocution," "Debate," and "Declamation" from 1877 to 1886. His instruction, with diligence and leadership, was intended to qualify students to write and speak English correctly and effectively; focused on the essential points, less encumbered with irrelevant matter; and improved students greatly, giving both more ability and confidence in the expression of ideas.

In 1882, Brooks traveled home on leave and married. His wife, Eva Bancroft Hall Brooks went after him to live in Sapporo until his contract expired in 1888. During this time they had two children, Rachel Bancroft Brooks and Sumner Cushing Brooks (also to become a Phi Sig, Alpha, 1910), who later married noted American biologist Matilda Moldenhauer Brooks.

=== Back to Amherst, by way of Germany ===
Brooks returned to the United States in October 1888 after having received the Order of the Rising Sun (4th class) from Emperor Meiji, and accepted a position at Massachusetts Agricultural College as a lecturer, and for two years, as president (1905–06). Brooks continued graduate study at the University of Halle in Germany, where he earned his doctorate. Continuing as a lecturer at Massachusetts Agricultural, he became the director of the Massachusetts Agricultural Experiment Station until his retirement in 1921, where he is remembered for introducing Japanese cultivars, including several Japanese varieties of soybean and millet.

In 1920, Brooks received an honorary doctorate from the Minister of Education in Japan.

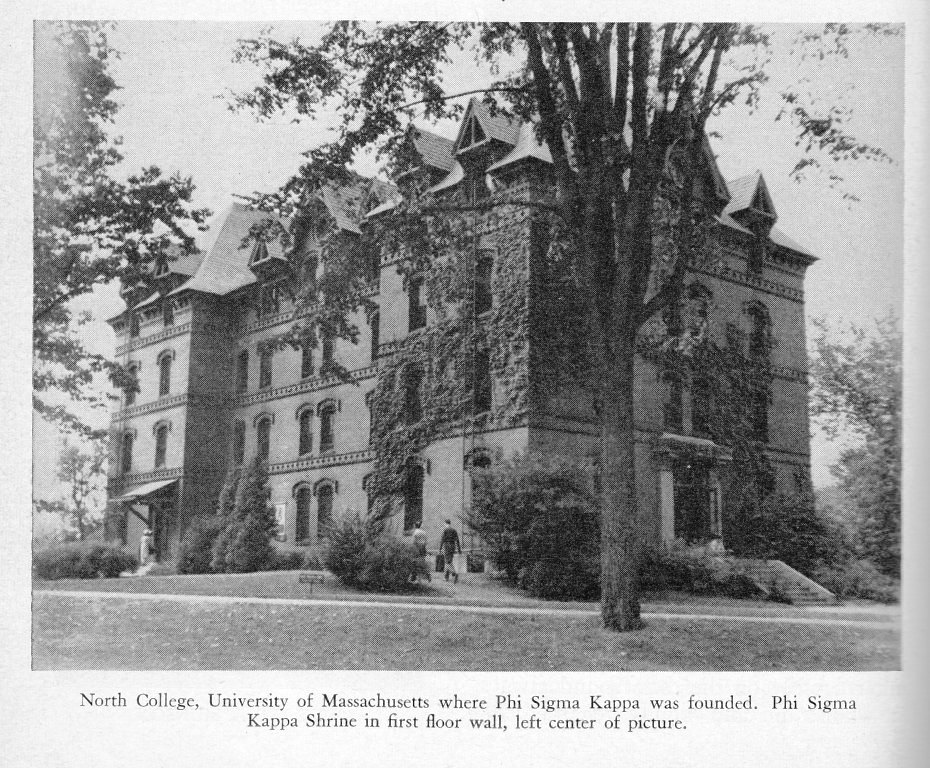
Old North Hall, site of ΦΣΚ's founding in 1873, at the University of Massachusetts Amherst. "The Shrine," a memorial to the Founders, is visible at the left of the front door. Brooks was present for its dedication.

=== Retirement ===
Brooks made his retirement home in Amherst.

Brooks had maintained correspondence with, and occasional activity with his collegiate fraternity for his entire life. In 1893, at the twenty-year anniversary of the founding, Brooks was appointed a committee of one to prepare an updated constitution for the order, which was adopted unanimously. It settled a long-simmering debate on the emerging structure of the national organization. In 1902 he participated in the induction of the Fraternity's new Omicron chapter at M.I.T. Brooks continued to attend occasional meetings and lend his voice to policy debates during his older years.

With Founder Campbell, Brooks made a pilgrimage to Old North Hall on May 12, 1923 for the dedication of "The Shrine," a plaque honoring the fraternity that was dedicated on the wall of that building which was a classroom and dormitory where the now thriving Order had been founded 50 years prior. (Old North was razed for the construction of Machmer Hall in 1957, and The Shrine was moved to the entrance of the new building.) The two followed up this appearance by joining the 1926 Convention in Philadelphia, and to the surprise and joy of many, they both traveled nearly 3,000 miles to the 1928 San Francisco Convention of the Fraternity.

After his first wife died (1924) he married Grace L. Holden in 1927 at the age of seventy-six.

Brooks died at the age of 86 in Amherst, Massachusetts in 1938. He had been the sole surviving Founder since the death of Campbell nine years earlier.

The Brooks House, a dormitory on the UMass campus, built in 1948, was named in his honor.

== Selected works ==
- "Conditions Affecting the Strength of the Stomach of the Calf for Rennet", Hatch Experiment Station Bulletin No. 11 (1891)
- "Soil Tests with Fertilizers for Corn" Hatch Experiment Station Bulletin No. 14 (1891)
- "Soil Tests with Fertilizers for Potatoes, Oats and Corn" Hatch Experiment Station Bulletin No. 18 (1892)
- "How to Keep Up the Fertility of Our Farms", Forty-Second Annual Report of the Secretary of the Massachusetts State Board of Agriculture (1895)
- "Experiment Station Accuracy", correspondence with Andrew H. Ward (1899)
- "Agriculture" (1901)

- "Soils, Formation", Volume I
- "Manures, Fertilizers & Farm Crops", Volume II
- "Animal Husbandry", Volume III

- "Drainage" Fifty-Sixth Annual Report of the Secretary of the Massachusetts State Board of Agriculture (1908)
- "Poultry Farming for Women", from Vocations for the Trained Woman (1910)
- "The Hay Crop in Massachusetts", "Grasses and Forage Crops", Massachusetts Agricultural Bulletin No. 3 (1915)
- "The Management of Mowings", "Grasses and Forage Crops", Massachusetts Agricultural Bulletin No. 3 (1915)
- "Clovers: Their Value, Characteristics of Varieties and Methods of Production, "Grasses and Forage Crops", Massachusetts Agricultural Bulletin No. 3 (1915)
- "A Fertilizer Experiment with Asparagus", coauthored F. W. Morse, Massachusetts Agricultural Experiment Station Bulletin No. 194 (1919)
- "Methods of Applying Manure", Massachusetts Agricultural Experiment Station Bulletin No. 196 (1920)
