= Milton Harris (scientist) =

American chemist

- Harris in the 1980s.
- Born: March 21, 1906; Los Angeles, California, United States
- Died: September 12, 1991 (aged 85); Chevy Chase, Maryland, United States
- Education: Oregon State University; Yale University
- Known for: Founder of the Harris Research Laboratories
- Spouse: Carolyn Wolf (m. 1934)
- Children: 1
- Awards: Perkin Medal (1970); Wilbur Cross Medal (1974); Priestley Medal (1980); American Institute of Chemists Gold Medal (1982)
- Scientific career
- Workplaces: National Bureau of Standards; Harris Research Laboratories; Gillette Company

Milton Harris (March 21, 1906 – September 12, 1991) was an American chemist. Harris founded the Harris Research Laboratories, which later merged with Gillette, and was chairman of the board of directors for the American Chemical Society from 1966 to 1972.

== Career ==
=== Early life and education ===
Born in Los Angeles, Harris was raised in Portland, Oregon. At the age of twelve or thirteen, his first independent business enterprise was building crystal radio sets, and in high school, chemistry became of interest. He entered college at Oregon State University, where he became a member of Phi Sigma Kappa. Harris graduated in 1926. Despite the fact that a formal chemistry department did not exist at Oregon, he earned a degree in chemical engineering. In 1929, Harris received a Doctor of Philosophy in Chemistry from Yale University.

=== Early career ===
Upon his graduation from Yale, Harris took his first job as a chemist at the Cheney Brothers Mill. Two years later, he joined a new textile chemistry research group at the National Bureau of Standards. Harris was later appointed director of the group, which would ultimately produce roughly two-hundred scientific papers. Along with Vincent du Vigneaud, Harris made important discoveries in regards to similarities between the molecular geometry of human hair, insulin, and wool. With the beginning of American involvement in World War II, Harris’ group began advising the United States Army Quartermaster Corps about textiles such as using Bedford cord. They aided the research and redesign of sandbags, tent cloths, and chemical additives in military underwear used to protect soldiers from the effects of gas attacks.

=== Later stages ===
After the end of the war, Harris founded the Harris Research Laboratories, which operated as a consulting laboratory for several companies such as the American Enka Company and Gillette. His association with the latter grew over time. In 1955, Gillette bought the Harris Research Laboratories and appointed Harris as Vice President of Research. Just before retirement, in 1966, he was approached by the American Chemical Society to serve on its board of directors. Harris accepted and served as chairman for six years. In 1975, he headed a panel that produced a study, which was instrumental to the recommendation by the National Academy of Sciences for widespread cultivation of jojoba shrubs. A year later, Harris also joined the National Academy of Engineering. Harris received the Priestley Medal in 1980. He died of stomach cancer in Chevy Chase in 1991.

=== Legacy ===
Papers dating from between 1925 and 1991 from the career of Harris are currently held at The Valley Library at his alma mater, Oregon State University. The school has an endowed professorship in his honor called the Milton Harris Chair Professor of Materials Science, which since 2006, has been held by Mas Subramanian. Oregon State also gives the Milton Harris Award for Excellence in Basic Research to science scholars, which was won by Dawn Wright in 2005. Harris' other alma mater, Yale, also has a Milton Harris ’29 Ph.D. Professor of Chemistry, once held by Alanna Schepartz in the early 2000s.

== See also ==
- List of members of the National Academy of Engineering (Chemical)
- List of Oregon State University people
- List of people from Los Angeles
- List of people with surname Harris
- List of Phi Sigma Kappa brothers
- List of Yale University people
