= List of Phi Sigma Kappa members =

Phi Sigma Kappa is a college fraternity that was established in 1873, at Massachusetts Agricultural College in Amherst (now the University of Massachusetts Amherst). The following is a list of notable members of Phi Sigma Kappa, including those who were members of Phi Sigma Epsilon before the 1985 merger.

== Academia ==
Name	Original chapter	Notability	Ref.
Charles A. Anderson	Chi (Williams), 1912	Former president of Coe College, Cedar Rapids, Iowa. Former president of Tusculum College, near Greeneville, Tennessee. Presbyterian minister of the University of Pennsylvania.	
James B. Appleberry	Epsilon Iota (Central Missouri), 1962	President emeritus, Northern Michigan University, serving as president for eight years.	
Alexander Astin	Rho Deuteron (Gettysburg), 1953	Professor of Education, UCLA and Director of the Higher Educational Research Institute.	
William A. Brandenburg	Beta Epsilon (Pittsburg State), 1930	President Wayne State College, of Wayne, Nebraska.	
William P. Brooks	Alpha (Massachusetts Agricultural (UMass)), 1875	President of the Sapporo Agricultural College (now Hokkaidō University). President of the Massachusetts Agricultural College (now the University of Massachusetts Amherst). Noted author on Agricultural themes. A dormitory, Brooks House, is named in his honor. Founder, Phi Sigma Kappa	
John W. Dorsey	Eta (Maryland), 1958	Chancellor, University of Maryland Baltimore County.	
Thomas Fell	Eta (Maryland), Honorary	President of St. John's College from 1886 to 1923.	
Charles E. Glassick	Pi (Franklin & Marshall) 1953	Former president, Gettysburg College.	
Paul Edward Gray	Omicron (M.I.T.), 1954	14th President of M.I.T. from 1980 to 1990, Member of White House Science Council, Professor of Electrical Engineering at M.I.T. and respected educator.	
Douglas Greenberg	Nu Tetarton (Rutgers), 1969	Professor, University of Southern California, contributed a short documentary featured on the DVD for Schindler's List. Greenberg is also Dean of the School of Arts and Science for Rutgers University.	
Richard Herman	Iota (Stevens Institute), 1963	Former Chancellor of the University of Illinois at Urbana–Champaign.	
Charles S. Howe	Alpha (UMass), 1878	President of Case School of Applied Science 1902 to 1929, which became Case Western Reserve University, Cleveland, Ohio. Former professor of Buchtel College, which became the University of Akron, Akron, Ohio. First Grand President, Phi Sigma Kappa.	
Paul H. Jeserich	Delta Deuteron (Michigan), 1914	Dean of University of Michigan School of Dentistry, 1950–62. President of the American Dental Association, 1959.	
Perry F. Kendig	Pi (Franklin & Marshall), 1932	President, Roanoke College, from 1963 to 1975.	
Warren C. Lovinger	Epsilon Iota (Central Missouri), Honorary	President Emeritus, Central Missouri State University, now the University of Central Missouri, serving in that role for 20 years.	
Richard W. Lyman	Phi (Swarthmore) 1944	President, Rockefeller Foundation 1980–1988; Former President, Stanford University.	
Jack Magruder	Gamma Epsilon (Truman State), 1957	President of Northeast Missouri State University during its transition into Truman State University.	
Joseph F. Marsh	Delta (West Virginia), 1945	President Waynesburg University, of Waynesburg, Pennsylvania.	
James Milholland	Kappa (Penn State), 1911	President, Board of Trustees, and Acting President Penn State.	
Veranus Alva Moore		professor and dean of the New York State Veterinary College at Cornell University	
J. C. Powell	Phi Deuteron (Kentucky), 1951	President Eastern Kentucky University.	
Robert D. Putnam	Phi (Swarthmore), 1963	Malkin Professor of Public Policy at Harvard, Distinguished Visiting Professor at Aarhus University in Denmark, former visiting professor and director of the Manchester Graduate Summer Programme in Social Change at the University of Manchester, England. Consulted with President Clinton on civic engagement. Wrote seminal book, Bowling Alone to address America's loss of community engagement and social capital, and what can be done about it.	
Frank Prentice Rand	Chi (Williams), 1912	Former Dean of the School of Liberal Arts at Massachusetts Agricultural (UMass), Amherst, Massachusetts	
J. Ben Robinson	Eta (Maryland), 1914	President of dental schools at both West Virginia University and at Maryland	
Kenneth C. Rogers	Xi (St. Lawrence), 1950	President Emeritus Stevens Institute of Technology. Former member, Nuclear Regulatory Commission.	
Daniel F. Sullivan	Xi (St. Lawrence), 1965	president of Allegheny College, Carleton College, and St. Lawrence University	
James S. Vinson	Rho Deuteron (Gettysburg), 1963	president of the University of Evansville	
Framroze M. Virjee	Kappa Pentaton (Santa Barbara), 1982	President of California State University, Fullerton	
Ellis F. White	Xi (St. Lawrence), 1933	Former president, Essex County College, New Jersey.	
John D. Williams	Phi Deuteron (Kentucky), 1926	Chancellor Emeritus, University of Mississippi.	

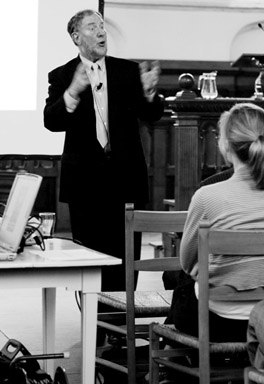
Robert Putnam, Harvard

== Business ==
Name	Original chapter	Notability	Ref.
Richard A. Baker	Gamma (Cornell), 1988	Governor and CEO, Hudson's Bay Company	
John F. Brock	Kappa Deuteron (Georgia Tech), 1970	Current President and CEO, Coca-Cola Enterprises	
D. William Brosnan	Kappa Deuteron (Georgia Tech), 1928	Retired President, Southern Railway System	
E. Patrick Coady	Omicron (MIT), 1960	Former Director of the World Bank, Chairman of Coady Diemar Partners	
George B. Cortelyou	Lambda (George Washington), 1896	President of the Consolidated Gas Company (now ConEd), 1909–1935. First United States Secretary of Commerce and Labor. Also served as United States Postmaster General and United States Secretary of the Treasury. Chairman of the Republican National Committee in 1904, and manager of the successful Roosevelt campaign. See also listing under Government.	
Louis W. Dawson	Gamma (Cornell), 1919	Former President, Mutual Life Insurance Company of New York	
Reginald Fils-Aime	Gamma (Cornell), 1983	President & COO of Nintendo of America	
Samuel Chester Gale	Beta Deuteron (Minnesota), 1916	Vice-President, General Mills, President, the Ad Council, developed brand identities Betty Crocker and Wheaties. Credited with the development of the first radio advertising jingle	
Walter L. Huber	Omega (Ridge Road) (California), 1905	engineer, mountaineer, and conservationist.	
Reginald H. Jones	Mu (Penn), 1939	Retired Chairman of the Board, Chief Executive Officer, General Electric Company	
Pete Mauthe	Kappa (Penn State), 1913	President, Youngstown Sheet and Tube Company. President and director of the Olga Coal Company, the Buckeye Coal Company, and the Youngstown Mines Corporation. Began his career as a blast furnace laborer with the Carnegie Steel Company. Four-year letterman for the Nittany Lions, as fullback; elected to College Football Hall of Fame in 1957. Served on Board of Trustees for both Penn State and Youngstown State University.	
Robert Mondavi	Nu Deuteron (Stanford), 1936	Former Chairman, Robert Mondavi Winery	
Mendel Rosenblum	Psi (Virginia), 1984	Co-founder of VMware, an American software company providing cloud and virtualization software and services. Now a subsidiary of EMC Corporation.	
Jack Welch	Alpha (UMass), 1957	Former Chairman of the Board and CEO of General Electric Co.	
Daniel Willard	Alpha (UMass), 1882	President, Baltimore and Ohio Railroad 1910–1941. Trustee and Chairman of the Board, Johns Hopkins University, 1926–1941.	

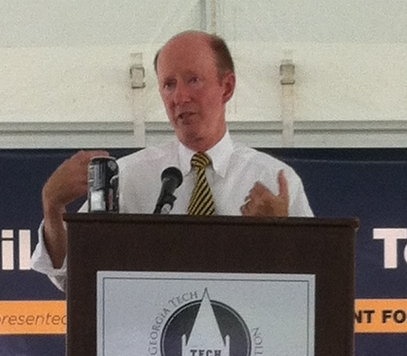
John Brock, Coca-Cola

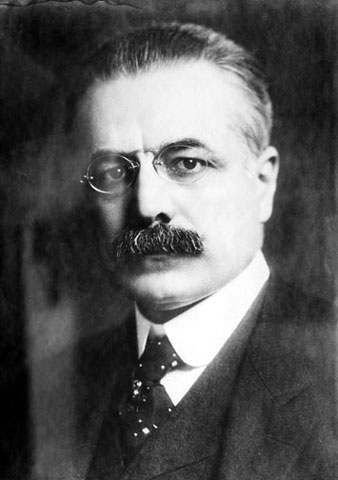
George Cortelyou, ConEd

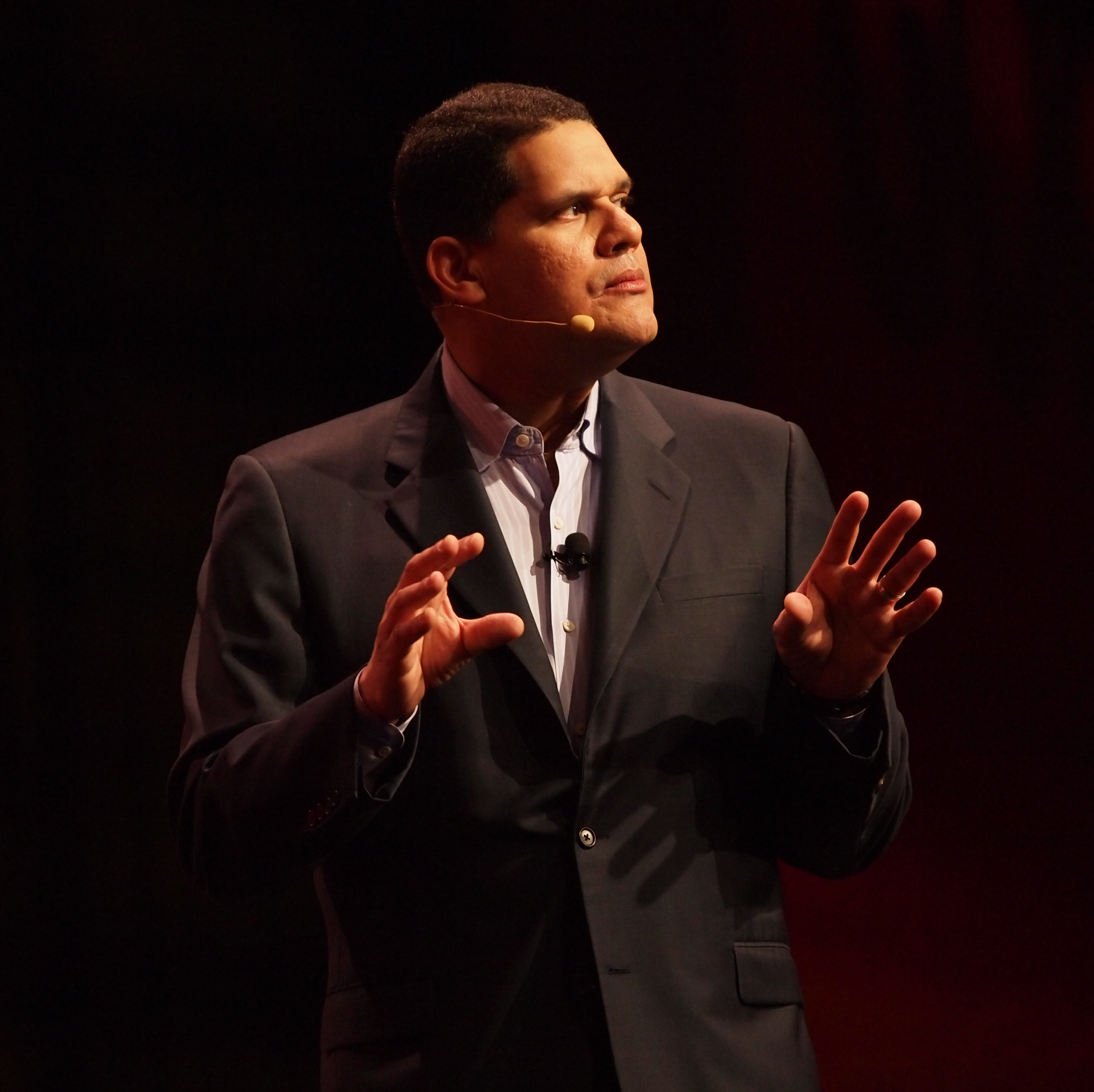
Reggie Fils-Aime, Nintendo

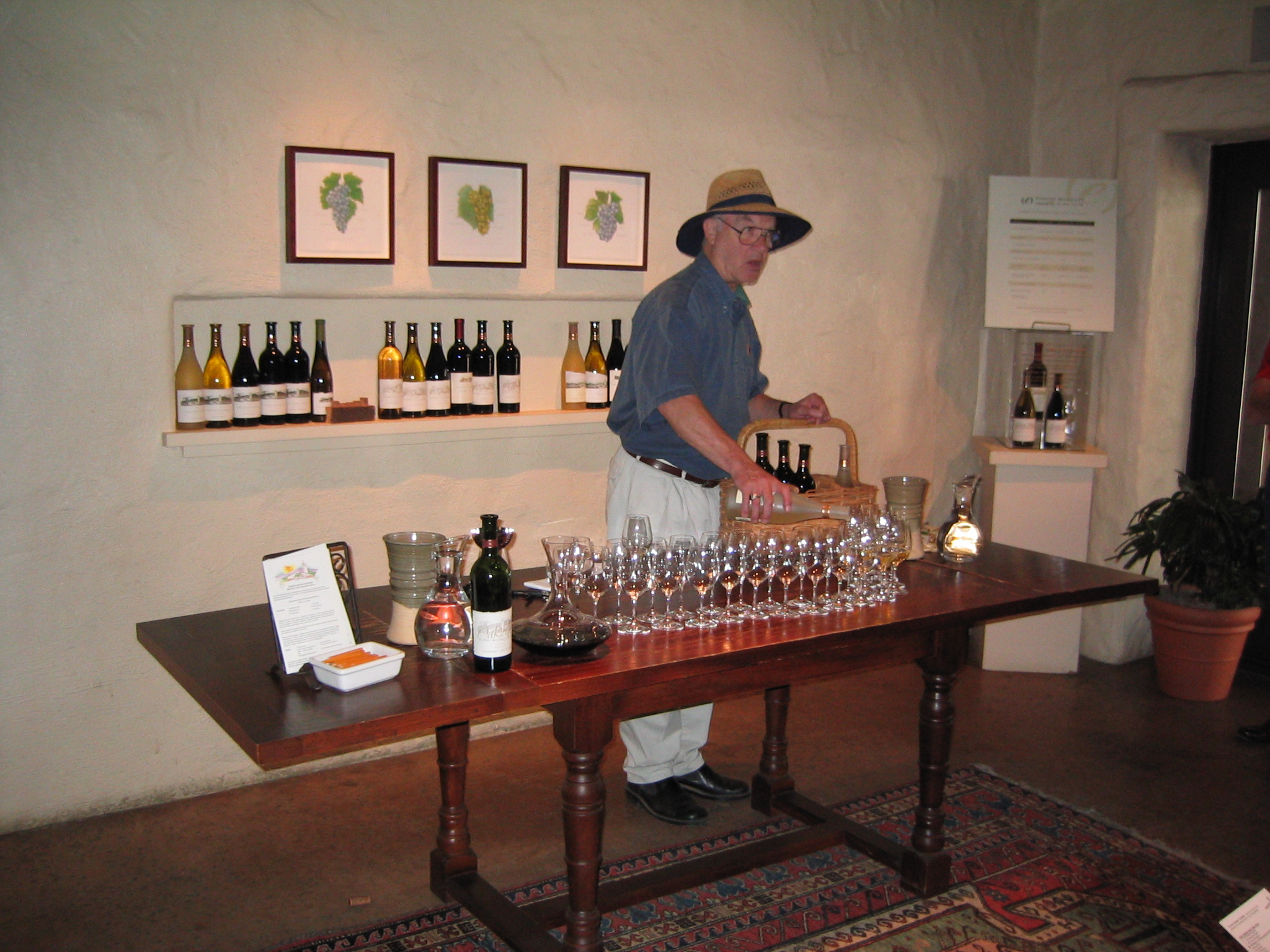
Robert Mondavi, winemaker

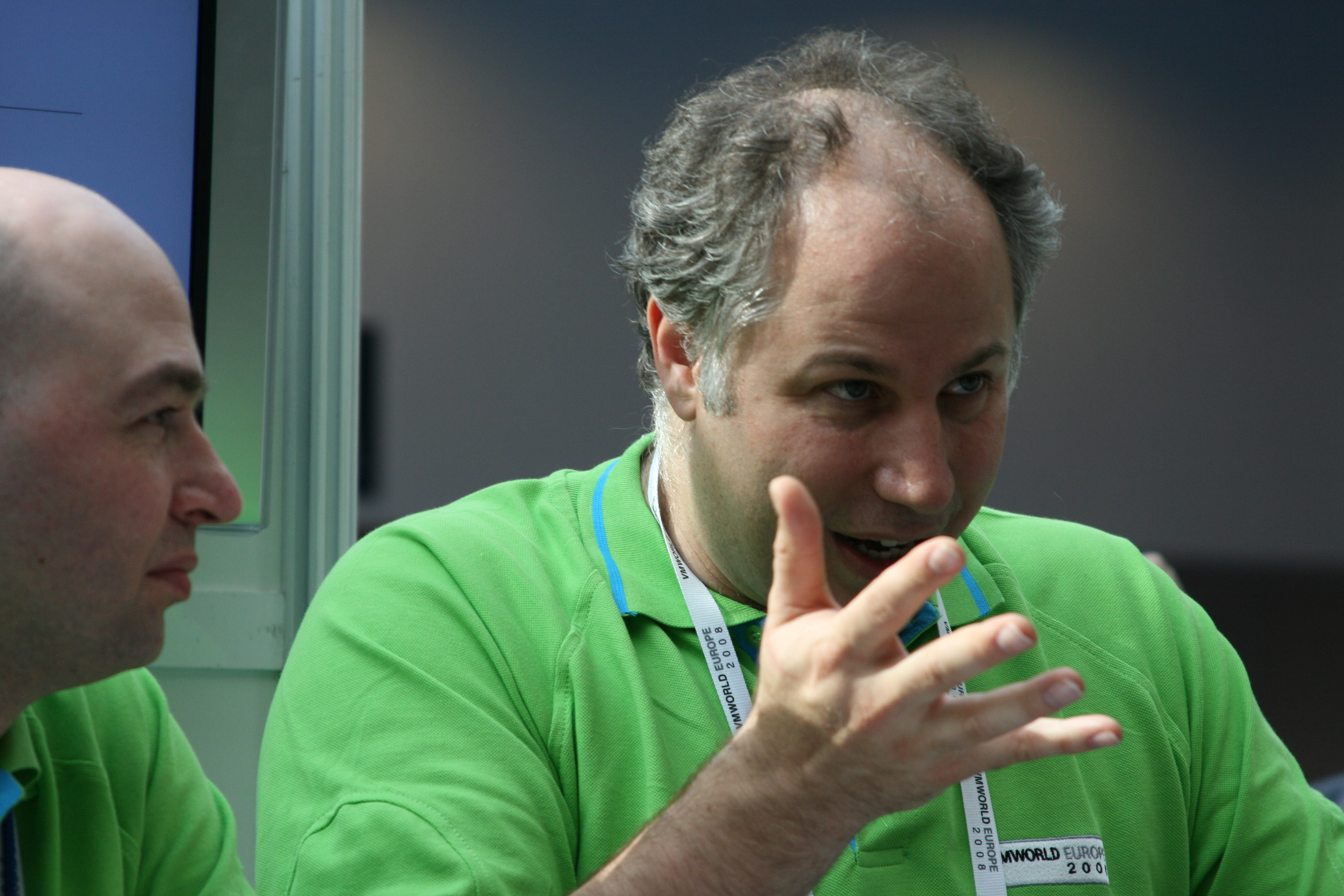
Mendel Rosenblum, VMware

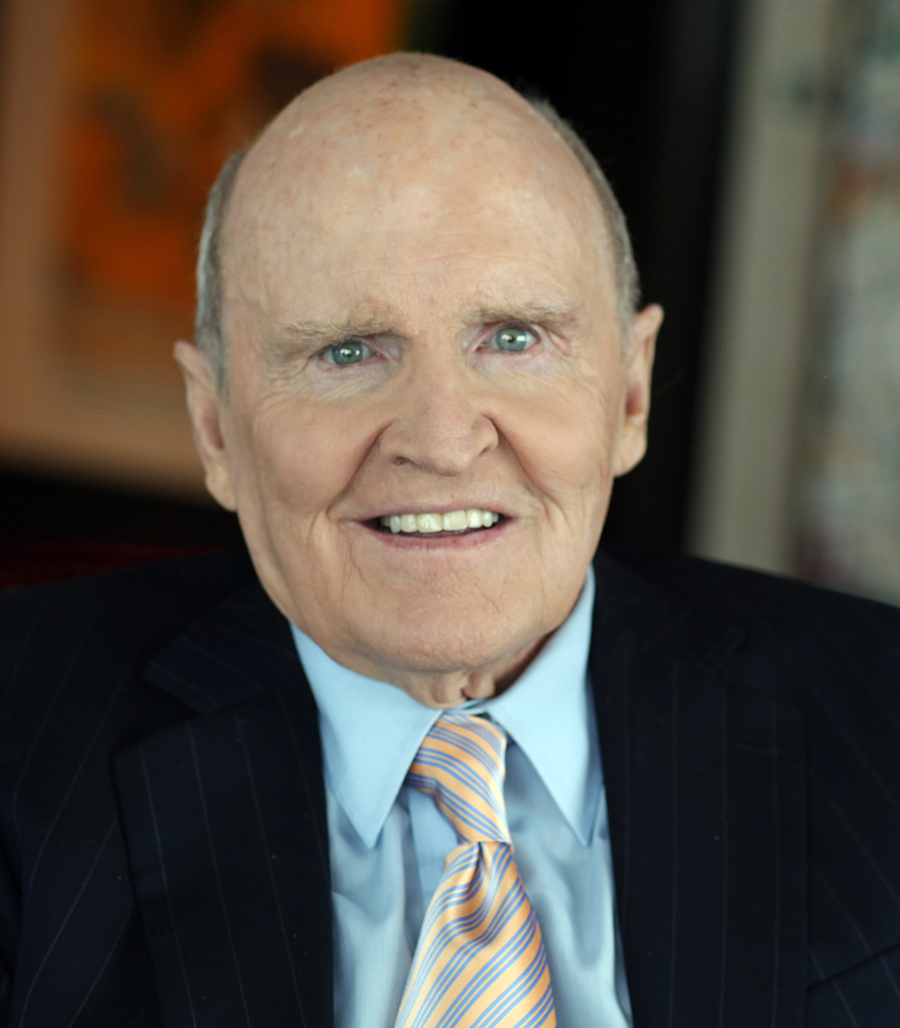
Jack Welch, GE

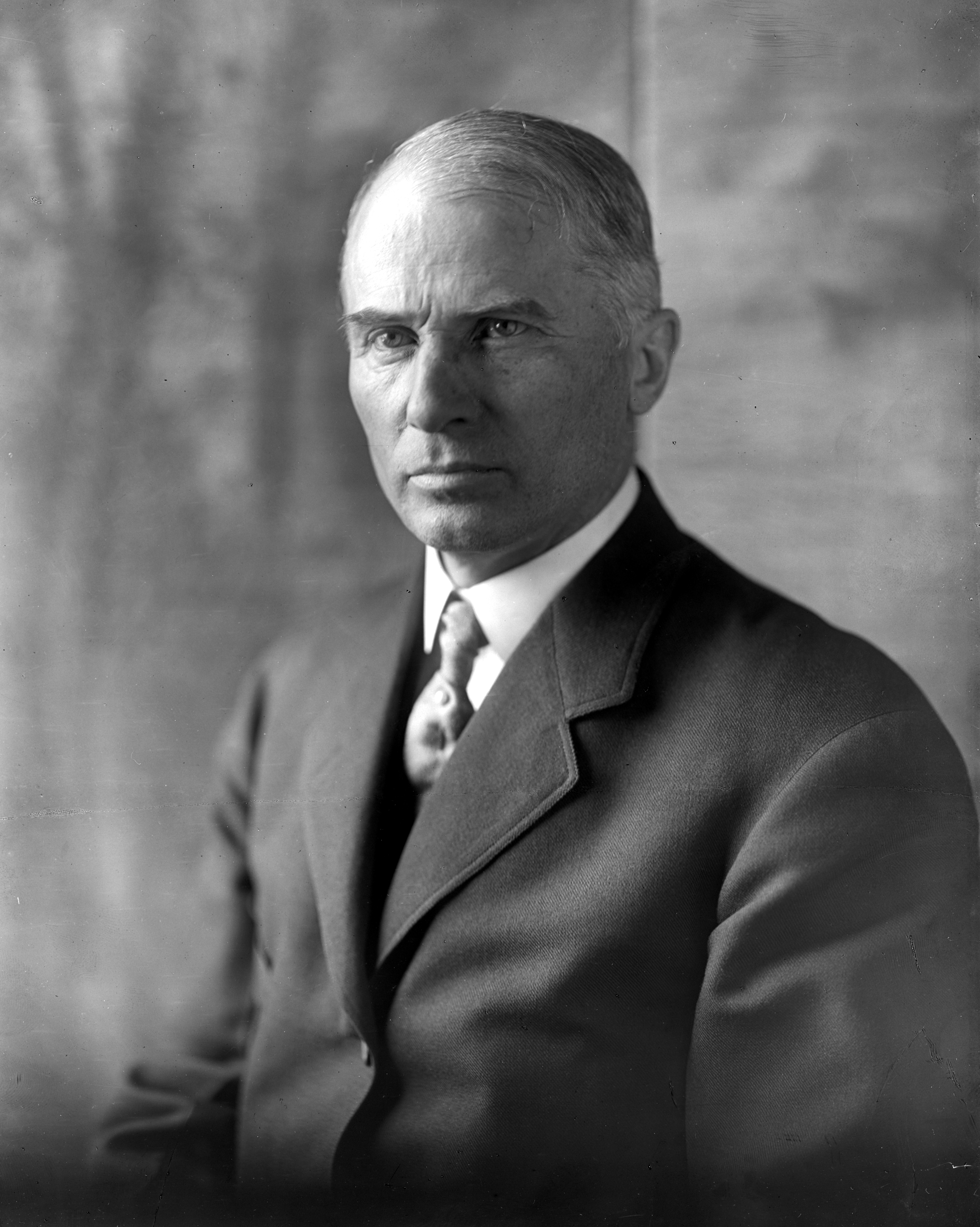
Daniel Willard, B&O Railroad

== Entertainment ==
Name	Original chapter	Notability	Ref.
Alan Baxter	Chi (Williams), 1930	Television and motion picture actor from 1935 to 1966. A popular character actor of his day, portraying classic villains, his credits include many film, stage and television appearances, for example, Perry Mason and The Virginian.	
David Cook	Epsilon Iota (Central Missouri), 2006	Rock musician, winner of television show American Idol Season #7 in 2008.	
Frank Filipetti	Iota Triton (Connecticut), 1968	Grammy Award-winning recording engineer.	
David French	Gamma (Cornell), 1960	Former news anchor, CNN.	
Squire Fridell	Phi Tetarton (U. Pacific), 1964	Television actor, has appeared in over three thousand television commercials. Portrayed "The Toyotaman" in American TV ads for The Toyota Motor Corporation. Served as the official "Ronald McDonald" clown character commercials for McDonald's restaurants. Supporting character roles in Rosetti and Ryan, M*A*S*H, Newhart, Ironside and Adam-12.	
Burl Ives	Epsilon Delta (Eastern Illinois), 1931	Actor and folksinger.	
Don Knotts	Delta (West Virginia) 1946	Television and movie comedian; Five-time Emmy Award winner	
James Loper	Chi Triton (Arizona State), 1953	Executive Director, Academy of Television Arts and Sciences	
Cheech Marin	Xi Pentaton (Cal State Northridge), 1968	Comedian and Actor	
James Pier Mason	Gamma Deuteron (Iowa State), 1911	Screen actor, veteran of more than 200 films between 1914 and 1952. He was born in France, resided in Iowa and Minnesota, and for most of his life, in California.	
T. J. Miller	Lambda (George Washington), 2003	Actor and comedian	
Martin Milner	Omega Deuteron (USC), 1953	Television actor, Route 66, Adam 12, etc.	
John Bennett Perry	Xi (St. Lawrence), 1963	Stage, film and television actor, and musician. Also father to actor Matthew Perry.	
Chris Sarandon	Delta (West Virginia), 1964	Film actor	
David Selby	Delta (West Virginia), 1963	Television and stage actor	
Red Skelton	Gamma Epsilon (NE Missouri State), Honorary	Emmy Award-winning television comedian	
Tom Smothers	Xi Triton (San Jose State), 1961	One of the Smothers Brothers, popular folk-singing and comedy team	
Dean Torrence	Omega Deuteron (USC), 1966	Musician, member of Jan & Dean musical group.	
Barton Yarborough	Omega Deuteron (USC), 1925	Radio and TV performer. Notable for the role of Clifford on Carlton E. Morse's "One Man's Family," an NBC show that featured him for nearly 20 years. He also had the role of Sgt. Ben Romero on "Dragnet."	

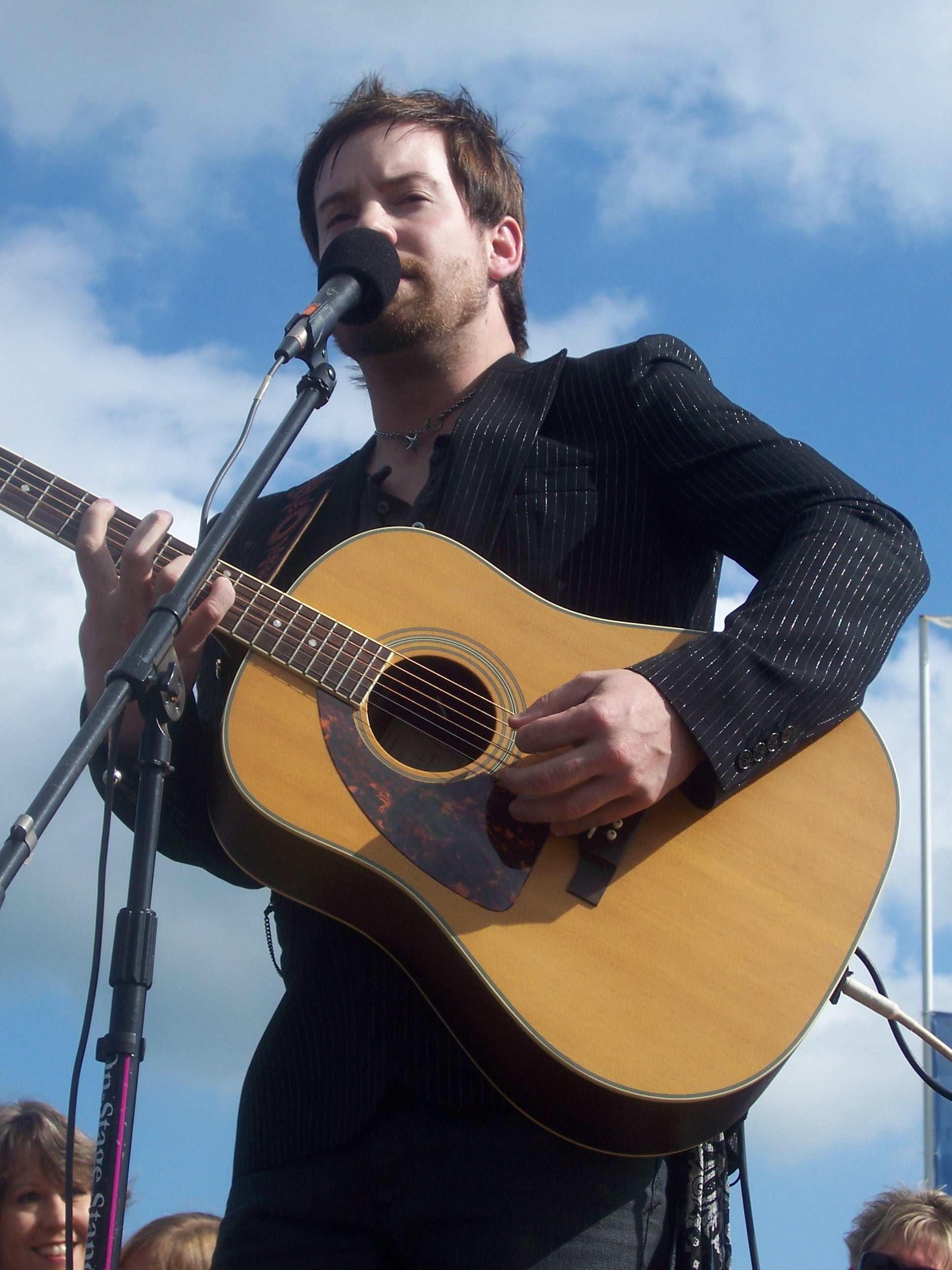
David Cook, musician

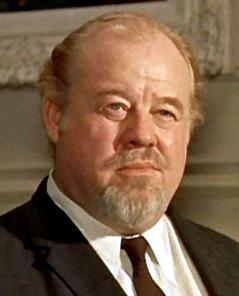
Burl Ives, musician

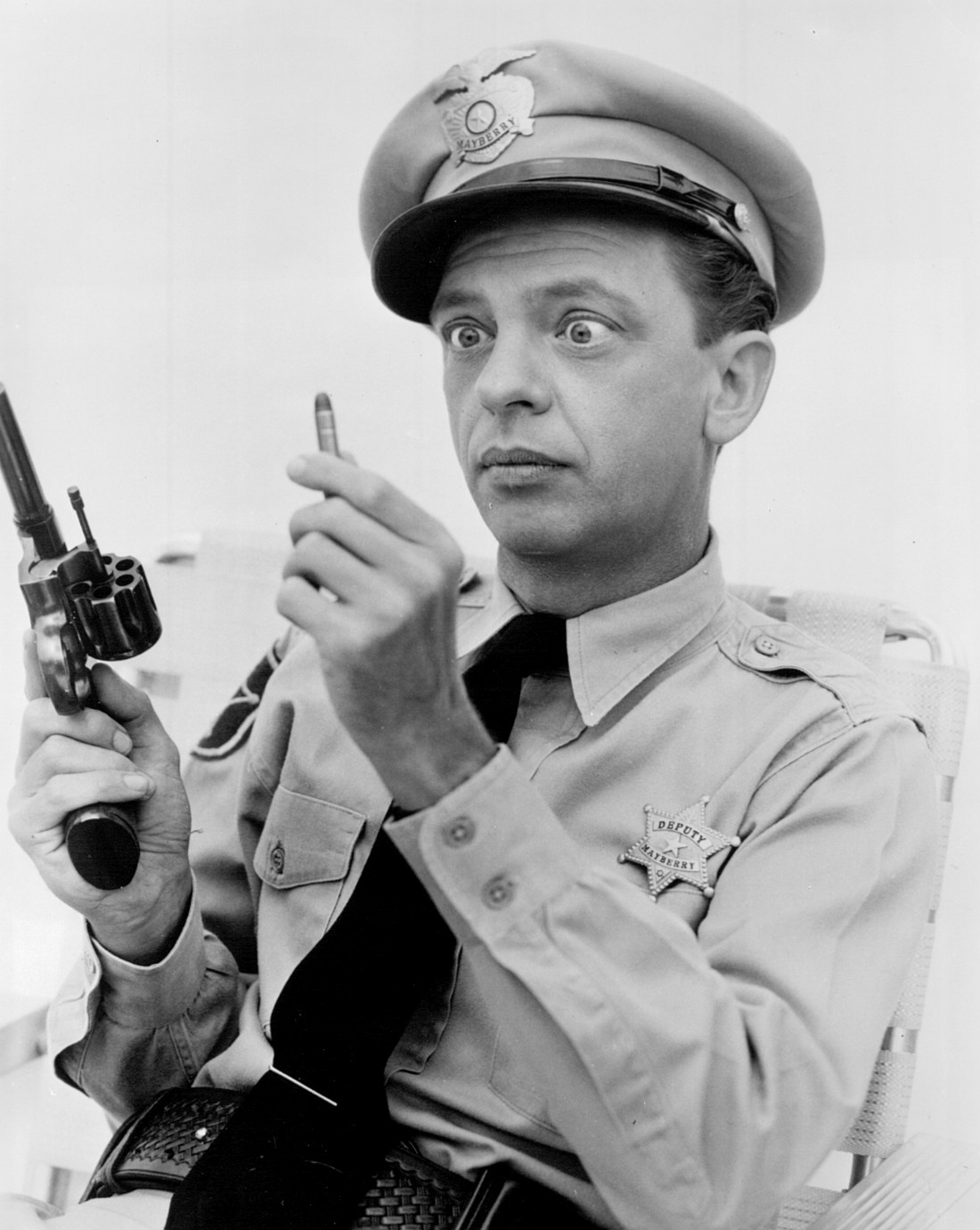
Don Knotts, actor

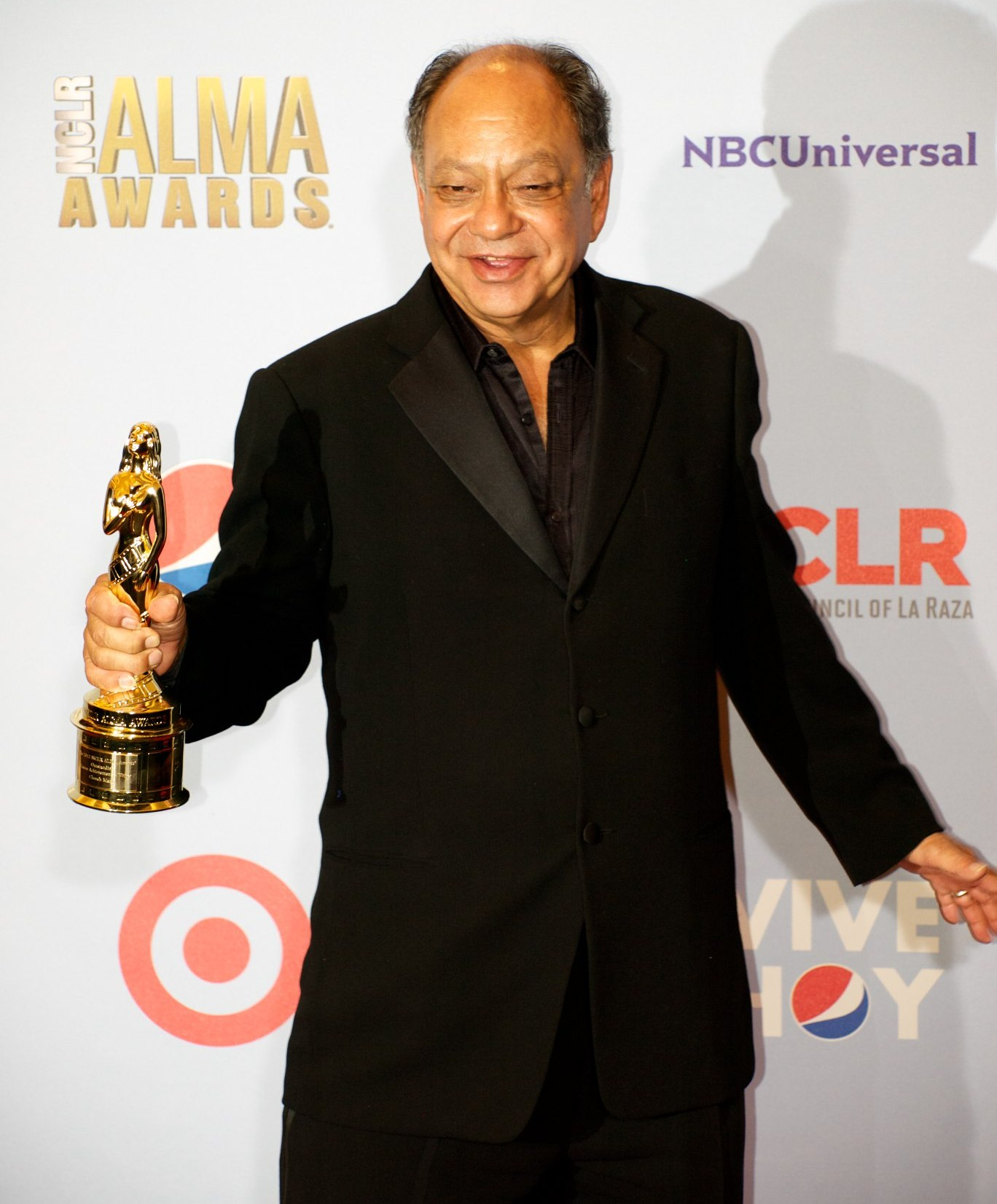
Cheech Marin, comedian

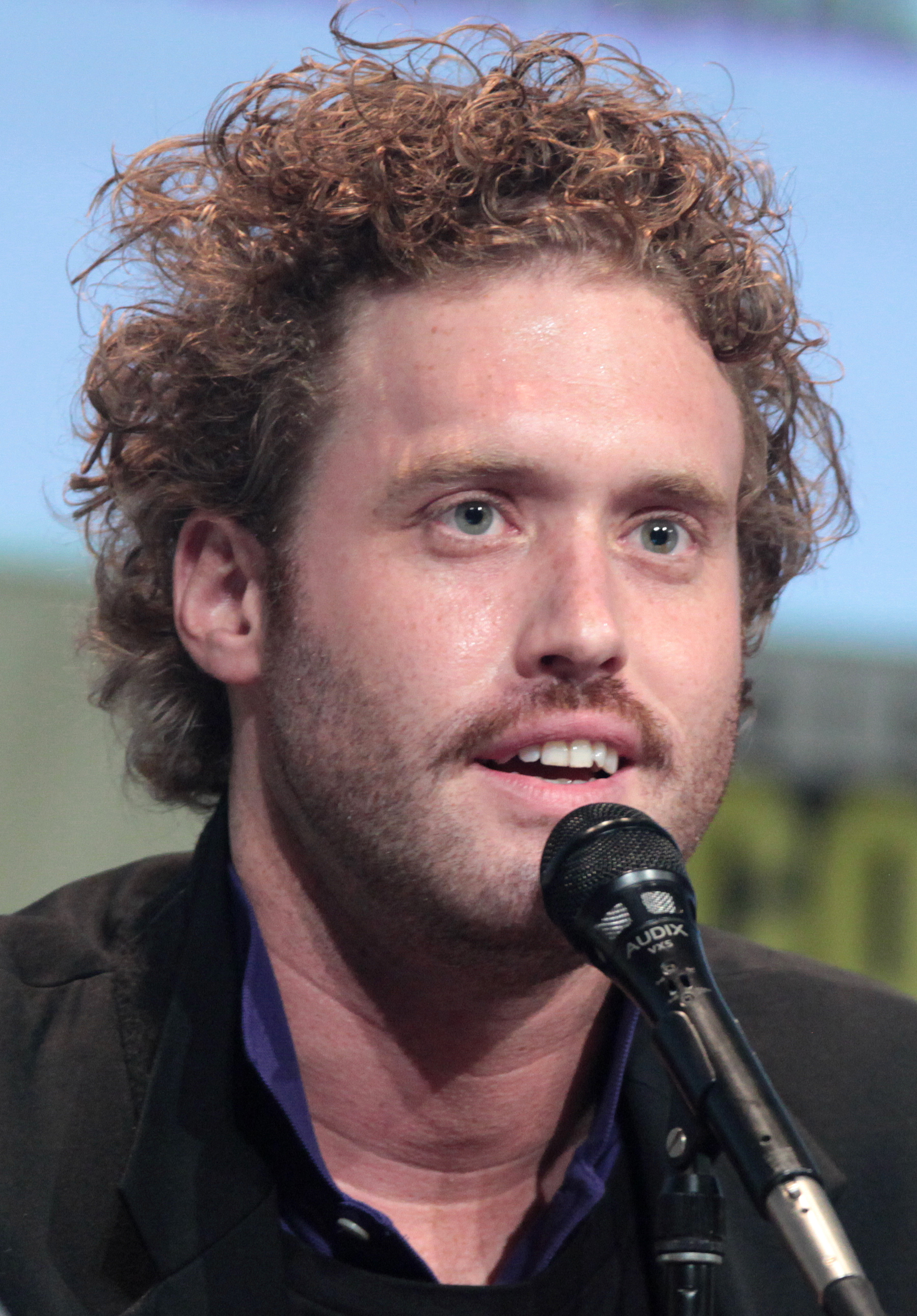
T.J Miller, actor

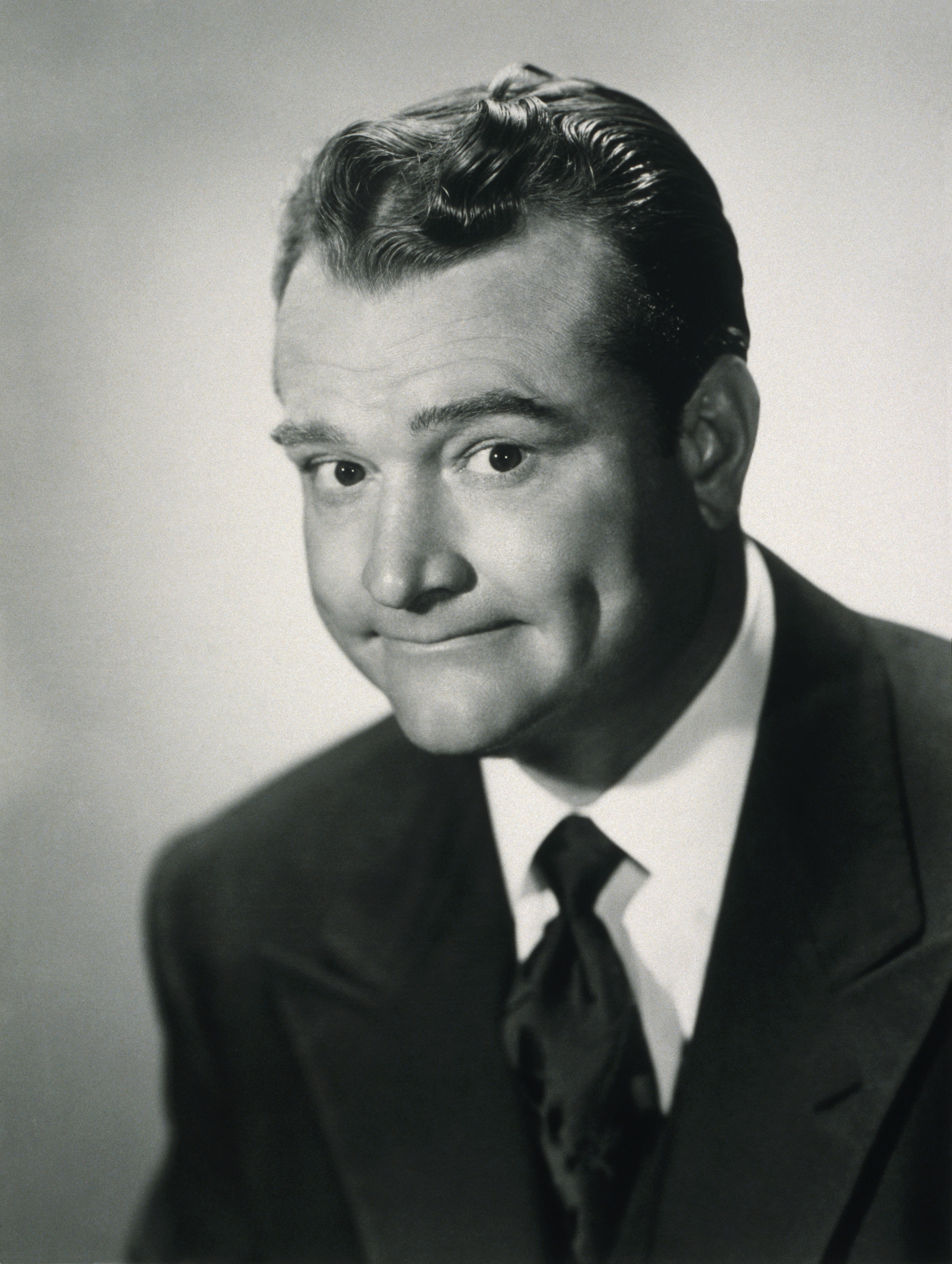
Red Skelton, comedian

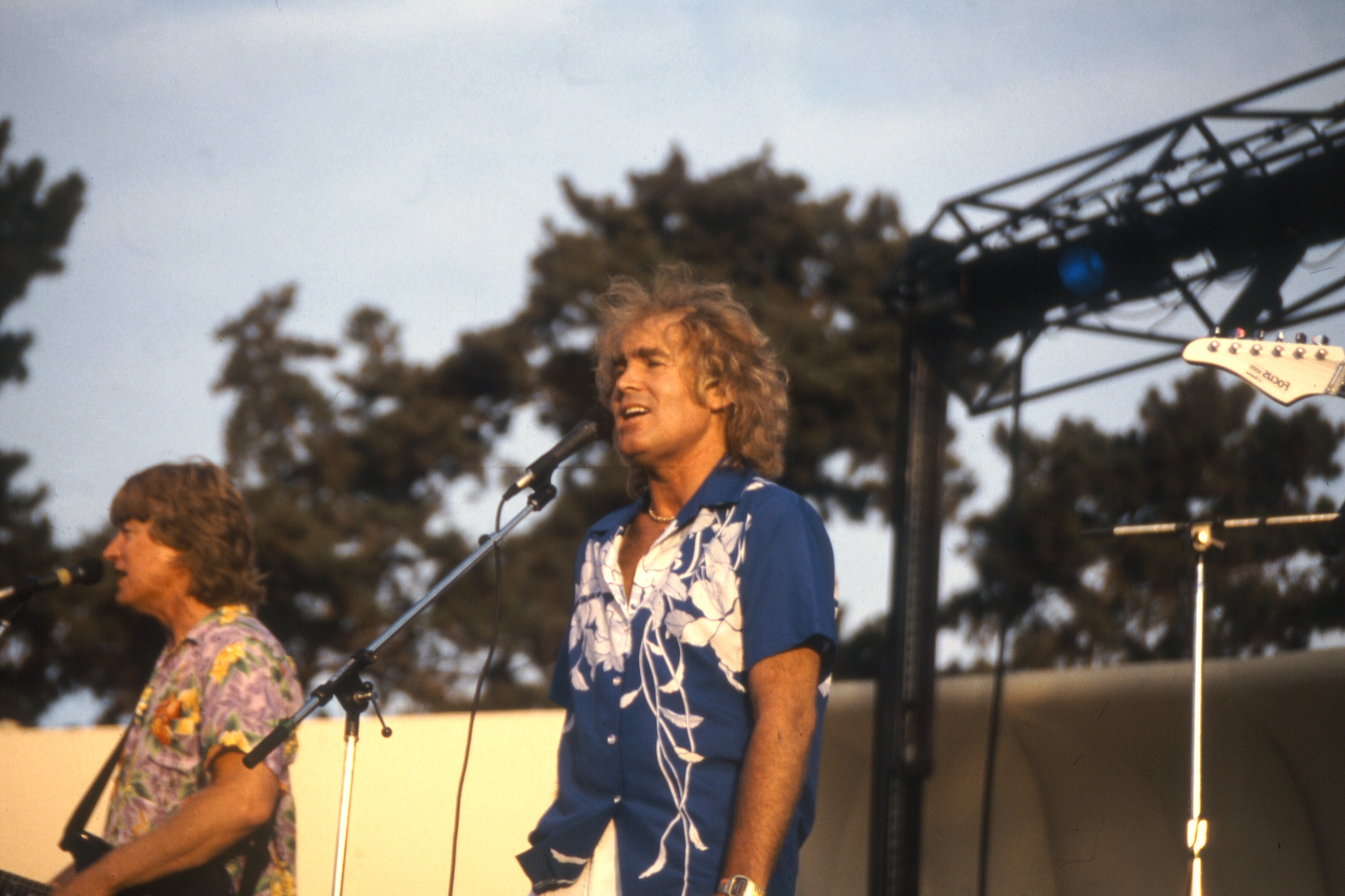
Dean Torrence (r.), musician

== Literature and journalism ==
Name	Original chapter	Notability	Ref.
Gary Brandner	Lambda Deuteron (Washington), 1955	Author, The Howling (1977).	
Arnold W. Gingrich	Delta Deuteron (Michigan), 1925	Co-Founder, Editor and Publisher for over forty years (1933–1976), Esquire Magazine.	
A. B. Guthrie Jr.	Mu Deuteron (Montana), 1923	Pulitzer Prize-winning author of The Way West (1949). Wrote Academy Award-nominated screenplay for Shane (1953). Other novels include The Big Sky (1947) and These Thousand Hills (1956).	
John S. Knight	Gamma (Cornell), 1918	Publisher and owner, Knight Newspapers, including the Chicago Daily News, Detroit Free Press, Akron Beacon-Journal and Miami Herald; member of Cornell's Board of Trustees	
Robert Lindsey	Xi Triton (San Jose St.), 1956	Author, The Falcon and the Snowman (1979).	
Robert D. Putnam	Phi (Swarthmore), 1963	Influential Harvard professor (see citation under Education). On the basis of his original research wrote seminal book, Bowling Alone to address America's loss of community engagement and social capital, and what can be done about it; one of several books he has written.	
Hugh L. Smith	Beta Deuteron (University of Minnesota), 1956	Television news broadcast pioneer, anchor and news director at WTVT in Tampa, Florida.	
Gay Talese	Omicron Deuteron (Alabama), 1953	Author, The Kingdom and the Power (1969), Honor Thy Father (1971), Unto the Sons (1992), among other novels. His short story, Frank Sinatra Has a Cold, is considered by Esquire magazine and other literary critics as arguably the finest short story ever written.	
Joel Turnipseed	Beta Deuteron (Minnesota), 1993	Author, Baghdad Express: A Gulf War Memoir (2002), among other novels; contributor to GQ, The New York Times, Granta, and Salon.	

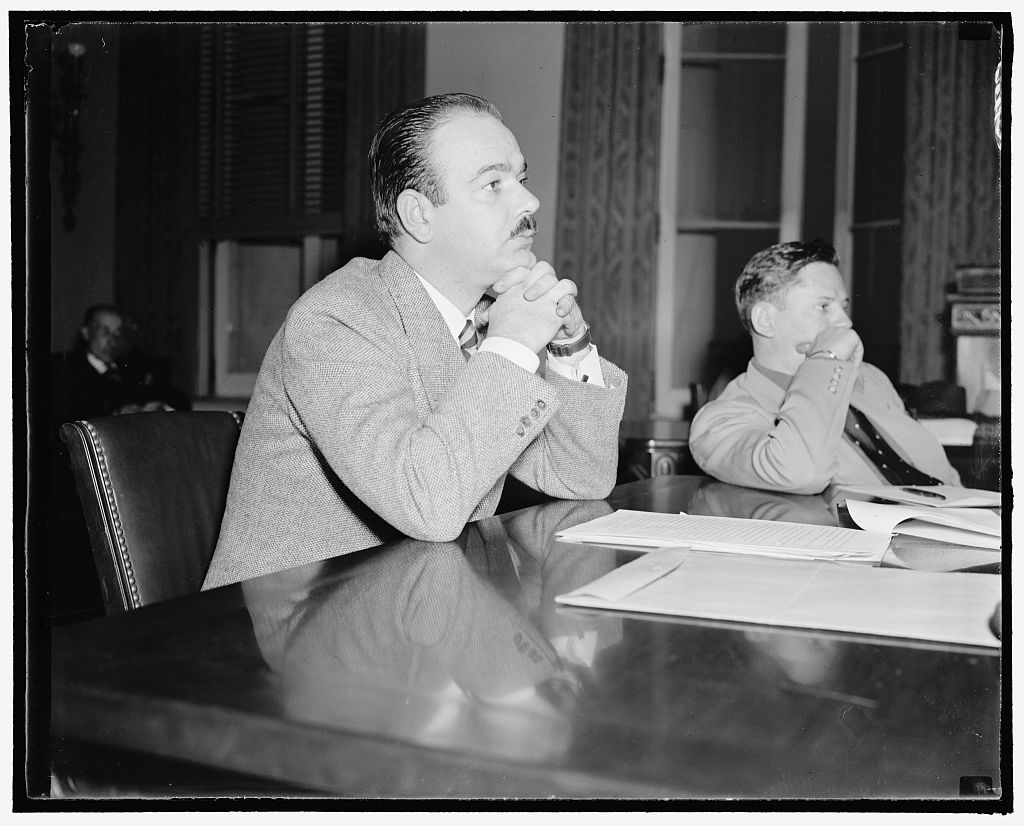
Arnold Gingrich, Esquire founder

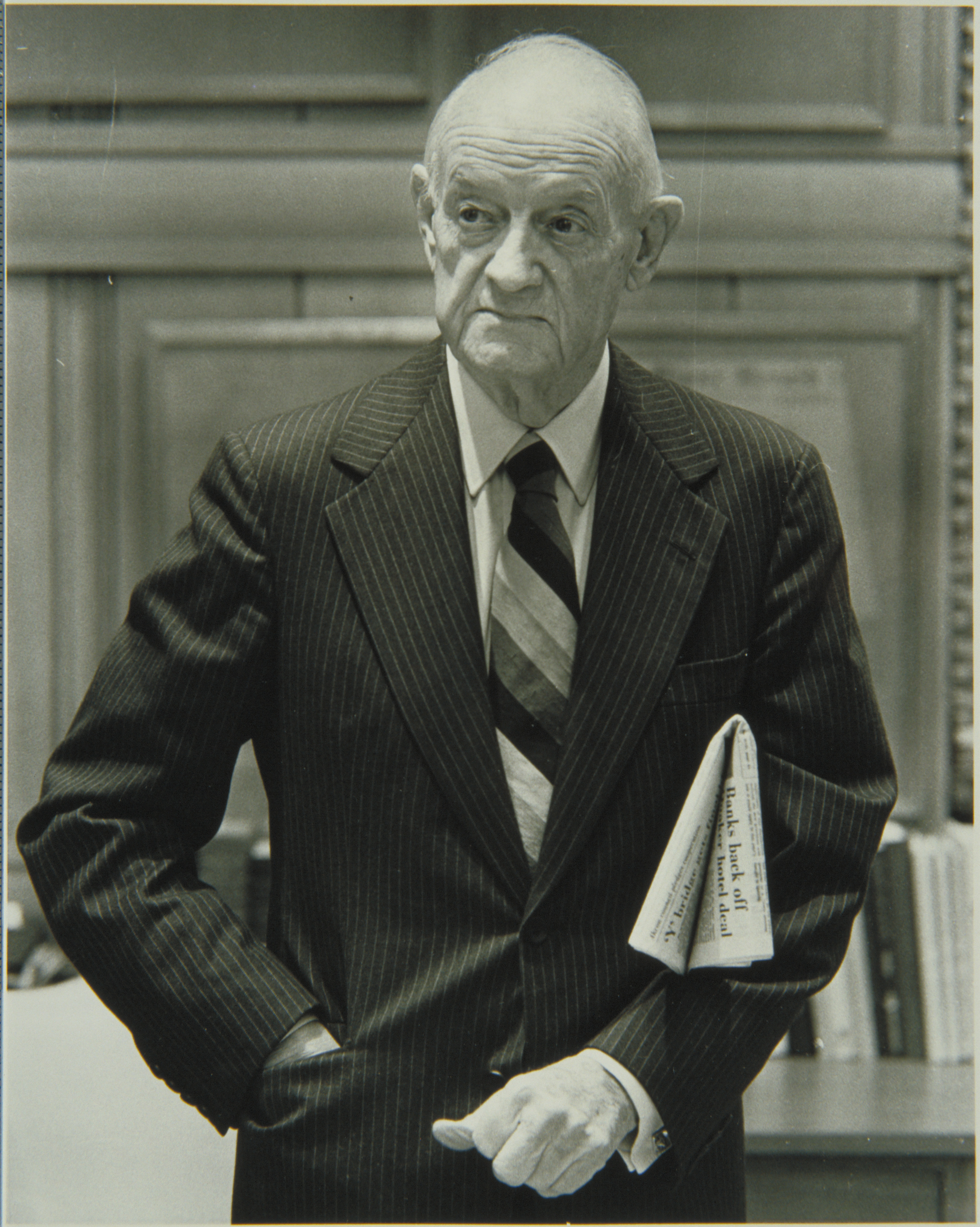
John Knight, newspaper publisher

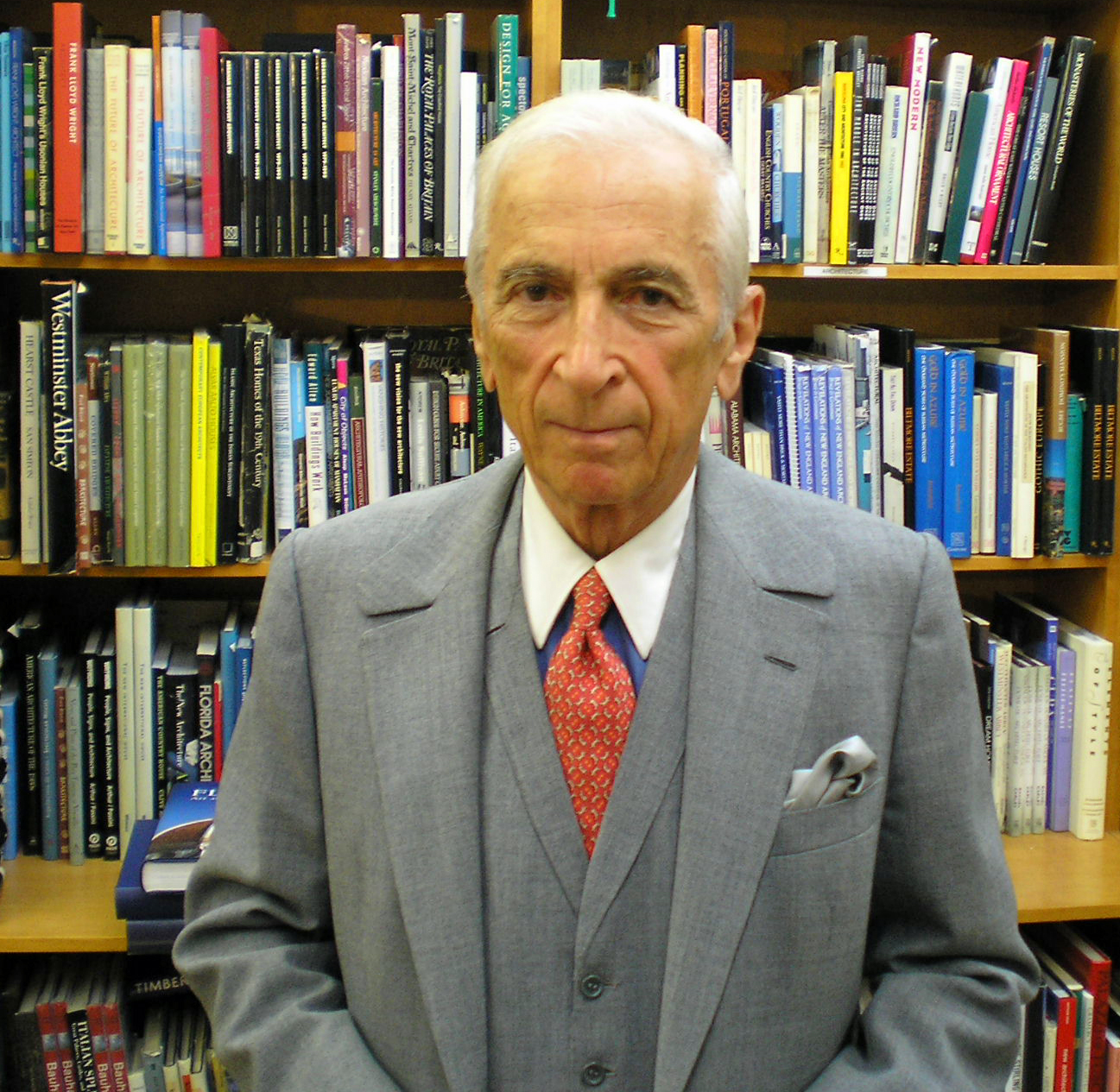
Gay Talese, writer

== Military ==
Name	Original chapter	Notability	Ref.
Bert Baston	Beta Deuteron (Minnesota), 1917	Marine Captain, WWI, Marine Colonel, WWII. Awarded Navy Cross in WWI for extraordinary heroism in action near Château-Thierry, France. Famed as one of the Devil Dogs. Named an All-American football player for two years at the University of Minnesota, later elected to the College Football Hall of Fame in 1954.	
Kenneth L. Buchanan	Alpha Deuteron (Illinois), 1917	Retired, brigadier general, WWII era.	
Lloyd L. Burke	Epsilon Rho (Henderson State), 1949	Colonel in the US Army. Saw service in Italy with US combat Engineers during WWII. Returned to graduate as an ROTC cadet, served in the Korean War saving his platoon with devastating effect on the enemy, and in Viet Nam. Served as the Army's liaison officer to the United States Congress. Awarded two Purple Hearts (3OLC), the Distinguished Service Cross, and is a Recipient of the Medal of Honor.	
William J. Flood	Lambda (George Washington), 1919	Brigadier General, chief of staff of the Seventh Air Force in the Pacific during WWII. He was wounded during the Pearl Harbor, where he was stationed as commander of Wheeler Field.	
Christopher P. Hughes	Epsilon Nu (NW Missouri State), 1983	Major General, Chief of Staff, U.S. Army, Pacific Command. Commanding General, U.S. Army Cadet Command & Fort Knox. Served two tours, 101st Airborne Division. Investigating officer for the USS Cole Commission. Decorations and awards include Distinguished Service Medal, Defense Superior Service Medal (2OLC), and Bronze Star Medal (OLC).	
Albert W. Kenner	Lambda (George Washington), 1915	Highly decorated Army Major General, retiring in 1949 to become medical director of Columbia Hospital. Awarded the Distinguished Service Cross for gallantry. In addition to his World War I decorations, he received three Silver Stars, a Purple Heart for wounds, the French Croix de guerre 1914–1918 with Palm and Legion of Honour. During World War II, he served as chief medical officer for Operation Torch and Operation Overlord.	
Onnie P. Lattu	Omega (California), 1930	Rear Admiral, U.S. Navy. Studied under Admiral Nimitz. Posted as Assistant Naval Attaché at the American Embassy, Berlin, Germany, in 1940 after previous diplomatic appointments to American Legations in Madrid, Spain; Rome, Italy; Stockholm, Sweden; and Vichy, France. After the United States entered World War II in December 1941, he was interned (held) with other military attaches in Germany until the diplomatic exchange of internees was arranged in May 1942. Recipient, Legion of Merit and Prisoner of War Medal.	
Raymond C. Meyer	Zeta (CCNY) 1939	Retired, brigadier general, combat veteran, WWII and Korean War eras. Served in the U.S. Army and later, the New York Air National Guard.	
Augustus A. Riemondy	Nu (Lehigh), 1941	Air Force Brig. General, Director of Supply and Services. Later an executive at Hershey Foods.	
Frank T. Watkins	Lambda (George Washington), 1921	Retired, rear admiral, commander of the Submarine Force, Atlantic Fleet 1954, previously Commanding Officer of the Naval School of General Line, Monterey, California, Deputy Chief of Naval Operations (Administration), Navy Department. Awarded the Legion of Merit (twice) for "exceptionally meritorious conduct in the performance of outstanding services to the Government of the United States as Commander Antisubmarine Force, U.S. Atlantic Fleet". Watkins organized and became the first Commander, Anti-Submarine Defense Force, U.S. Atlantic Fleet during the Cold War.	
Richard G. Weede	Beta Epsilon (Pittsburg State), 1932	Retired, lieutenant general, Office of the Commandant, US Marine Corps, where he completed his career as Commanding General, Fleet Marine Force, Atlantic. Twice decorated with the Navy Distinguished Service Medal. He received the Legion of Merit with Combat "V" for leadership of the 5th Marines at Punchbowl.	
Theodore Stark Wilkinson	Lambda (George Washington), 1912	Rear Admiral; Recipient of the Congressional Medal of Honor; Naval Commander in the South Pacific during World War II. Developed the "leap-frog" strategy to seize control of the Southwest Pacific islands. Awarded the Medal of Honor and the Distinguished Service Medal with 2 Gold Stars. He died young, in 1946, saving his wife during a tragic ferry accident.	
Arthur E. Williams	Xi (St. Lawrence) 1960	Retired Lieutenant General; Commander of the US Army Corps of Engineers, appointed Chief of Engineers by President George H.W. Bush in 1992.	
Amos W. Woodcock	Eta (Maryland), 1903	Retired, General Officer, WWII.	

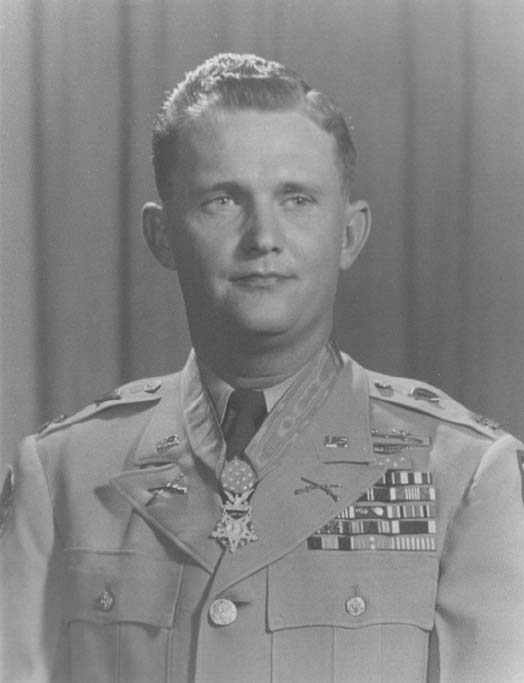
Lloyd "Scooter" Burke, Army Colonel

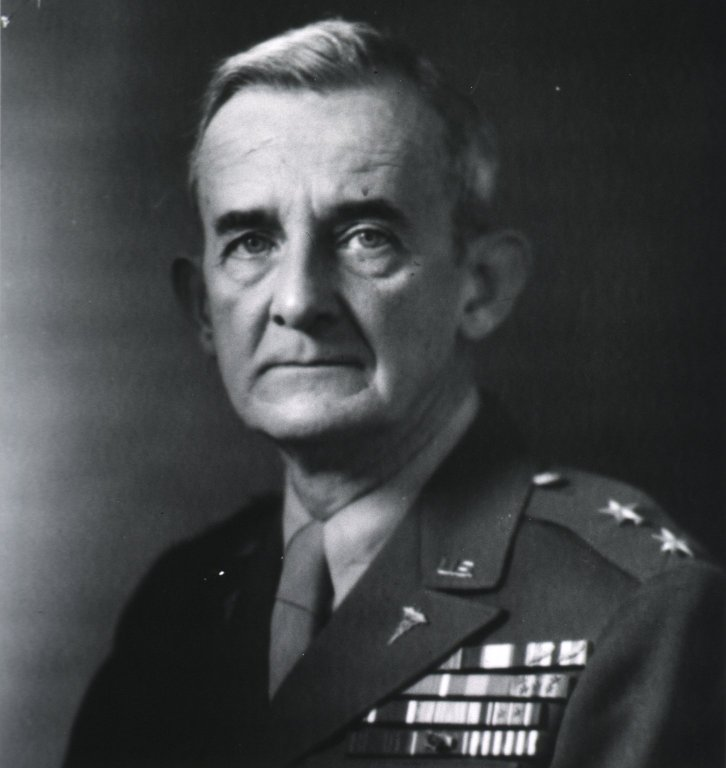
Albert Kenner, Army General

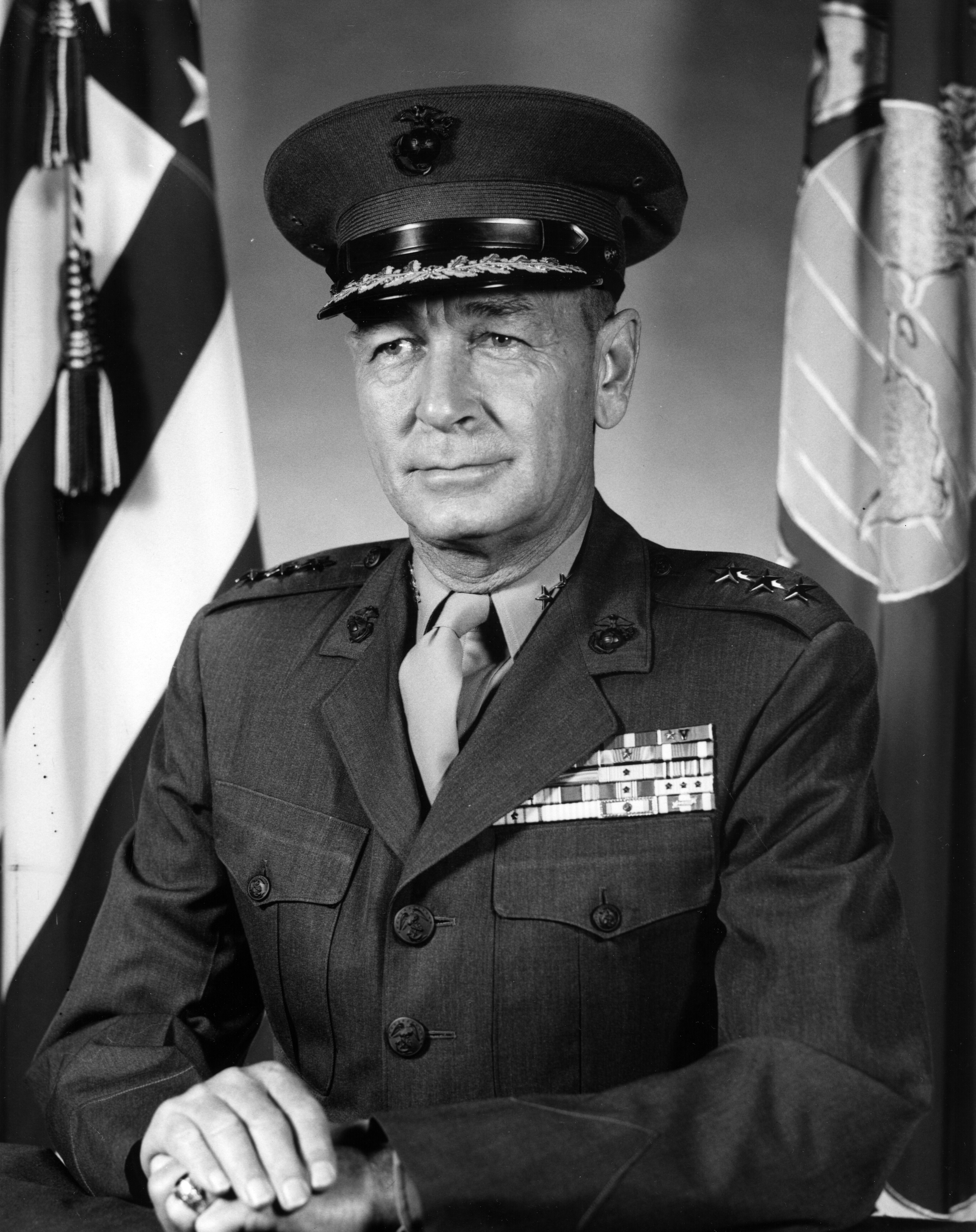
R.G. Weede, Army Lt. General

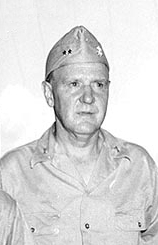
Theodore Wilkinson, Rear Admiral

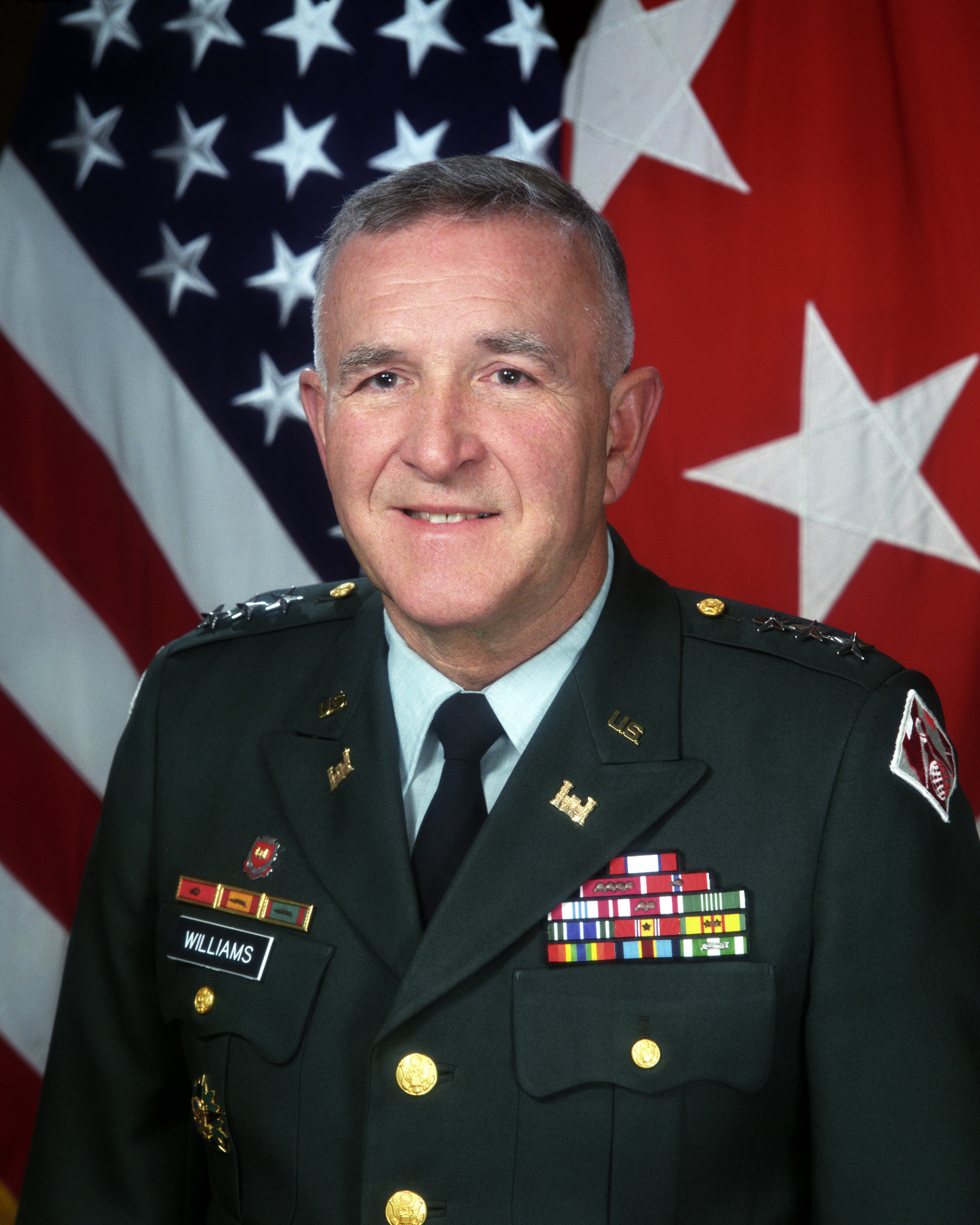
Arthur Williams, Chief of Engineers

== Politics ==
Name	Original chapter	Notability	Ref.
Carl G. Bachmann	Delta (West Virginia), 1912	Former Congressman, U.S. House of Representatives in 1924 for the First Congressional District of West Virginia. Minority Whip, 1931–1933. Elected Mayor of Wheeling in 1947.	
Frank Llewellyn Bowman	Delta (West Virginia), 1902	Former Congressman, U.S. House of Representatives 1925–1933. Mayor of Morgantown, West Virginia in 1916 and 1917.	
William Gay Brown, Jr.	Delta (West Virginia), 1877	Former Congressman, U.S. House of Representatives 1910–1916.	
Hugh M. Caldwell	Lambda (George Washington), 1903	Mayor of Seattle, Washington, 1920. See listing under Civic Leadership.	
Eric Cantor	Lambda (George Washington), 1985	Former Congressman, U.S. House of Representatives (R-VA); elected 2001. Served as Majority Leader 2011–2014.	
Joseph L. Carrigg	Beta (Union), 1925	Former Congressman U.S. House of Representatives 1951–1959.	
Anthony Coelho	Rho Tetarton (Loyola Marymount), 1964	Former U.S. Congressman from California, House Majority Whip	
George B. Cortelyou	Lambda (George Washington), 1896	First United States Secretary of Commerce and Labor. Also served as United States Postmaster General and United States Secretary of the Treasury. Chairman of the Republican National Committee in 1904, and manager of the successful Roosevelt campaign. President of the Consolidated Gas Company (now ConEd), 1909-1935.	
Thomas B. Curtis	Tau (Dartmouth), 1932	Former U.S. Congressman from Missouri, 1951–1969. Noted economist within the Congressional ranks.	
Robert V. Denney	Sigma Deuteron (Nebraska), 1938	Federal Judge and Former Congressman, U.S. House of Representatives from Nebraska	
Joe Dini	Eta Deuteron (Nevada), 1950	Former Speaker, Nevada General Assembly, served a record 27 years in the Assembly. Served as Acting Governor of Nevada.	
Drew Edmondson	Epsilon Epsilon (Northeastern State), 1968	Attorney General of Oklahoma, 1995-2011 (16 years).	
Howard M. Gore	Delta (West Virginia), 1900	Former Governor of West Virginia; Former U.S. Sec. of Agriculture	
Gilbert Gude	Eta (Maryland) 1945	Former Congressman, U.S. House of Representatives from Maryland; Director, Congressional Research Service, Library of Congress.	
Edwin W. Higgins	Epsilon (Yale), 1897	Former Congressman, U.S. House of Representatives (R-CT).	
James Day Hodgson	Beta Deuteron (Minnesota) 1938	Former United States Ambassador to Japan; Former Secretary of Labor.	
John Kee	Delta (West Virginia), 1900	West Virginia State Senate 1923–1927. Former Congressman, U.S. House of Representatives from West Virginia from 1933 to 1951.	
Carleton King	Beta (Union), 1926	Former Congressman, U.S. House of Representatives from New York from 1961 to 1974.	
Phill Kline	Epsilon Iota (University of Central Missouri), 1982	Former Attorney General of Kansas, now Professor of Law at Liberty University. Former Kansas state legislator.	
Frank J. Lausche	Pi Deuteron (Ohio State), (honorary?)	Former Senator from Ohio; former Ohio governor	
Robert E. Leach	Pi Deuteron (Ohio State) 1933	Ohio Chief Justice.	
Arthur C. Levitt	Chi (Williams) 1952	Former Chairman of the United States Securities and Exchange Commission.	
Oren E. Long	Delta Deuteron (Michigan), (Honorary)	Governor of Hawaii at statehood, Senior Senator from Hawaii	
Donald H. McLean	Lambda (George Washington), 1906	Former Congressman, U.S. House of Representatives, in office from March 4, 1933 – January 3, 1945. He later served as a district judge.	
Earl C. Michener	Lambda (George Washington), 1903	Former Congressman, U.S. House of Representatives, in office for most of three decades, serving from March 4, 1919 to March 3, 1933, and again from January 3, 1935 to January 3, 1951.	
Matthew M. Neely	Delta (West Virginia), 1901	Former Congressman, U.S. House of Representatives (D-WV); Former Governor of West Virginia	
Keith Neville	Sigma (St. John's), 1905	Former Governor of Nebraska	
Fred D. Schwengel	Gamma Epsilon (Truman State), 1930	Former Congressman, U.S. House of Representatives from Iowa and one of the founding members and former president of the U.S. Capitol Historical Society. Former President, Phi Sigma Epsilon fraternity. The I-80 bridge spanning the Mississippi River between Iowa and Illinois is named in his honor.	
R. Smith Simpson	Psi (Virginia) 1927	American Consul in Bombay, India; research professor in diplomacy, Georgetown University; author of Anatomy of the State Department	
Robert Stivers	Phi Deuteron (Kentucky), 1983	Kentucky State Senator; Past Majority Floor Leader and now President of the Kentucky Senate	
John H. Sununu	Omicron (M.I.T) 1961	Former Governor of New Hampshire; Former White House Chief of Staff	
Leo A. Temmey	Beta Deuteron (Minnesota), 1915	Former Attorney General of South Dakota	
Charles L. Terry, Jr.	Psi (University of Virginia), 1922	Former Governor of Delaware	
John V. Tunney	Iota Pentaton (Cal. State/Fullerton) Honorary, 1970	United States Senator from California	
Robert F. Wagner	Zeta (CCNY), 1898	Former U.S. Senator (D-NY), Sponsor of the Wagner Act	
George M. Wallhauser	Mu (Penn), 1922	Former Congressman, U.S. House of Representatives from 1958 to 1965.	

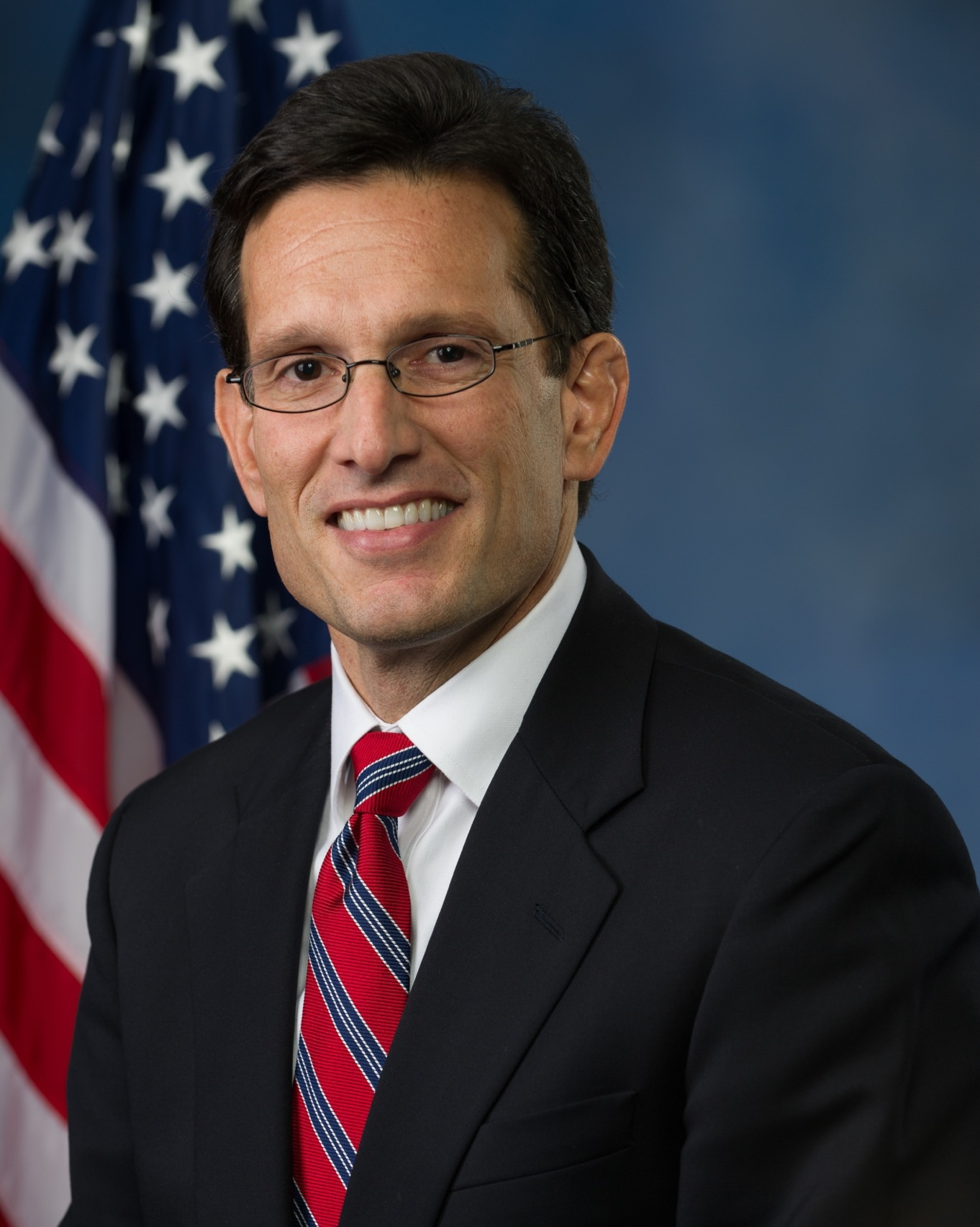
Eric Cantor, U.S. House

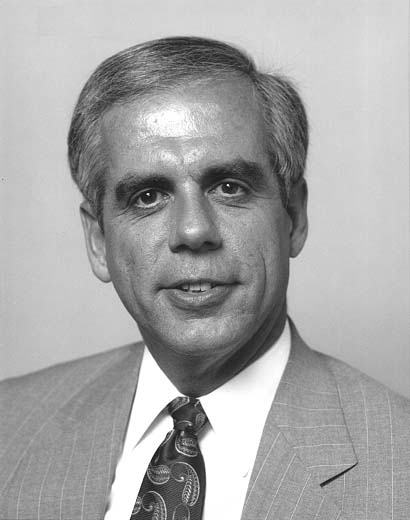
Tony Coelho, U.S. House

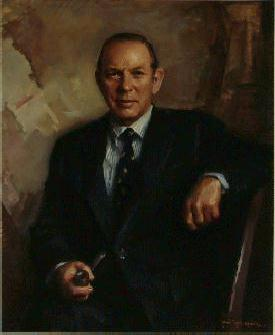
James Day Hodgson, Ambassador

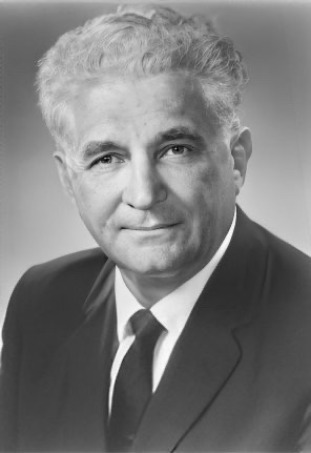
Frank J. Lausche, U.S. Senate

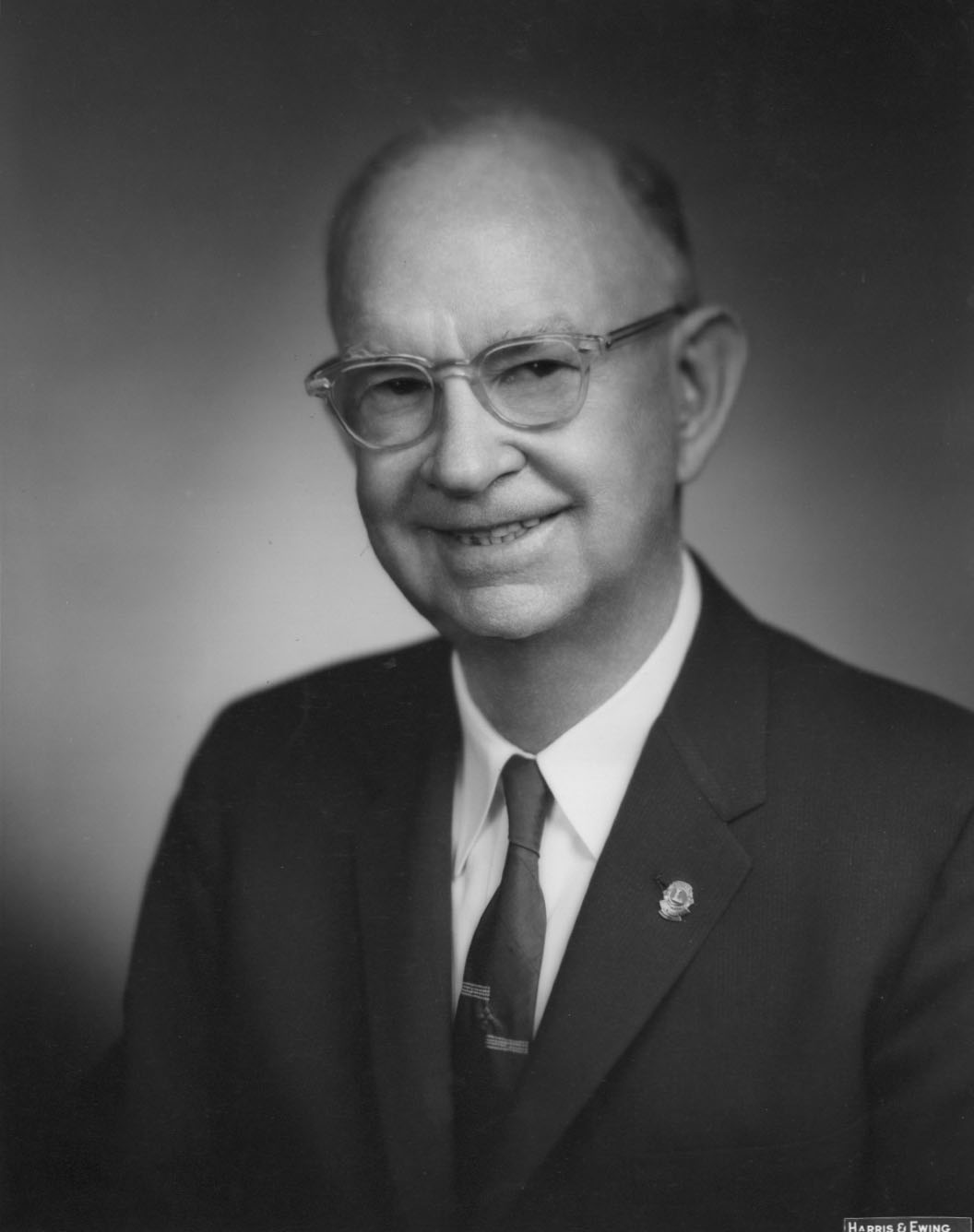
Oren Long, U.S. Senate

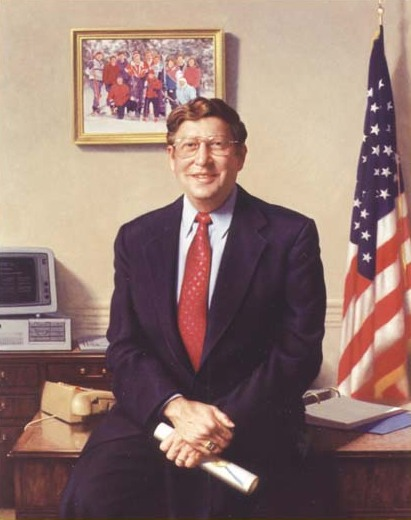
John H. Sununu, WH Chief of Staff

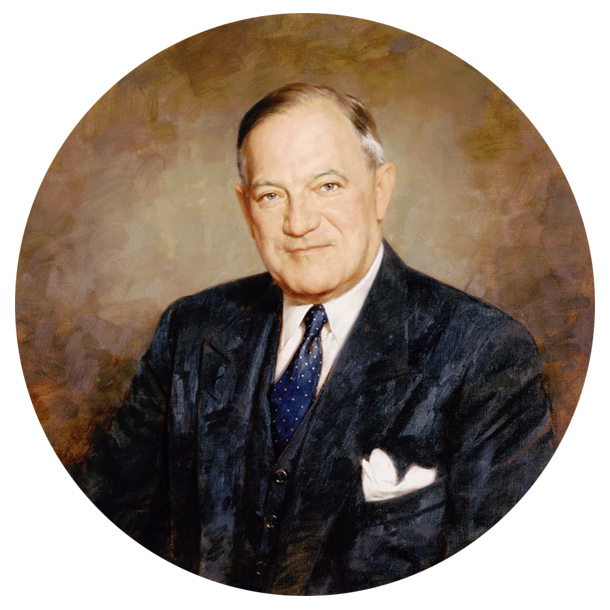
Robert Wagner, U.S. Senate

== Religion ==
Name	Original chapter	Notability	Ref.
Stewart W. Herman	Rho Deuteron (Gettysburg), 1930	President, Lutheran School of Theology, Chicago (Retired).	
Peter Popoff		televangelist, charlatan	

== Science and engineering ==
Name	Original chapter	Notability	Ref.
Daniel Brandenstein	Sigma Zeta (Wisconsin–River Falls) 1965	Retired captain, U.S.N.; former chief of the NASA Astronaut Office; veteran of four Space Shuttle missions	
M. Watt Espy	Omicron Deuteron (Alabama), 1957	Researcher and historian on capital punishment in America, co-author with John Ortiz Smykla of The Espy Files, a database of executions carried out in the United States and preceding territories from 1608. This database is the most complete source of data on the issue, identifying 15,487 people put to death.	
John M. Fabian	Chi Deuteron (Washington State) 1961	Former NASA astronaut; veteran of two Space Shuttle missions.	
Richard F. Gordon Jr.	Lambda Deuteron (Washington) 1951	Retired captain, U.S.N.; NASA astronaut, missions: Gemini 11 and Apollo 12.	
Milton Harris	Theta Deuteron (Oregon State) 1926	President, American Institute of Chemists, former vice-president for research and development, the Gillette Company.	
J. Walter Larkin	Tau (Dartmouth) 1924	President, Osteopathic College of Ophthalmology, 1959.	
Charles C. Price	Phi (Swarthmore) 1934	winner of the 1974 American Chemical Society Award for Creative Invention of polyether polyurethane rubber,	
Harry Steenbock	Zeta Deuteron (Wisconsin) 1916	Professor of biochemistry at Wisconsin. Invented the process of irradiation with ultraviolet light to increase the amount of Vitamin D in foods and other organic materials. Most notably used in milk. Credited with the elimination of the disease of rickets in the U.S. by 1945. Steenbock Memorial Library is named in his honor.	
John W. Townsend Jr.	Chi (Williams), 1946	6th director of the NASA Goddard Space Flight Center; President, the Fairchild Space & Electronics Co.; aerospace engineer who contributed to the development of the United States space program	

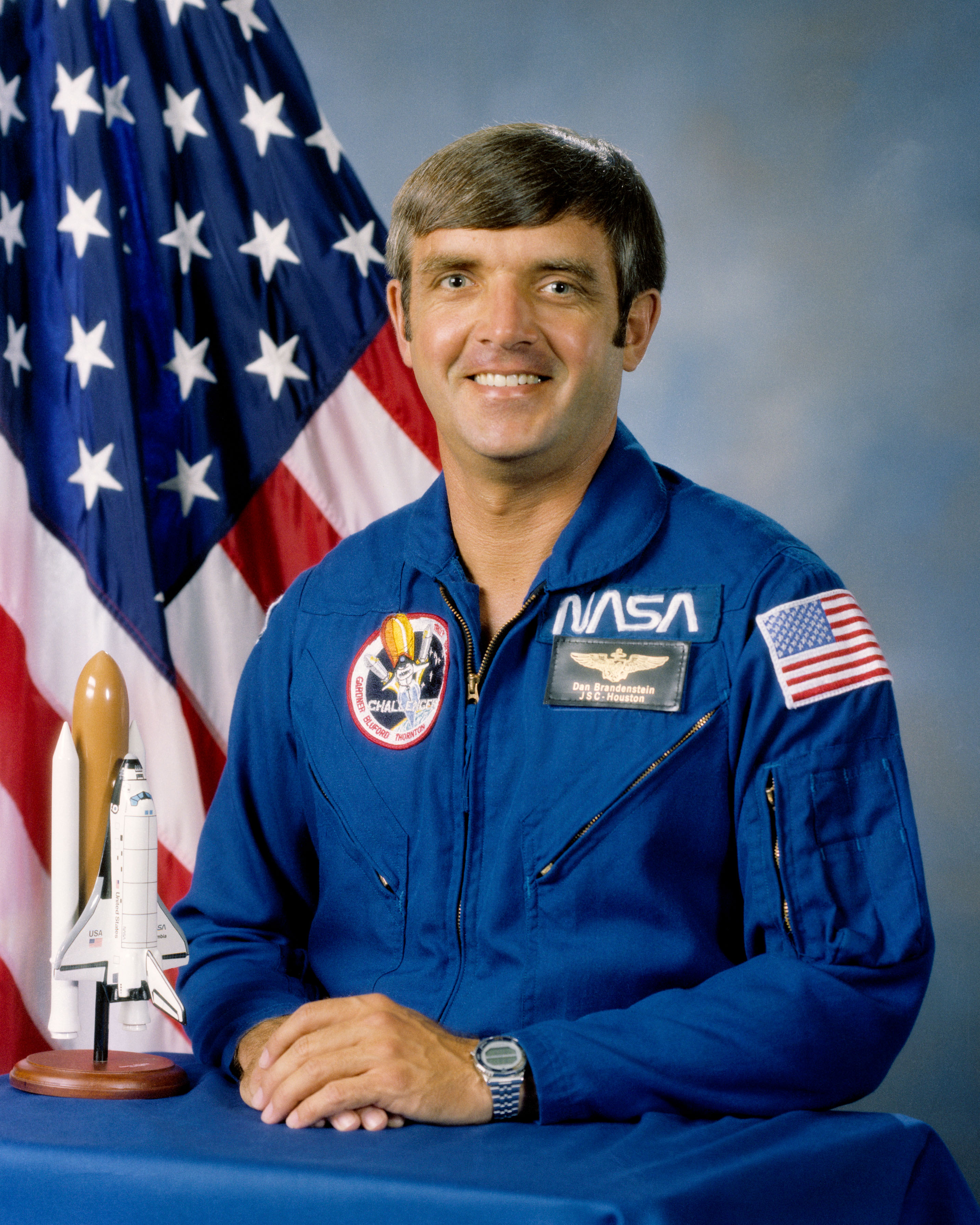
Daniel Brandenstein, astronaut

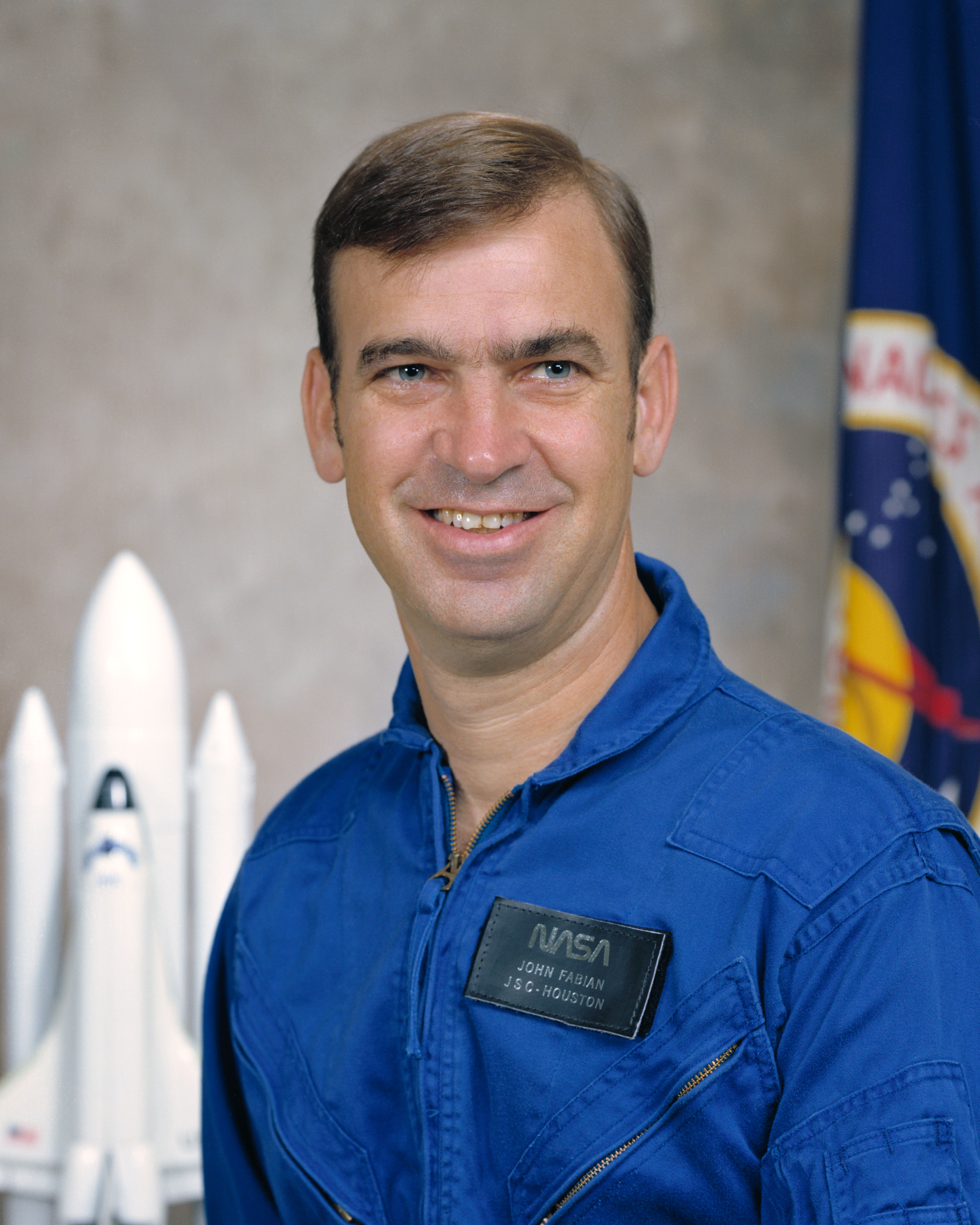
John M. Fabian, astronaut

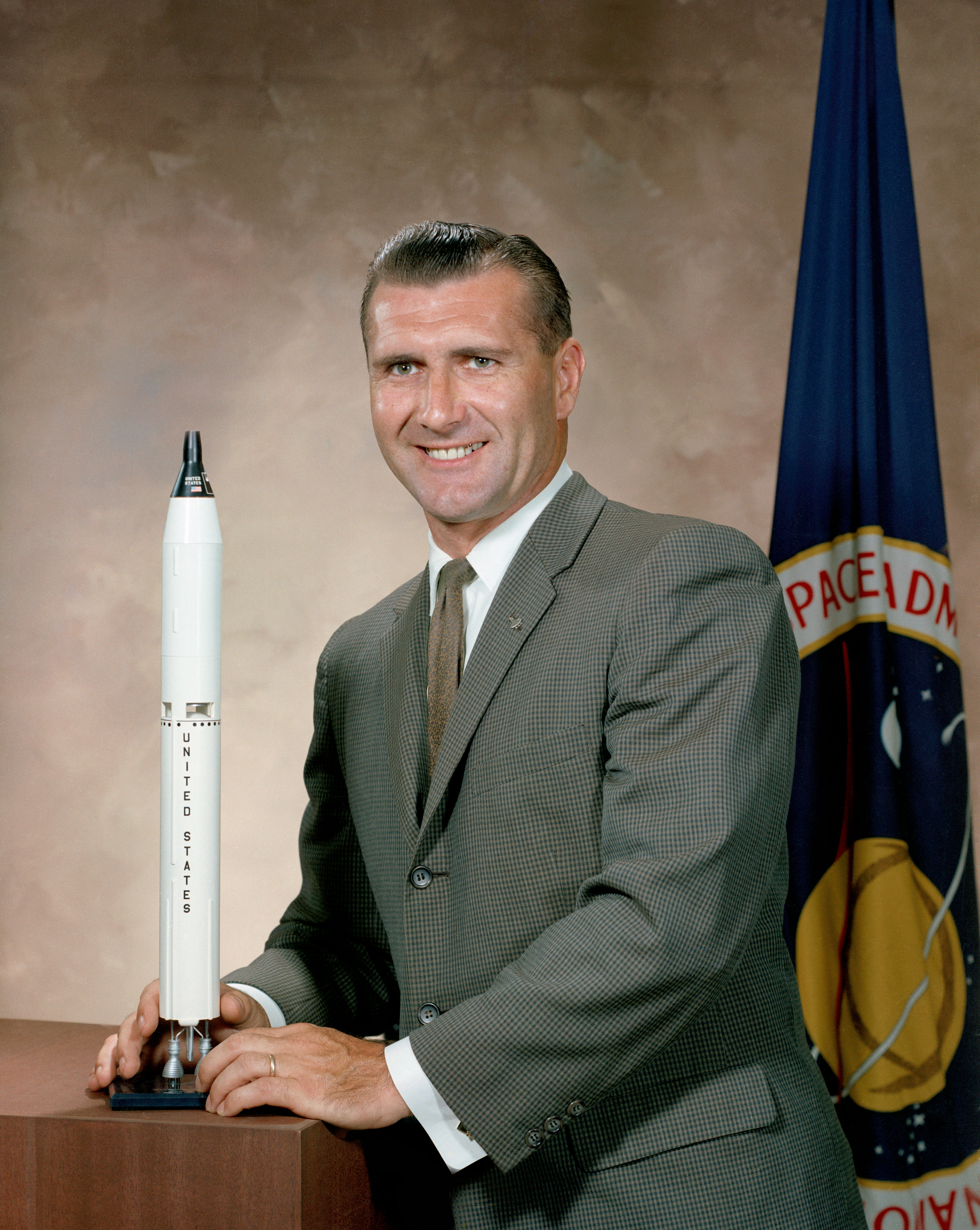
Richard F. Gordon, Jr., astronaut

== Sports ==
Name	Original chapter	Notability	Ref.
Jack Albright	Omega (California), 1943	Major League Baseball shortstop with the Philadelphia Phillies, playing in 1947, having joined the team after his service in the US Navy.	
Jim Anderson	Theta Deuteron (Oregon State), 1959	Head Coach, Men's Basketball at Oregon State University. Named the Pac-10 Coach of the Year and led the Beavers to the 1990 NCAA Division I men's basketball tournament, the school's last NCAA Tournament appearance until 2015.	
Elden Auker	Iota Deuteron (Kansas State), 1932	Major League Baseball right-handed pitcher, noted for his submarine pitching style. Played for the Detroit Tigers and St. Louis Browns. College All-American in football, basketball, and baseball.	
Nate Barragar	Omega Deuteron (Southern California), 1930	Collegiate and Professional Football player for USC and the Green Bay Packers. All-American at USC in 1929 and an All-Pro for the Packers (1931- 32, 1934- 35), position was offensive lineman. USC Trojans were national champions in 1928, while the Packers were NFL champions in 1931. Began a lengthy film career while playing football.	
Bert Baston	Beta Deuteron (Minnesota), 1917	All-American football player at the University of Minnesota, elected to the College Football Hall of Fame in 1954. Awarded the Navy Cross in WWI for extraordinary heroism in action as a U.S. Marine near Château-Thierry, France, later returning to service as a Colonel in WWII.	
Ray Blemker	Kappa Deuteron (Georgia Tech), 1959	Major League Baseball pitcher with the Kansas City Athletics, playing in 1960, with a combined 4-year career in the Athletics' organization.	
Lou Boudreau	Alpha Deuteron (Illinois), 1939	Major League Baseball shortstop with the Cleveland Indians, 1948 American League MVP, World Series champion in 1948, 8-time All-Star; team manager, later career stops with the Boston Red Sox, Kansas City Athletics and Chicago Cubs. Sports Announcer; Member of the Baseball Hall of Fame.	
Harold Bradley	Nu Triton (Hartwick), 1934	Head basketball coach at Duke, 1950–59. Head basketball coach at Texas, 1959–67. Lifetime .658 winning percentage. Earned ACC Coach of the Year honor in 1959.	
Alfred L. Buser	Zeta Deuteron (Wisconsin), 1912	All-American football player, head coach of the University of Florida football Gators.	
Johnny Cain	Omicron Deuteron (Alabama), 1933	Played college football at the University of Alabama, three-time All-American and member of the 1930 national championship team that won the Rose Bowl. Head football coach at the University of Louisiana at Lafayette from 1937 to 1941 and in 1946.	
Bruce Craddock	Gamma Epsilon (Truman State), 1966	Head Coach, Men's Football at Western Illinois University, 1983-89. Marine Captain, serving in Vietnam from 1967 to 1970. Assistant Coach at Northwest Missouri State (now Truman) from 1970 to 1972. Assistant coach at the University of Vermont from 1972 to 1974, returning to a similar role at Northeast Missouri from 1975 to 1978 before briefly assuming head coaching duties there. Guest coach for the Saskatchewan Roughriders of the Canadian Football League from 1979 to 1982. He returned to the U.S. when he was named head coach for the Western Illinois University Leathernecks in 1982. Earned several citations as "Coach of the Year" by the Gateway Conference, Kodak Midwest I-AA, and Missouri Intercollegiate Athletic Association.	
Michael Eaves	Phi Deuteron (Kentucky), 1994	NBA broadcaster. Sports Reporter for Fox Sports, former Clippers Courtside and California Sports Report anchor, Sports anchor for Al Jazeera America.	
Harry Elliott	Beta Deuteron (Minnesota), 1950	Major League Baseball outfielder who appeared in 92 games during the 1953 and 1955 seasons with the St. Louis Cardinals. Held the Big Ten batting championship. Taught high school physical education for many years in El Cajon, California.	
Dick Enberg	Epsilon Xi (Central Michigan), 1956	Nationally known NBC Sportscaster.	
Dwain Farmer	Omicron Tetarton (Tennessee Wesleyan), 1958	Athletic Director and Head Coach, Men's Basketball, Tennessee Wesleyan Bulldogs. Dwain Farmer Court on the TWU campus is named for him, as is a charitable golf tourney held annually by the school. Farmer was inducted into the TWU Hall of Fame in November 1985. He was honored by election into the NAIA Hall of Fame for his coaching success in March 1986, winning his 500th coaching career basketball victory in February of that year.	
James Franklin	Beta Pentaton (East Stroudsburg), 1995	Head Football Coach, Virginia Tech. Former head coach, Vanderbilt University and Penn State University. Selected as the Dave McClain Coach of the Year (Big Ten Coach of the Year) in Nov. 2016 by the media. Collegiate standout, setting seven school records as quarterback and noted as a Division II Player of the Year finalist for 1994.	
George Freese	Delta (West Virginia), 1950	Major League baseball Third Baseman with the Detroit Tigers, Pittsburgh Pirates and Chicago Cubs, playing from 1953 to 1961.	
Frank Gifford	Omega Deuteron (USC), 1952	NFL New York Giants football star, playing halfback and flanker. As a collegiate athlete, named a football All-American. All-NFL first team six times over his 12-year playing career, appearing in three NFL championship games including the 1956 Super Bowl. That same year he was named the league's most valuable player. He retired from active play to become a renowned sportscaster known as the voice of Monday Night Football in a broadcast career lasting 27 years. He was voted into the NFL Hall of Fame in 1977, winning a broadcasting Emmy Award that same year.	
Bryan Glazer	Epsilon Triton (American) 1986 and 1989, respectively	Owner, Tampa Bay Buccaneers, joint-Chairmen, Manchester United Football Club	
Joel Glazer	Epsilon Triton (American) 1986 and 1989, respectively	Owner, Tampa Bay Buccaneers, joint-Chairmen, Manchester United Football Club	
Dick Harlow	Kappa (Penn State), 1912	Head football coach at Pennsylvania State University (1915–1917), Colgate University (1922–1925), McDaniel College (1926–1934), and Harvard University (1935–1942, 1945–1947), compiling a career college football record of 149–69–17. Pioneered modern defensive schemes, utilizing shifts, reverses, and lateral passes. Inducted into the College Football Hall of Fame as a coach in 1954.	
Jim Hickey	Zeta Pentaton (Pan American), 1984	Major League baseball Pitching Coach for the Tampa Bay Rays for eleven seasons, adding a year with the Chicago Cubs in 2018. During his senior year of college, his 16 victories led the entire NCAA, earning him first-team All-American status in 1983. Prior to coaching, he had a lengthy minor league playing career with several teams.	
Pete Mauthe	Kappa (Penn State), 1913	College Football All-American, four-year letterman for the Nittany Lions, as fullback; elected to College Football Hall of Fame in 1957. Captain of undefeated 1912 squad. Professionally, he was president of Youngstown Sheet and Tube Company during WWII, one of the largest steel companies in the world. See listing under Business and Industry.	
Justin McCarthy	Alpha (Massachusetts), 1921	American ice hockey player who competed in the 1924 Winter Olympics, at Chamonix, France. He was the captain of the American ice hockey team, which won the silver medal.	
Mike Miller	Phi Eta (Clarion), 1992	Collegiate and Professional Football coach. Several roles with the Arizona Cardinals: wide receivers coach (2007-2008), passing game coordinator (2009-2010), offensive coordinator (2011-2012). Earlier tenure as coach for the Pittsburgh Steelers, Buffalo Bills, along with Canadian and European teams.	
Rick Minter	Epsilon Rho (Henderson State), 1976	Collegiate and Professional Football coach, University of Cincinnati head coach (1994-2003), Philadelphia Eagles linebackers coach (2013-2016), earlier tenure with Louisiana Tech, Arkansas, NC State, New Mexico State, Ball State, Notre Dame, South Carolina, Marshall, Indiana State and Kentucky.	
David P. Montgomery	Mu (Penn), 1968	Major League baseball team President, Philadelphia Phillies.	
Ed Ott	Nu Tetarton (Rutgers), 1972	Major League Baseball catcher and coach. Played for the Pittsburgh Pirates and California Angels between 1974 and 1981. 1979 World Series Champion.	
Donn Pall	Alpha Deuteron (Illinois), 1984	Major League Baseball pitcher from 1988 to 1998. Nicknamed "The Pope," he had multi-year stints with the Chicago White Sox and Florida Marlins, with shorter stays with the Philadelphia Phillies, the New York Yankees, and the Chicago Cubs. He transitioned to a front office role, working for the White Sox.	
Dan Patrick	Eta Hexaton (Dayton), 1979	Sports broadcaster, Sportscenter anchor, ESPN Sports Network	
David Poile	Delta Pentaton (Northeastern University), 1971	General Manager, first of the NHL's Washington Capitals, currently with the Nashville Predators. General Manager, U.S. National Team in 1998 and 1999 for the International Ice Hockey Federation's World Championships, and served as General Manager for the US 2014 Olympic team until their departure to Sochi (a late injury sidelined him). Inducted into the U.S. Hockey Hall of Fame in 2018. Led the Predators to the Stanley Cup Finals in 2017. Achieved the most wins in NHL history as of 1 Mar 2018 with his 1,320 wins, a win record that continues to grow (1,380 as of May 2019).	
Frank Pond	Beta Deuteron (Minnesota), 1923	Head coach, University of Minnesota Gopher Hockey, 1930–35. Captain of the varsity team in 1922–23. University of Minnesota hockey "Frank R. Pond Rookie of the Year" award is named in his honor.	
Dennis Ralston	Omega Deuteron (USC), 1964	World Team tennis pro; Men's and NCAA champion; Tennis Coach, SMU.	
Jay Rhodemyre	Phi Deuteron (Kentucky), 1948	NFL center and collegiate football star. MVP of the 1948 College Football All-Star Team, drafted that year in the 7th round by the Green Bay Packers, for whom he played four years at Center.	
Buck Rogers	Psi (Virginia), 1934	Major League Baseball pitcher with the Washington Senators, playing in the 1935 season.	
Red Rolfe	Tau (Dartmouth), 1931	Major League Baseball third baseman, manager and front-office executive. Anchored the New York Yankees 1930's dynasty. 5-time World Series Champion, 4-time All Star. Named baseball and basketball coach at Yale in 1943, later coached the Yankees, and was named manager for the Detroit Tigers, where he won AL Manager of the Year in 1950. He completed a long career as Athletic Director at Dartmouth, retiring in 1968.	
Richard Joel Russell	Omega (California), 1919	Dean of the Graduate School of Louisiana State University	
George Savitsky	Mu (Penn), 1947	Played college football at the University of Pennsylvania, where he was a football All-American all four years. He was drafted by the Philadelphia Eagles in 1947, played a year to raise funds for dental school, and had a career as an oral surgeon.	
Vic Sears	Theta Deuteron (Oregon State), 1941	Football offensive lineman for the Philadelphia Eagles. Played college football at Oregon State, drafted in the fifth round of the 1941 NFL Draft by the Pittsburgh Steelers. Sears is a member of the NFL's 1940s All-Decade Team.	
Chris Schenkel	Delta Triton (Purdue), 1945	Nationally known Sportscaster.	
Ernie Smith	Omega Deuteron (USC), 1933	Football offensive tackle at USC. Named unanimous choice as All-American in 1932. His USC teams won the college football national championships in 1931 and 1932. Played professionally from 1935 to 1939 for the Green Bay Packers. Named to the Pro Bowl in 1939. NFL champion in 1936 and 1939. He was elected to the College Football Hall of Fame in 1970.	
George F. Veenker	Xi (St. Lawrence), 1916	Head basketball coach at the University of Michigan from 1928 to 1931. Served as an assistant football coach at Michigan from 1926 to 1929. From 1931 to 1936, he was the head football coach at Iowa State College (now known as Iowa State University). Athletic director at Iowa State from 1933 to 1945. Veenker Memorial Golf Course on the Iowa State campus is named in his honor.	
George Vukovich	Kappa Tetarton (Southern Illinois), 1978	Major League Baseball outfielder. Played six seasons from 1980 to 1985 for the Philadelphia Phillies and Cleveland Indians. Played two seasons in Japan for the Seibu Lions in 1986 and 1987. 1980 World Series Champion with the Phillies.	

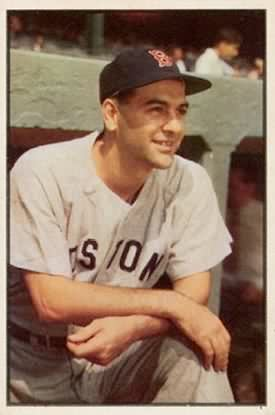
Lou Boudreau, baseball

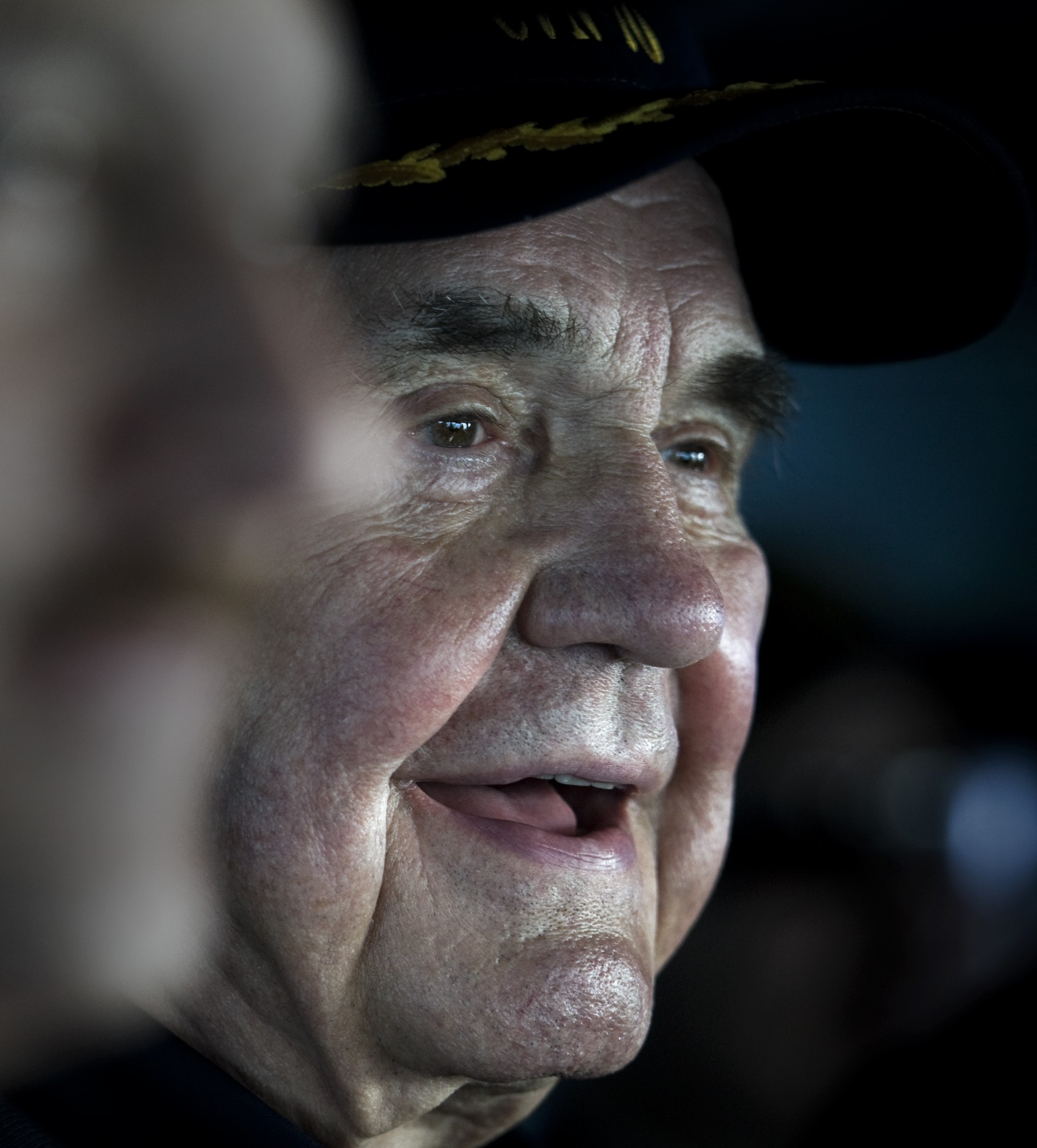
Dick Enberg, NBC, CBS, ESPN

"Pete" Mauthe, All-American

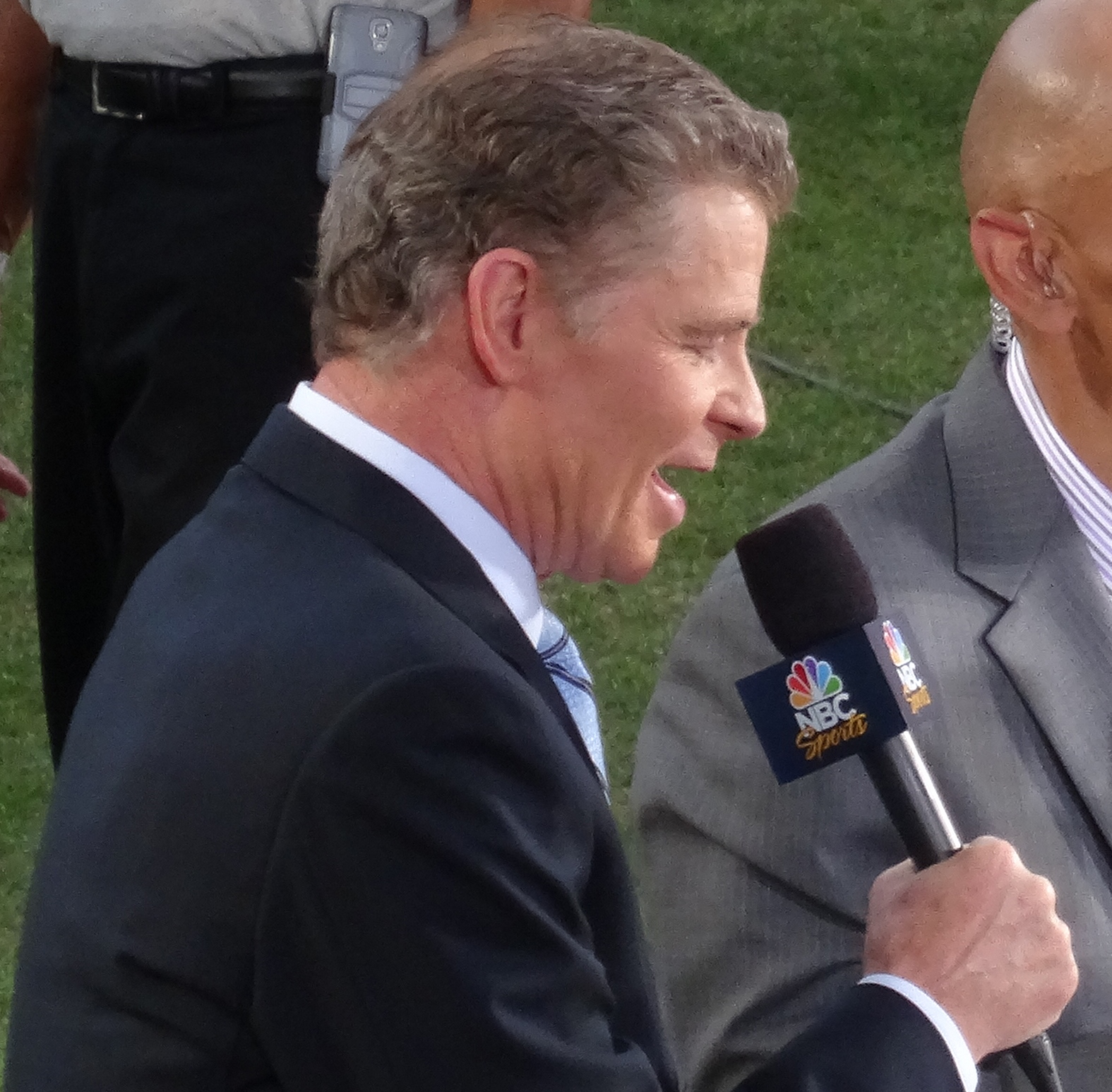
Dan Patrick, ESPN

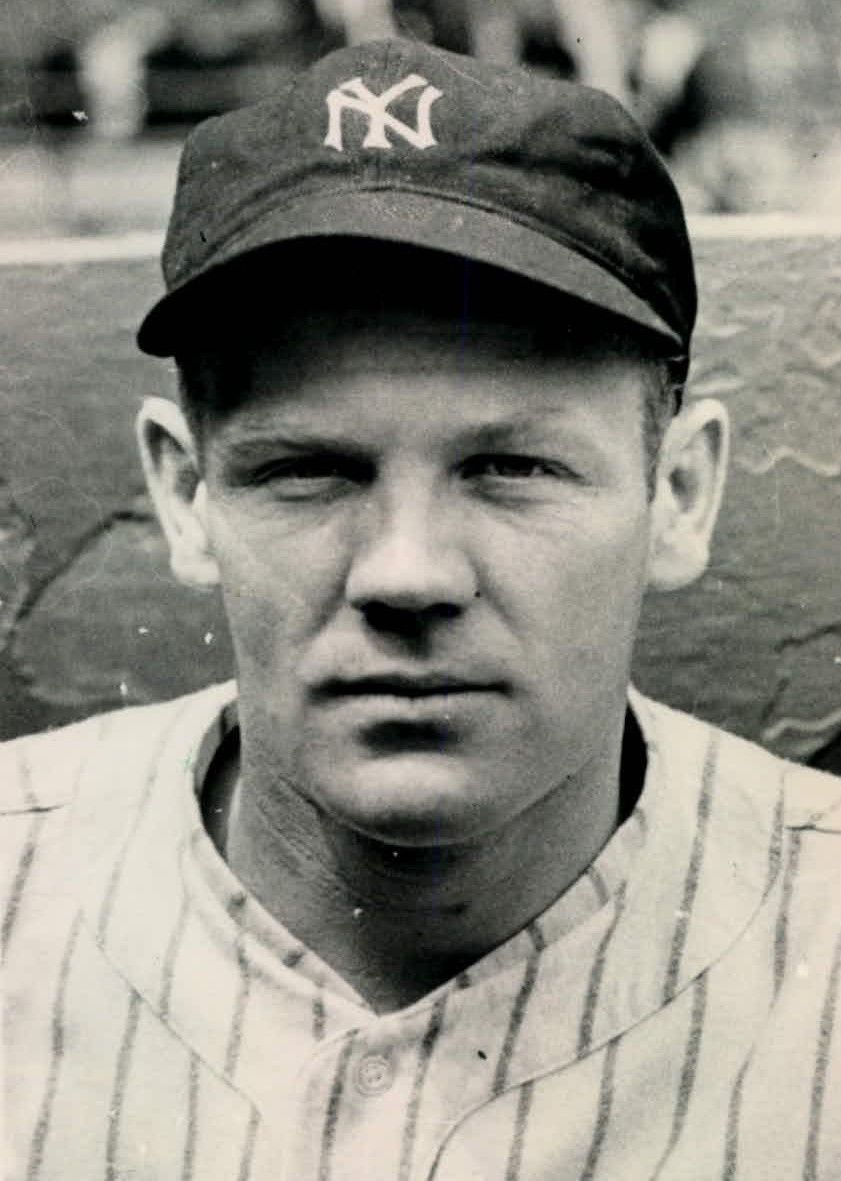
Red Rolf, baseball

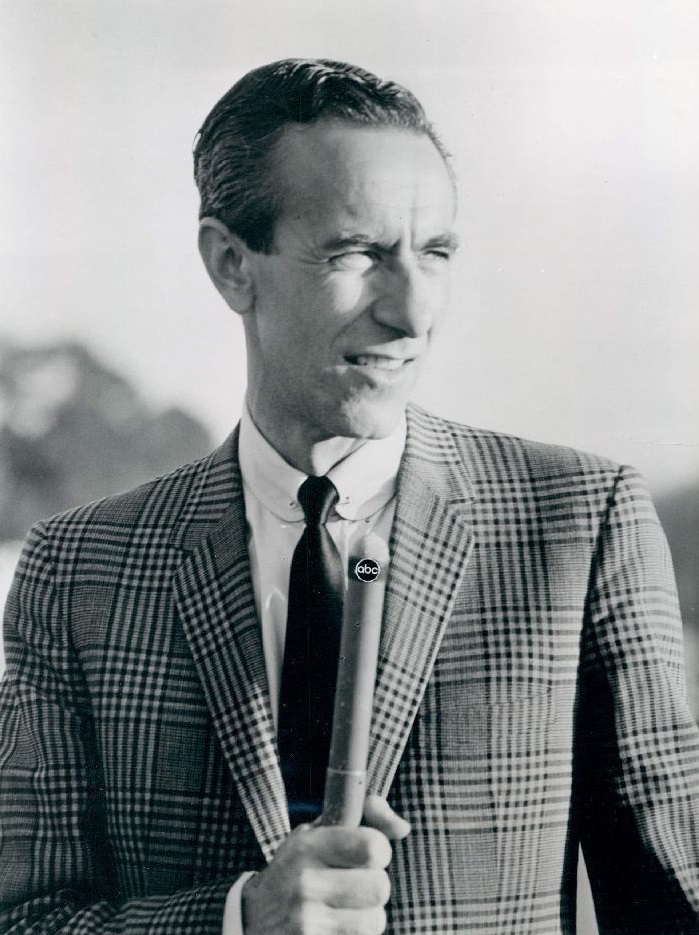
Chris Schenkel, ABC
