= Henry Hague =

American priest and fraternity founder (1849–1914)

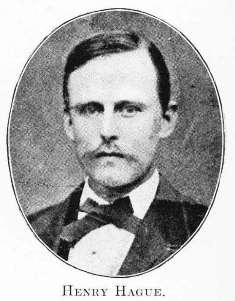
- Rev. Henry Hague
- Born: April 4, 1849; Ashton-Under-Lyne, England
- Died: April 25, 1914 (aged 65); Worcester, Massachusetts, United States
- Citizenship: American
- Education: Massachusetts Agricultural College (UMass)
- Employer(s): Episcopal Diocese, Massachusetts

The Rev. Henry Hague (1849–1914) was an English-born American Episcopal priest who was one of six founders of Phi Sigma Kappa fraternity in 1873.

== Early life ==
Henry A. Hague was born in England in the village of Ashton-Under-Lyne, now a suburb of Manchester. He had seen and explored much prior to the day Phi Sigma Kappa began. "He had worked as a factory hand, sailor and carpenter before deciding to return to further his education at college. He even served under Admiral Farragut at the end of the Civil War." (p. 17) He was a Freemason, having joined that Order prior to his coming to Amherst. Although Hague became a popular speaker, early in life he was known to have troubles pronouncing his h’s.

Setting aside his previous adventures, Hague enrolled as a student in the agricultural college to study religion, and, as fate would have it, he worked for the church much of his life. Slightly older than his peers when he entered college at Massachusetts Agricultural College, "Aggie," he was already twenty-four by the start of his sophomore year. He proved an auspicious student; Hague graduated as the fourth ranking student in 1875, his senior year, placing behind three other Phi Sigs.

== Collegiate activities ==
Like many of his fellow Founders, Hague participated in an array of collegiate activities.

He was the most outwardly devotional. Hague's fellow Founder Brooks reported long after that it was he who converted Hague from his native Methodism to the Episcopal fold by showing him around among the "particularly shabby Methodist churches" in his own home neighborhood. (p. 20) Records indicate that Hague seems to have been the only one of the group to belong to the College's Christian Union, but he held many offices therein.

While at Aggie, Hague was a member of the Washington Irving Literary Society, a popular pastime among the undergraduates. He was a member of the Gymnastic Association, and like others of the Fraternity's Founders held the military rank of lieutenant in the College's Battalion. He was a member of the class crew (rowing team) and an officer in the Naval Association. Hague was known to keep a pot of hot water for tea on his stove, the unpolished state of which got him into occasional trouble with his military inspector. He was a right-fielder on the college nine-man baseball team. Hague also managed the popular college store, along with his friend and fellow Founder, Brooks. His peers honored Hague by election as captain of his class.

His role as a Founder of Phi Sigma Kappa fraternity in his Sophomore year is particularly noted today.

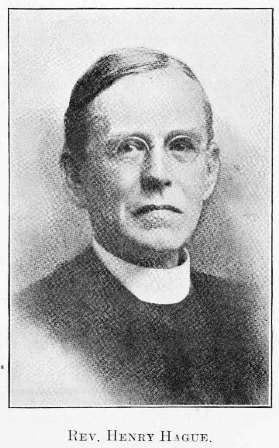
Rev. Henry Hague, Jan 1910 Signet, 50 years old.

== Later years ==
Upon graduation, Hague completed seminary and was appointed as rector of St. Matthew's Episcopal Church in Worcester, Massachusetts. He served in that capacity for thirty-two years. He was also dean of the Worcester convocation.

Hague was married in 1879 to Harriet Davis. They had four sons, Robert, Edwin, Cuthbert and Henry. Cuthbert later attended nearby Amherst College (not to be confused with M.A.C.), and became a member of Phi Delta Theta.

He corresponded regularly with fraternity leaders, and while not able to assist in an administrative function, nevertheless he remained interested and engaged in the fraternity all his life.

Hague attended an initiation banquet for Phi Sigma Kappa in Amherst the winter before his death.

Hague provided the words of a fitting benediction as he reflected in 1885 on the continuing growth of his Fraternity:

"After more or less talk, the suggestions, most of them very good, took shape, and Phi Sigma Kappa was the result. Only as yet, however, in embryo, the seed grew, and little by little the goodly child of today is the fruit. Let us trust it to keep on growing till it shall become a full grown man, having the strength to help and protect its members, wisdom to guide them to helpful and good things as to college life, and love so warm that all its members shall feel its kindly glow, that brotherly love may indeed be a reality and not an idea". (p.25)

Rev. Hague died in Worcester at the age of 65 on April 25, 1914.
