= Sigma Phi Sigma =

Defunct American collegiate fraternity

- ΣΦΣ
- Founded: April 13, 1908; 118 years ago University of Pennsylvania
- Type: Social
- Affiliation: Independent ?
- Status: Defunct
- Defunct date: 1947
- Successor: Phi Sigma Kappa and scattered
- Scope: National
- Member badge
- Colors: Yellow and White
- Flower: Lilies of the Valley and Jonquil
- Publication: The Sigma Phi Sigma Monad
- Chapters: 18
- Headquarters: United States

Sigma Phi Sigma (ΣΦΣ) was an American national collegiate fraternity founded in 1908 at the University of Pennsylvania. It ceased operations during WWII and was unable to restart as a national entity, with several chapters joining other fraternities, predominantly Phi Sigma Kappa.

== History ==
Sigma Phi Sigma was founded as a social, academic fraternity at the University of Pennsylvania on 13 April 1908. The Founders were Brice Hayden Long, Guy Park Needham, and Percy Hollinshed Wood.

From the start, leaders cited an early aspiration of national expansion. Efforts were concentrated on formation of chapters at larger institutions, mostly state universities or large private schools. Some of these chapters entered into successful building projects. By the early 1930s it had achieved a chapter roll of eighteen, what appears to be its high water mark, but there were rumblings that this was insufficient to support its national functions during the Great Depression and WWII. Just four of its chapters re-opened after the war, and due to the fraternity's inability to re-ignite operations elsewhere, the majority of these, and scattered alumni from other chapters, sought new national allegiances.

== Demise ==
The Sigma Phi Sigma house at Oregon State, 1923

The Fraternity's disintegration began as early as 1941, when the University of Maryland chapter withdrew to become a chapter of Sigma Chi. Cornell's chapter closed that same year, with most of its members joining Tau Kappa Epsilon.

The fraternity formally voted for dissolution at its 21st and last grand assembly in January 1947 at a convention in Berkeley, California.

Immediately after the vote to dissolve in 1947, the University of California chapter merged into the re-established Phi Sigma Kappa chapter on that campus, with the provision that any other member of Sigma Phi Sigma from other chapters might also join Phi Sigma Kappa. Following their lead, most of the brothers from the former University of Nevada and University of Wisconsin chapters similarly sought safe harbor in Phi Sigma Kappa, and participated in restoring those chapters as they rebuilt operations. Phi Sigma Kappa's Wisconsin chapter had been dormant since 1931, thus the infusion of new members coming from Sigma Phi Sigma was able to re-start that chapter.

The University of Oregon chapter became a unit of Phi Kappa Psi, and the University of Illinois chapter merged operations with Tau Kappa Epsilon there. One final chapter, at Penn State University, lingered as an independent local for another decade, retaining the name Sigma Phi Sigma. In 1954 it was installed as a charge (~chapter) of Theta Delta Chi.

The 1991 edition of Baird's Manual noted the Society had 4,500 initiates at dissolution.

== Chapters ==
The Fraternity established chapters at eighteen schools. Chapters that accepted some form of merger by the 1947 dissolution are noted in bold, dormant chapters or those with unknown resolution are noted in italics.

Chapter	Installed Date and Range	University	State	Status	Ref.
**Alpha**	April 13, 1908–1938	University of Pennsylvania	Philadelphia, Pennsylvania	Merged (**ΣΦΕ**)	
**Beta**	May 24, 1919–May 22, 1954	Penn State University	University Park, Pennsylvania	Merged (**ΘΔΧ**)	
**Gamma**	1910–1941	Cornell University	Ithaca, New York	Merged (**ΤΚΕ**)	
**Delta**	March 4, 1916–1941	University of Maryland	College Park, Maryland	Merged (**ΣΧ**)	
**Epsilon**	1916–1947	University of California	Berkeley, California	Merged (**ΦΣΚ**)	
**Zeta**	1919–1947	University of Illinois	Champaign and Urbana, Illinois	Merged (**ΤΚΕ**)	
Eta	1921–1934	University of Maine	Orono, Maine	Alumni Merged (**ΤΚΕ**)	
**Theta**	1922–1942	University of Nevada	Reno, Nevada	Merged (**ΦΣΚ**)	
**Iota**	1923–1948	Oregon State University	Corvallis, Oregon	Merged (**ΦΚΥ**)	
Kappa	1924–1933	Auburn University	Auburn, Alabama	Alumni Merged (**ΤΚΕ**)	(Note: This school's name was Alabama Polytechnic until 1960.)
Lambda	1924–1932	University of Missouri	Columbia, Missouri	Alumni Merged (**ΤΚΕ**)	
**Mu**	1924–1935	University of Wisconsin	Madison, Wisconsin	Merged (**ΦΣΚ**)	
**Nu**	1924–1932	Ohio State University	Columbus, Ohio	Merged (**ΦΣΚ**)	
Xi	1925–1933	University of North Carolina	Chapel Hill, North Carolina	Alumni Merged (**ΦΣΚ**)	
Omicron	1928–1933	University of Nebraska	Lincoln, Nebraska	Alumni Merged (**ΦΣΚ**)	
Pi	1928–1936	University of Washington	Seattle, Washington	Alumni Merged (**ΦΣΚ**)	
Rho	1928–1936	Washington State University	Pullman, Washington	Alumni Merged (**ΦΣΚ**)	
Sigma	March 1929–May 1934	Brown University	Providence, Rhode Island	Withdrew	

== Publications and Traditions ==
The Fraternity published a magazine, called the Sigma Phi Sigma Monad.

Its badge was the three Greek letters of its name, with the Phi superimposed on the two Sigmas. The Phi was set with fifteen pearls, or in some cases, with diamonds.

The fraternity's colors were yellow and white. Its flowers were Lilies of the Valley and the Jonquil.

The fraternity's song was Come Ye Sons Who Wear the Gold and White.

Government was managed by convention, held biannually.
