= Phi Sigma Kappa =

North American collegiate fraternity

- ΦΣΚ
- Founded: March 15, 1873; 153 years ago Massachusetts Agricultural College
- Type: Social
- Affiliation: NIC
- Status: Active
- Scope: International
- Motto: "Do unto others as you would have them do unto you"
- Pillars: Brotherhood, Scholarship, Character
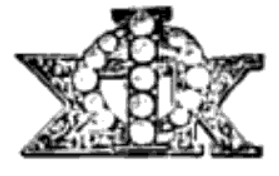
- Member badge
- Colors: Cardinal Red and Silver
- Symbol: Triple T's
- Flag
- Flower: Red carnation and White tea rose
- Mascot: Owl
- Publication: The Signet
- Chapters: 77 active
- Headquarters: 2925 East 96th Street; Indianapolis, Indiana 46240; United States
- Website: www.phisigmakappa.org

Phi Sigma Kappa (ΦΣΚ), colloquially known as Phi Sig or PSK, is a men's social and academic fraternity with approximately 74 active chapters and provisional chapters in North America. Most of its first two dozen chapters were granted to schools in New England, New York, and Pennsylvania; therefore its early development was strongly Eastern in character, eventually operating chapters at six of the eight Ivy League schools as well as more egalitarian state schools. It later expanded to the South and West. The fraternity has initiated more than 180,000 members since 1873.

According to its Constitution, Phi Sigma Kappa is devoted to the promotion of its three Cardinal Principles: the "Promotion of Brotherhood", the "Stimulation of Scholarship", and the "Development of Character".

Phi Sigma Kappa began on March 15, 1873, at Massachusetts Agricultural College in Amherst (now the University of Massachusetts Amherst) by six sophomores (referred to as The Founders). Phi Sigma Epsilon merged with Phi Sigma Kappa in 1985, which was the largest merger of Greek-letter fraternities.

== History ==
=== Founding ===
Massachusetts Agricultural College in Amherst, now the University of Massachusetts Amherst, was the setting for the founding of Phi Sigma Kappa. Among its other students in the early 1870s, it had attracted six men of varied backgrounds, ages, abilities, and goals in life who saw the need for a new and different kind of society on campus. Early members recalled that it was Henry Hague who suggested that, since the six were close and were not interested in either of the two local fraternities on campus, they create their own. The six sophomores, meeting in Old North Hall, banded together during the summer of 1873 to form a "society to promote morality, learning and social culture."

The six Founders of Phi Sigma Kappa were:

- Jabez William Clay
- Joseph Francis Barrett
- Henry Hague
- Xenos Young Clark
- Frederick George Campbell
- William Penn Brooks

The six were active college students, members of literary and academic societies and athletic groups, and editors of campus publications. Three were military lieutenants and Brooks was a captain. Hague and Brooks even ran the college store. Academic leaders as well, "it cannot be too strongly stressed that these men were the best students in [the] college." On March 15, 1873, the Founders met in secret. Brooks already had prepared a constitution and symbolism, and Hague had designed a ritual. The first meeting seemed destined to succeed, for the individuals all had done their work well. The ritual has been changed only six times since, and never drastically. The symbolism and esoteric structure have never been altered. Clay was elected president of the group—which for its first five years had no name. Its cryptic characters could not be pronounced, either, though Brooks recalled that outsiders referred to them as "T, double T, T upside-down."

=== Grand Chapter ===
The Grand Chapter of Phi Sigma Kappa was organized in 1878, five years after the founding of Alpha chapter, to tie alumni and undergraduates into a continuing relationship. Charles Sumner Howe, an 1876 initiate, was elected its first Grand President (at the age of 20). Phi Sigma Kappa was adopted as the group's official name that same year after four years of debate and the work of seven committees.

=== Expansion ===
Originally, only one chapter was contemplated by the founders. Although the germ of expansion arrived early, its period of gestation consumed 13 years. As early as 1875 an inquiry had been received from a group at Maine Agricultural College, and a few years later there was an unexpected letter from the University of New Mexico-but nothing came of either "feeler." In 1878, John A. Cutter was inducted into the group, a man destined to have much to do with the preservation of the order's early records and with its expansion beyond the confines of the Massachusetts campus. Graduating from Aggie he went on to attend Albany Medical College (which in 1873 had become a unit of Union College) and established a group that became Beta Chapter (1888).

Cutter was also instrumental in the establishment of Gamma at Cornell (1889). The transition to a national order was accomplished. These same early years saw the pin (or badge) adopted essentially as it is today; an induction ritual, which embodied the concept of universal brotherhood and expanded the order's horizons beyond Massachusetts, was written in 1890; the establishment of the fraternity's magazine, The Signet, and the first chapter out of the Northeast came into being at West Virginia University (1891).

"Bigness was never one of our ideas," Big Chief Barrett said in later years, admonishing a convention that was getting starry-eyed over dozens of new expansion possibilities. The principle has held; that though Phi Sigma Kappa stands high among national orders, size alone has never been a major consideration or goal.

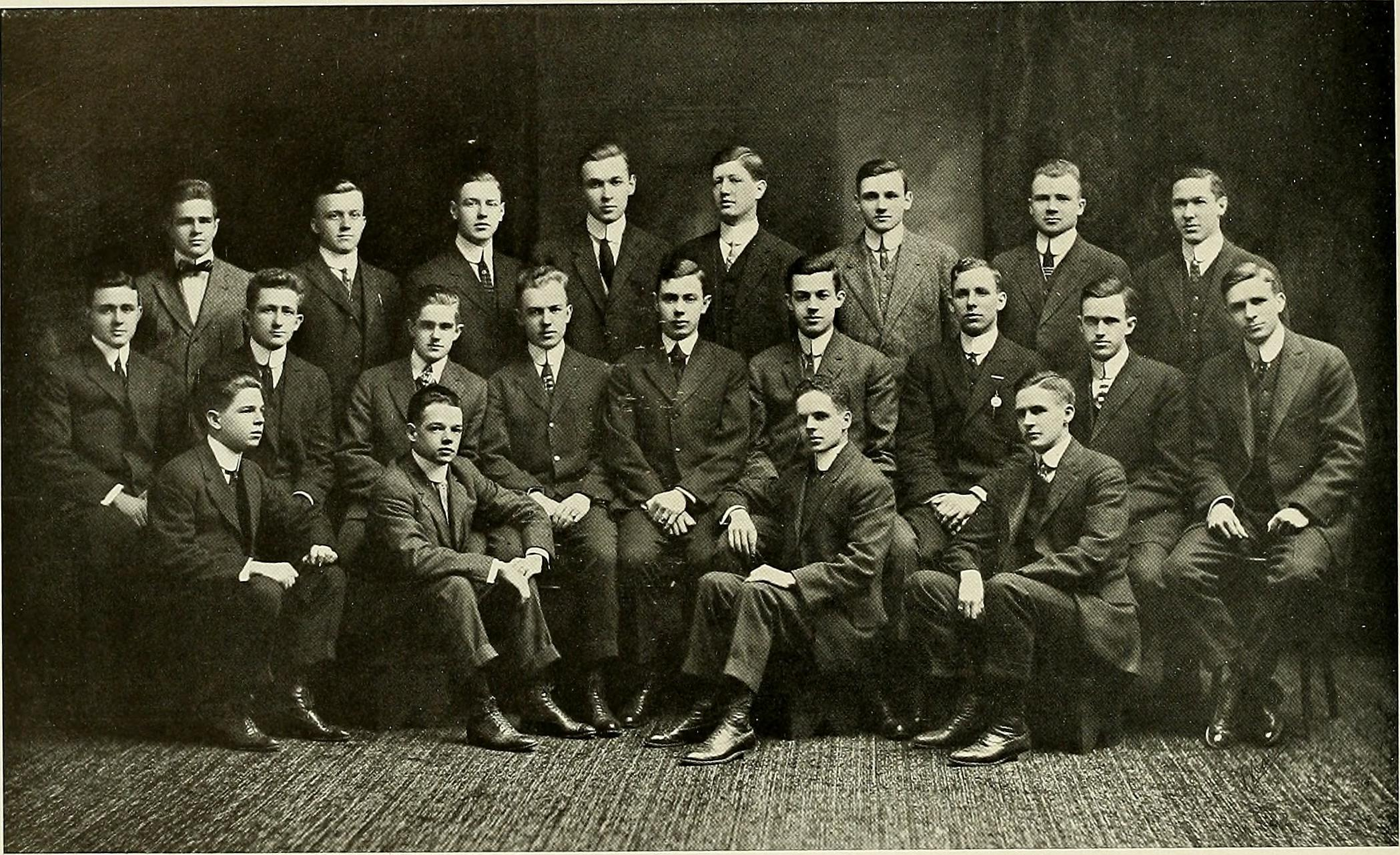
Phi chapter, at Swarthmore College in 1914

Phi Sig's value to other campuses was as an organization offering something special and valuable to persons of varying backgrounds. Massachusetts Agricultural − Aggie − was more egalitarian, open to men of average means but high potential, and not filled with the class-conscious scions of Boston and New York society. In many ways, it has kept this ethic throughout its expansion. It never was simply another fraternity to be invited. Founder Brooks, four years before he died in 1938, put it this way: "We believe that our fraternity exerts a powerful influence for good in national college life. The thought which lay in the minds of the Founders was good. May our brothers never forget that the foundation for a useful and satisfying life must be thought -- thought resulting in the visualization of a high ideal; and the determination to use all of one's strength of body, mind, and soul for its realization."

During the final decade of the 19th century, careful expansion nevertheless led to solid chapters at Yale (Sachem Hall), Columbia, Maryland, Penn State and Penn, among other storied schools. Dartmouth, Brown, and MIT followed soon after. Eventually, Phi Sig was present at six of the eight Ivy League schools; even Canadian campuses were not excluded in the thinking of those who carried new chapters in all directions shortly after the turn of the century. Rho chapter was organized at Queen's University at Kingston, Ontario, in 1903, and seventeen other units were added during the decade. Under Cutter's and Barrett's leadership, the national organization was strengthened, and work was begun among the alumni to support their continued interest in the fraternity after graduation. The Greek system's uniqueness among American organizations is based partly on this principle – the idea of continued involvement for members after their undergraduate days. Phi Sigma Kappa was one of the early leaders in such efforts and remains one of the strongest alumni-oriented groups. If Founder Brooks' assessment of its purpose is true, then there would be no end to the fraternity's influence on its members, and its role in their lives—another vital part of Phi Sig's heritage.

Though the admonition against "bigness for bigness' sake" was always there, the demand to serve campuses wherever they might be was equally loud. In 1909, for example (after the Grand Council had earlier refused to put a chapter on the West Coast because of the distance involved and because it feared such a chapter would be denied the visits and services of a nearby headquarters), the fraternity spanned the continent. The Ridge Road Club of the University of California, Berkeley became Omega chapter—fittingly utilizing the last letter of the Greek alphabet and preparing the way for the first of the Deuteron or second-series units. This national aspect did not escape the notice of the mid-continent; within six months, petitions were received from Minnesota, Illinois and Iowa State. In all, fourteen new chapters were established in the first decade of the new century. Some who were there tell that the induction ceremonies at the early Deuteron units often included a reminder in the form of Founder Hague's benediction on the night of March 15, 1873, words that still ring of idealism and true worth:

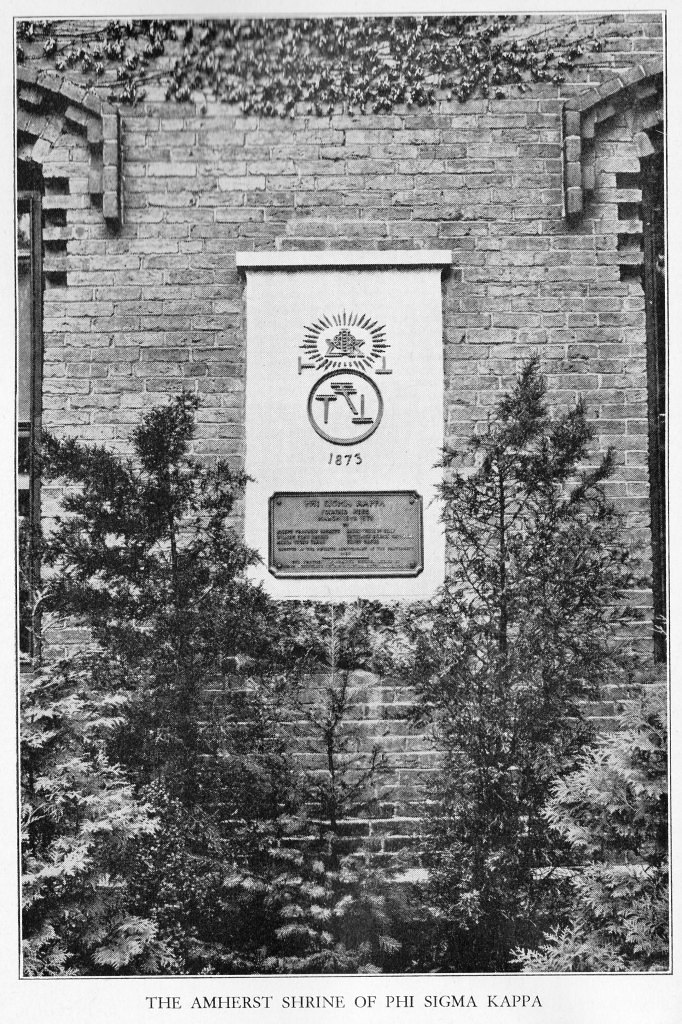
The Shrine of ΦΣΚ, at UMass Amherst

Let us ... keep on growing till our beloved fraternity shall become full grown ..., having the strength to help and protect its members, wisdom to guide them to helpful and good things as to college life, and love so warm that its members shall feel its kindly glow, that brotherly love may indeed be a reality and not an idea.

Phi Sigma Kappa became a founding member of the North American Interfraternity Conference, or NIC, in 1910.

To honor the Founders, on May 12, 1923, members unveiled "The Shrine" on the wall of Old North College, the site of the first meetings of the fraternity. This memorial was moved to the entrance of Machmer Hall in 1957 when Old North was razed.

In the 1920s the fraternity continued to grow, especially into the land grant institutions, with establishment of chapters at Oregon State, Stanford, Tennessee, Alabama, Ohio State, Kentucky, Washington, Oregon, South Carolina and others, twenty-five in all.

=== Great Depression ===
Phi Sig did not escape the Great Depression, as chapters of all fraternities existing at the start of the new century were wooed into increasingly expansive building projects in the boom years leading up to the Great Depression. The economic downturn became the great leveler; chapters that had extended themselves beyond their means were felled by sharply reduced revenues and growing debt. Within Phi Sig, closely tied as it was to its graduates, alumni were called in to support weakened balance sheets on buildings the undergraduate population alone could no longer afford. In one famous but probably not unique case, chapter advisor Sam Gale went door to door in 1931, successfully seeking alumni backing against the mortgage of Minnesota's newly built Tudor masterpiece. Not only was this impulse acted on at the alumni level: The fraternity's undergraduate delegates, moved by the plight of their brethren, had fathered a plan at the 1930 Convention that channeled 25 cents each month from each active member (about $12 per month, per man, in 2021 dollars) into a fund to assist chapters stricken by the Depression. The Depression had brought fraternal belt-tightening where possible, while still investing in tactical, significant national services, training in rushing techniques, a pledge manual, better accounting systems, and visits by field representatives.

Chapter growth slowed, as the fraternity sought to shore up its existing chapters. However, in its sixth decade, Phi Sigma Kappa nevertheless established chapters at Purdue, American University, and Montana State.

Perhaps the most significant development of these years came out of the 1934 Convention in Ann Arbor. Brother Stewart W. Herman of Gettysburg wrote and presented the Phi Sigma Kappa Creed, and Brother Ralph Watts of Massachusetts drafted and presented the fraternity's Cardinal Principles. More than half a century later they stand as Phi Sigma Kappa's heritage personified, as much a part of the fraternity's individuality as any of its more ancient rituals and symbolism.

=== World War II ===
The 1938 Convention adopted the six-degree membership structure to honor the six Founders, especially as a tribute to Founder Brooks, who had died only a few weeks earlier. The first professional manager of the fraternity was hired that same year, marking still another organizational response to growing needs in a critical period. The hardships of World War I and the Great Depression were scarcely overcome when World War II arrived. The extraordinary efforts by which the fraternity survived are another and longer story; the important fact is that Phi Sig did survive. The 1948 Convention in Boston marked the 75th anniversary of the founding. There were 52 active chapters; the Phi Sigma Kappa Foundation had been established, primarily to reward good scholarship among brothers; and The Signet was guaranteed to all members for life under a plan that had few parallels in the Greek world at that time. D. R. (Spec) Collins of Iowa, one of the fraternity's most dynamic leaders of the post-World War II years, reaffirmed the heritage in more modern terms:

The Founders very wisely developed the ritual and philosophy of the fraternity based on service to its members. The Cardinal Principles of Phi Sigma Kappa are the development of brotherhood, scholarship, and character ... There is nothing in our Cardinal Principles about prestige, the most beautiful house, the best social program, [being] 'number one on campus' in intramurals, activities, etc. These are all frosting on the cake. A fraternity chapter that truly serves its purpose helps its members in their personal development. Thus I do not believe a chapter, that pledges students who are already top scholars and which wins a scholarship cup year-in and year-out, outperforms any distinctive service. That chapter which pledges average students, however, and encourages them to develop their academic capabilities to the utmost, deserves the scholarship cup. The same is true of character. If we pledge only the most polished and mature individuals, there is little left for the chapter to do for these people. The fraternity can and should take average college students and help them develop their character, and help them learn to live together in brotherhood. My fraternity did something for me when I was in school. It helped me to learn to live with others and to develop my own personal, moral, and social attributes so that I could fit better into the society that I found when I left the University. The services of fraternity supplemented those of my family, my church, and my teachers. For this reason, I am willing to continue to work for my fraternity -- so long as my fraternity is working to serve its individual members.

=== Post-war restoration ===
The massive post-war influx of GIs to collegiate campuses brought with it a class of men of maturity, and literally, battle-tested experiences of fraternal bonding. For a time, a significant percentage of Phi Sigma Kappa's active members were married. The fraternal magazine was expanded to celebrate marriages and births as a counterpoint to the solemn roster of Gold Stars - servicemen brothers who had been killed in action - or the lists of those still serving. The Signet carried popular interest stories about member wartime experiences, first-hand accounts by seasoned correspondents, and even geopolitical essays.

Demand led to aggressive growth and an expansion of chapters once again; Now, where so many members had served overseas or traveled extensively, awareness and interest in the doings of chapters in distant states became more apparent. Sporting heroes were celebrated. Lists of national collegiate football, basketball, and baseball "All Phi Sig" teams were published and scrutinized. Local programs grew quickly into national events. One example is Phi Sigma Kappa's "Moonlight Girl", a chapter sweetheart contest that rivaled the "Sweetheart of Sigma Chi" as the premier sweetheart pageant of the fraternity world. For a dozen years, The Signet printed photos of many of the winners of local chapter contests for a popular write-in election for the national Moonlight Girl. The winner would travel, with her escort, to the national convention, there to entertain the delegates with songs and conversation. This popular appearance would be underwritten by the fraternity and served to increase attendance. Moonlight Girl continues as a local tradition in a handful of chapters, including Minnesota. The popular Moonlight Girl song was heard around pianos at chapters across the nation:

When we find a girl with golden hair,
And eyes of shining blue,
With lips so rare, and a skin so fair,
And a heart that shall ever be true.
Then we'll love her and cherish her through the years,
Singing this old refrain,
She's the beautiful sweetheart of old Phi Sig,
In our hearts she will e'er remain.

The Phi Sigma Kappa Foundation (PSKF) was formed as a separate legal entity in 1947 to provide scholarships to undergraduates and program support. It has proven to be the financial backbone of the fraternity due to its support of member development and leadership programming and publications.

=== Post World War II ===
Following World War II the fraternity (along with other Greek organizations) faced issues related to segregation, hazing, and academics. During the 1950s, Phi Sigma Kappa removed racial restrictions on membership, worked with other NIC fraternities to eliminate hazing, and revised its membership education program to reflect such changes. During this time membership in Greek organizations declined significantly and some chapters were again lost.

==== Civil rights ====
Phi Sigma Kappa, like almost all fraternities and sororities, formed before the Civil Rights Movement, had previously not taken in minorities on any scale except for the occasional foreign student. At the 1952 Bedford Springs Convention some chapters, mainly outside of New England and the East, wanted an understanding that no chapter would pledge "negroes," and offered legislation to this end called "The Bedford Resolution." The Bedford Resolution read, "That the fraternity's tradition be maintained in the sense that there be no pledging or initiating of Negro men until they are acceptable to all chapters." The Bedford Resolution narrowly passed. Immediately after, Phi Sigma Kappa lost several chapters due to negative reactions to the resolution. The Alpha Triton Chapter at Wesleyan University disaffiliated itself rather than de-pledge a black student it had pledged in good faith, and reformed itself as a local, Gamma Psi. Chapters at Boston University, Hartwick College and Knox College were expelled from the Grand Chapter in 1953-55 for each pledging an African-American student, reverting to their former local status. Tau chapter at Dartmouth College disaffiliated from Phi Sigma Kappa, citing "racist membership policies" of the fraternity as its motivation. Tau became a local fraternity, and eventually the co-ed organization of Phi Tau, in May 1956. Of the chapters that left during the debate, only Tau still operates.

In a letter dated June 28, 1954, D.R. "Spec" Collins, the then-president of Phi Sigma Kappa, announced that from his point of view, "the entire fraternity system is truly an American institution engaged in the service of building good American citizens–is being challenged. Challenged by those subversive elements who, by encouraging us to quarrel among ourselves may cause us to destroy ourselves. The 'divide and conquer strategy' that might well eliminate a great American institution." President Collins warned that the anti-discrimination issue would be raised at the next Phi Sigma Kappa convention. The Bedford Resolution was a policy and was more easily changed than a constitutional measure or bylaw. Two years after its passage, at the 1954 Convention the Bedford Resolution was repealed in favor of a non-legislative "Gentlemen's Agreement" to ban non-whites. This much weaker, short-lived, informal agreement also encouraged local chapters not to admit minorities to membership.

Two years later, at the 1956 Convention, the Gentlemen's Agreement was also dropped leaving no race restrictions. Immediately following the 1956 Convention, Phi chapter at Swarthmore, in Pennsylvania, pledged a black man from the Gold Coast. The Grand President simply took the stance that he would not suspend the chapter, since neither the Bedford Resolution nor any other agreement was in place. At the 1958 convention, there was little discussion of the matter.

In 2009 some delegates to that year's convention felt that a definitive statement on the issue of discrimination should be incorporated into the constitution itself. Phi Sigma Kappa amended its constitution to include the following nondiscrimination clause, largely intended as a formality:

"No chapter shall discriminate in recruitment or membership based on race, color, religion, national origin, age, disability, ethnic background, sexual orientation, veteran status, marital status, parental status, or political affiliation."

=== Merger ===
Phi Sigma Kappa first discussed mergers at the onset of World War II when most fraternities were in danger of falling apart as students went to war. The issue was not discussed seriously again on a national level for decades.

In 1980, a Phi Sigma Kappa Council meeting included the subject of mergers on its agenda. The outcome of the discussion was the conclusion that Phi Sigma Kappa would only participate in a merger if it was the continuing fraternity: Phi Sigma Kappa was open to absorbing a smaller fraternity.

In 1984, a chapter of Phi Sigma Epsilon placed a call to the national headquarters of Phi Sigma Kappa to discuss the fact that several Phi Sigma Epsilon chapters were unhappy with the services of their national organization and that they were interested in Phi Sigma Kappa's expansion efforts. These chapters were considering a change in national affiliation which is not possible under the rules of the NIC. A call was made between the presidents of both national organizations but a merger was not explored.

Later on in the fall of 1984, the two fraternities were placed next to each other at a table during the NIC conference. Discussions commenced and the members at the conference discovered that they had more in common than the first two letters of their respective fraternity's names. Phi Sigma Epsilon's beliefs in justice, wisdom, and honor closely paralleled Phi Sigma Kappa's cardinal principles of brotherhood, scholarship, and character. Phi Sigma Epsilon was in the midst of difficult administrative and financial circumstances and most chapters were in the interior of the contiguous United States. Phi Sigma Kappa, although relatively strong both administratively and financially, was concentrated on the east and west coasts of the country. It was found that both organizations had similar rituals upon the report of a brother of Phi Sigma Epsilon who had become an adviser of a Phi Sigma Kappa chapter. That chapter had allowed the faculty adviser to view the rituals of Phi Sigma Kappa. This was an error on the part of the Phi Sigma Kappa chapter but it allowed the two national organizations to otherwise resolve the awkward question of how similar their secrets were.

Chapter questionnaires, meetings, and communications regarding a merger would occupy both fraternities over several months. Phi Sigma Epsilon narrowly voted in favor of the merger in June 1985. Phi Sigma Kappa's convention was not until August but initial responses were overwhelmingly positive.

On August 14, 1985, the merger was approved and formalized. In a stroke of good fortune for the two national bodies, there was only one school, Cornell University, which had active chapters of both fraternities. Younger, and smaller, the Phi Sigma Epsilon chapter was released to affiliate with another national fraternity.

Phi Sigma Kappa's Court of Honor was expanded to include all past presidents of Phi Sigma Epsilon. Shannon Flowers of PSE agreed to serve as the new Recorder for that entity. The Grand Council was expanded to include PSE's past president James Whitfield and former vice president Larry Beck. The Ritual of Association was rewritten to include significant portions of the Phi Sigma Epsilon ritual, and the PSE ritual itself was cast into the form of a special lecture to be added to the ritual book of all chapters for use on particular occasions. The co-author of Phi Sigma Epsilon's ritual, Fred Schwengel, a strong supporter of the Merger, assisted in the incorporation of the two rituals.

At the Convention in 1987 in Long Beach, California, two years following the merger, the crest, Associate Member (pledge) pin, and flag were changed to incorporate the symbolism of Phi Sigma Epsilon.

Alumni of PSE chapters that merged into Phi Sigma Kappa are accorded the same rank or honors as they held in PSE. The PSE badge is honored as equivalent to a PSK badge for those alumni who choose to wear it. Where Phi Sigma Kappa HQ has accurate mailing addresses, they also receive fraternity mailings and chapter news.

==== Dissension ====
Almost all Phi Sigma Epsilon chapters and all Phi Sigma Kappa chapters participated in the merger, which was noted as the largest and most successful collegiate fraternal merger ever.

Leaders of both fraternities made great attempts to be sensitive to the pain of change and emotions of loss that any such merger would naturally entail. There were pockets of dissent, and not all chapters nor all alumni of Phi Sigma Epsilon participated. Soon after the merger, the former PSE chapter at Cornell was released to join another national; its building was sold to Alpha Chi Omega sorority. Other PSE chapters were found to be non-viable or had simply evaporated in the few years since a PSE officer had last visited or corresponded. These were formally closed. Eventually, following several disaffected alumni leaders of Phi Sigma Epsilon, seven PSE groups would go on to form Phi Sigma Phi in 1988. Today, both fraternities seek to focus on their futures and maintain a posture of civility and cooperation on those occasions where they cross paths. Considering their shared history and the economic difficulties of supporting full-time operations with a small base of chapter revenue, Phi Sigma Kappa has consistently maintained it would welcome future inquiries toward cooperation from Phi Sigma Phi and her chapters, as a homecoming.

Phi Sigma Kappa continues to teach new members its enlarged historical record, marking milestones of both original fraternities.

=== Present ===
More recently, expansion efforts have been increased, and now somewhat outpace chapter closures, bringing in schools where Phi Sigma Kappa has not had a historical presence, as well as revitalizing troubled groups or dormant groups. This period of expansion has been entwined with an assertive effort to ensure the many surviving former Phi Sigma Epsilon chapters were fully integrated into the larger fraternity, and fully served. Several have had to be re-established, an effort that continues today. Aggressive risk management training has allowed Phi Sig to avoid, for the most part, headline-making news about hazing incidents. Key expansion targets and the return to long-established campuses where chapters have been lost have been another focus. While the fraternity has not lost sight of the attitude of its Founders to not seek bigness for its own sake, Phi Sigma Kappa's Grand Council affirmed a desire for purposeful expansion in the 1980s and 90s which has enhanced its ability to provide the programs and services expected of a strong international fraternity.

Since the merger, Phi Sigma Kappa has grown at a rate of at least two chapters per year.

On many campuses, the provision of suitable housing remains the biggest challenge for a new provisional chapter. Phi Sigma Kappa Properties (PSKP), a separate legal entity, was created in 2002 to address this issue in areas of management, finding and funding buildings, dissemination of best practices for alumni holding companies, and building improvements for Phi Sig chapters nationwide.

The Signet Ring of Phi Sigma Kappa

The Kinney Coat of Arms was suggested as Phi Sigma Kappa's crest. It was not adopted but remains in informal use as an artistic favorite.

== Symbols ==
The fraternity's motto is "Do unto others as you would have them do unto you." Its Cardinal Principles or pillars are To Promote Brotherhood, To Stimulate Scholarship, To Develop Character.

The fraternity's colors are Cardinal red and silver. Its mascot is the owl. The original flower of Phi Sigma Kappa was the red carnation. After the merger, in 1987 the fraternity adopted a second official flower, the White Tea Rose, which had been honored by Phi Sigma Epsilon. Phi Sigma Kappa now recognizes both flowers with equal deference.

Phi Sigma Kappa's publication is The Signet.

=== Badge ===
The official pin consists of the three Greek letters (ΦΣΚ). The letter Φ may be plain gold or crown set with fifteen whole pearls and is superimposed upon a rose engraved and rose finished chased gold Σ to the left and Κ to the right. As a mark of distinction, council members may wear a ruby instead of a pearl as the center jewel, and national presidents are presented with a badge set with diamonds instead of pearls, and with a ruby as the center jewel. Appointive officers may wear an emerald instead of a pearl as their center jewel. The pledge pin used to be a red button approximately 3/8 inch in diameter. That pin was surrounded by a silver band in which the original Three T characters of the society were inset in silver. After the adoption of the merger symbolism in 1987, the circle and Triple T's characters were circumscribed by a slightly larger triangle of silver. Phi Sigma Kappa continues to recognize the Phi Sigma Epsilon badge for those brothers who received it before the merger of the two fraternities.

=== Flag ===
The official flag had been seven by five feet in dimension, but in 2021 those specific dimensions were relaxed to allow flags of other sizes. The description of the flag remains consistent: three horizontal bars of equal height. The bottom bar is red and symbolizes First and Second Degree members, the foundation of the fraternity. The middle bar is silver for Third and Fourth Degree members, indicative of the field of fraternal service. The Greek letters ΦΣΚ are located in the center of this bar. The top bar, also red, commemorates Fifth and Sixth Degree members, indicative of Grand Chapter recognition. The silver and red Tumbling T's logo inscribed in a triangle of silver is located at the left end of the upper bar.

This flag was adopted at the 1987 Convention, before this, Phi Sigma Kappa's flag bore the Triple T's set alone in a round border, without the triangle, and used the old colors of silver and magenta in an otherwise identical layout. It was at the 1987 Convention in Long Beach, CA that a special "merger committee" gave its recommendations including the new flag design, updated colors of Cardinal Red and Silver, revised wording of the Cardinal Principles paragraphs, various changes to the esoteric Ritual, the updated crest design and updated pledge pin design. The committee's report was adopted by a wide margin, with acclaim, as ATPS notes "continuing the spirit of the [merger] convention."

== Chapters ==
Interest groups form provisional chapters, which in turn become chapters by earning a Phi Sigma Kappa charter from the international headquarters. A charter is a document that conveys from a governing body permission for a local group to operate as a chapter. A PSK charter also signifies the date and location of the new chapter and lists its founding members. In the event of a re-colonization, a new group may still refer to the original charter date when citing the age of their chapter, even in a re-colonization.

Chapters are individually designated by a chapter name. The original 24 chapters are called, in order, Alpha, Beta, Gamma, etc., thru to Omega. Following this, the "Deuteron" series began with Alpha Deuteron, then Beta Deuteron, Gamma Deuteron, and continuing through to Omega Deuteron. As of 2010, eight naming series have been established. Several other fraternities and sororities use a similar naming system. The Greek-based designations used by Phi Sigma Kappa include:

Original Series, Alpha through Omega
Deuteron Series, or second series, beginning with Alpha Deuteron
Triton Series, or third series
Tetarton Series, or fourth series
Pentaton Series, or fifth series
Hexaton Series, or sixth series
Septaton Series, or seventh series
Octaton Series, or eighth series

Phi Sigma Epsilon brought its naming system to the fraternity. Concerning the sensitivity of the merger in general, it was quickly decided that incoming PSE chapters could with pride maintain either their original chapter names or a chapter name that evoked their source in PSE. These naming series are:

Epsilon Series, original oldest 24 PSE chapters
Phi Series, second PSE series
Sigma Series, third PSE series

Additionally, the three founding chapters of Phi Sigma Epsilon were honored by reversing in their names the letters "Epsilon Alpha" into Alpha Epsilon, "Epsilon Beta" into Beta Epsilon, and "Epsilon Gamma" into Gamma Epsilon, signifying their role in the formation of Phi Sigma Epsilon. The fourth oldest PSE chapter is Epsilon Delta, with the naming convention remaining more or less consistent, depending on the age of the chapter, and with some exceptions to match most closely the original names of those chapters.

Chapter lists are rendered in order of the original date of chapter founding.

Re-establishment where both groups existed but where they both are dormant usually takes on the name of the older dormant chapter, although some exceptions have been made if the alumni base has a clear preference.

New chapters where there has been neither a PSK nor PSE chapter will continue the Octaton series, or further series, as needed.

== Chapter houses ==
Following are images of many of the Phi Sigma Kappa chapter houses. Many of the buildings in the historical photos are still owned by fraternity chapters and their alumni today, having been remodeled and expanded, while others have been replaced.

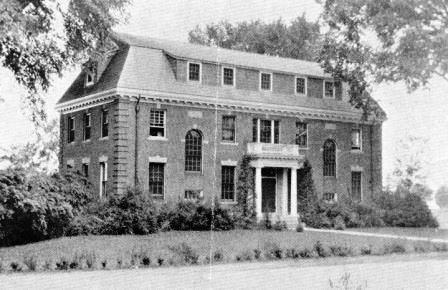
Alpha at UMass, c. 1910

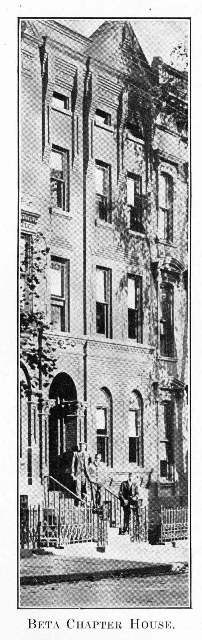
Beta at Union, 1910

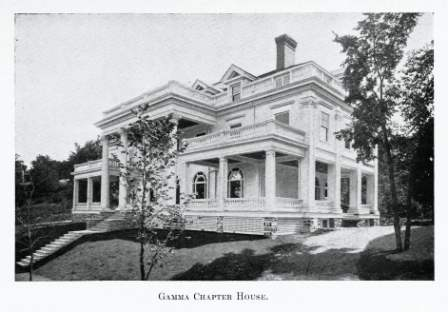
Gamma at Cornell University, c. 1903

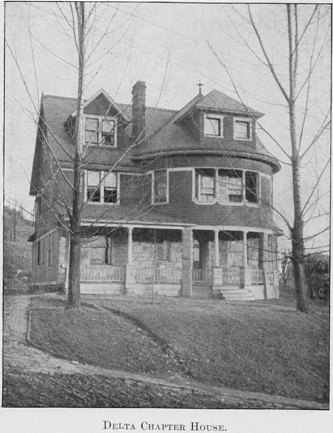
Delta at West Virginia, 1910. (former)

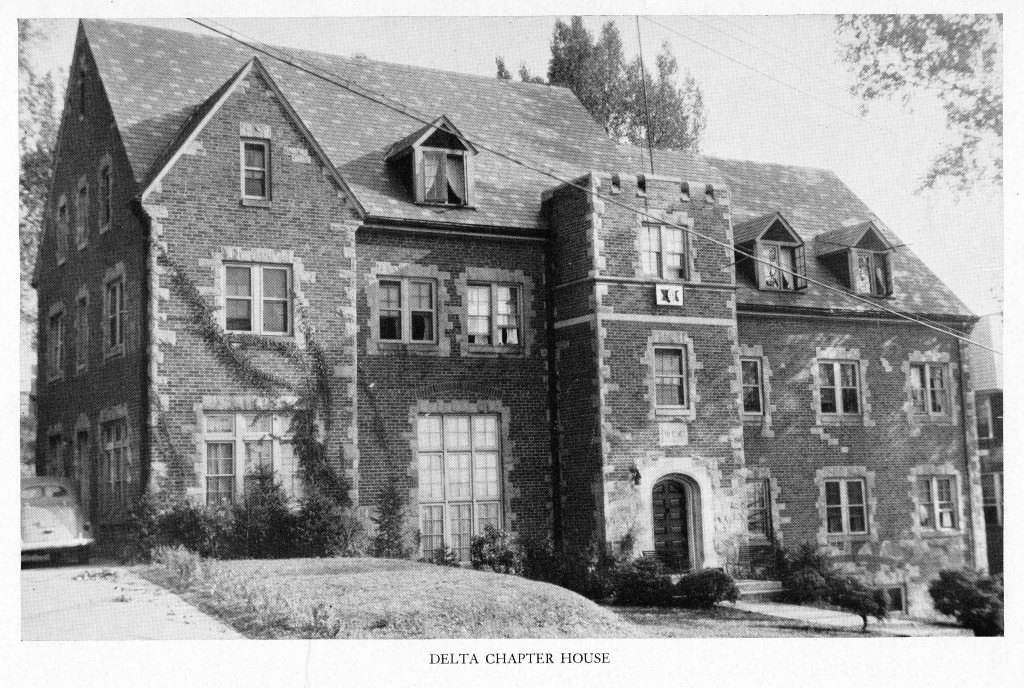
Delta at West Virginia, c. 1941

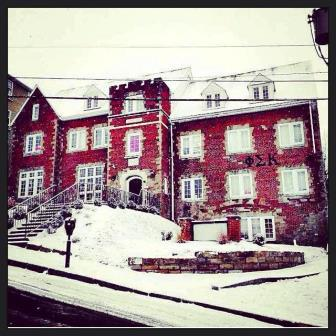
Delta at West Virginia University, 2012

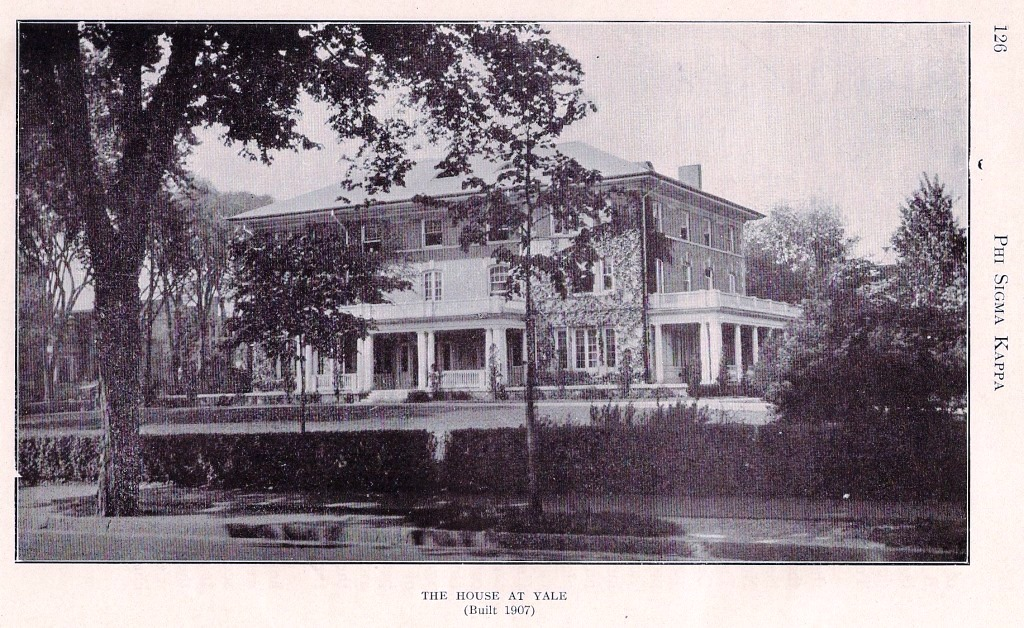
Epsilon's Sachem Hall, at Yale, c. 1907

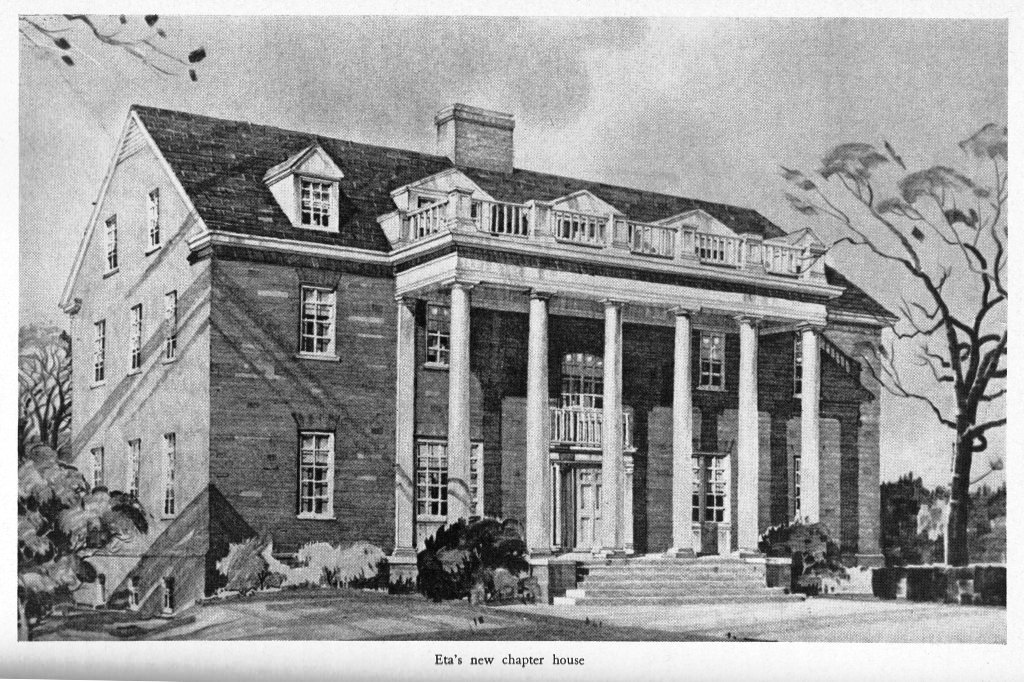
Eta at Maryland, circa 1954

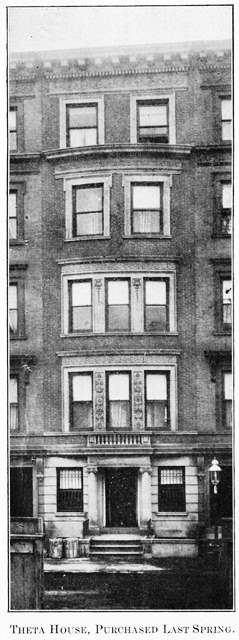
Theta at Columbia, 1910

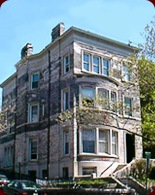
Iota at Stevens Institute, 2008

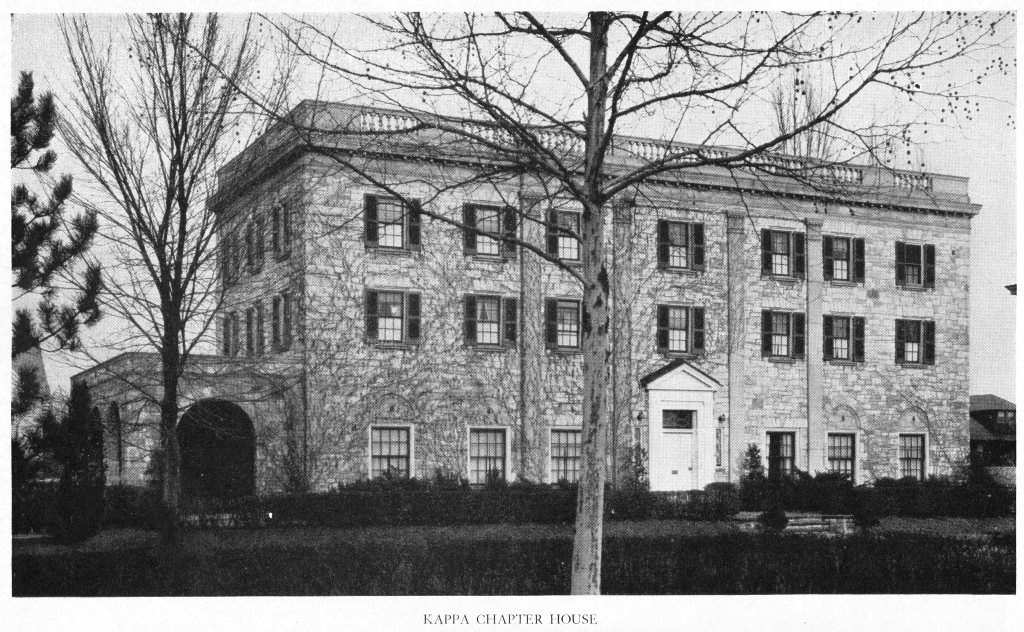
Kappa at Penn State, c. 1950

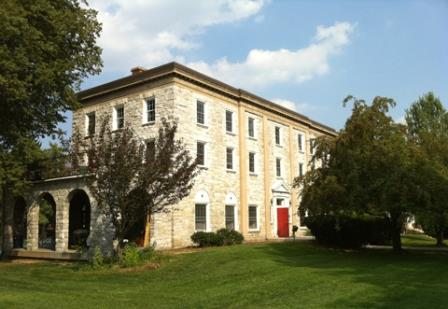
Kappa at Penn State, 2010

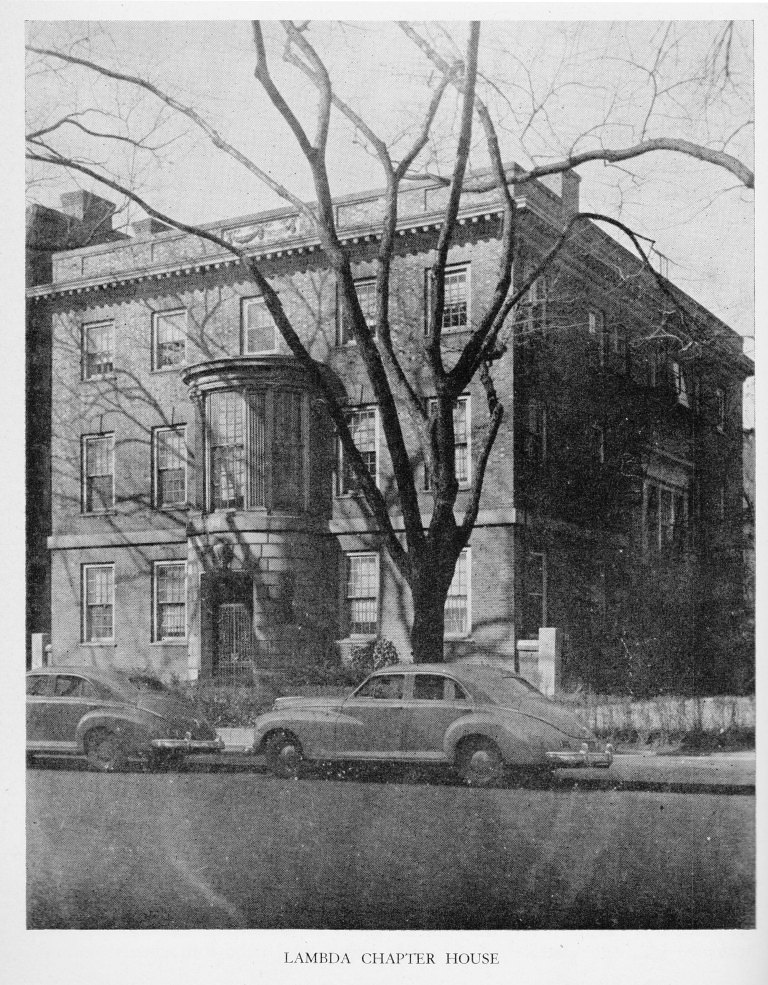
Lambda at George Washington, c. 1947

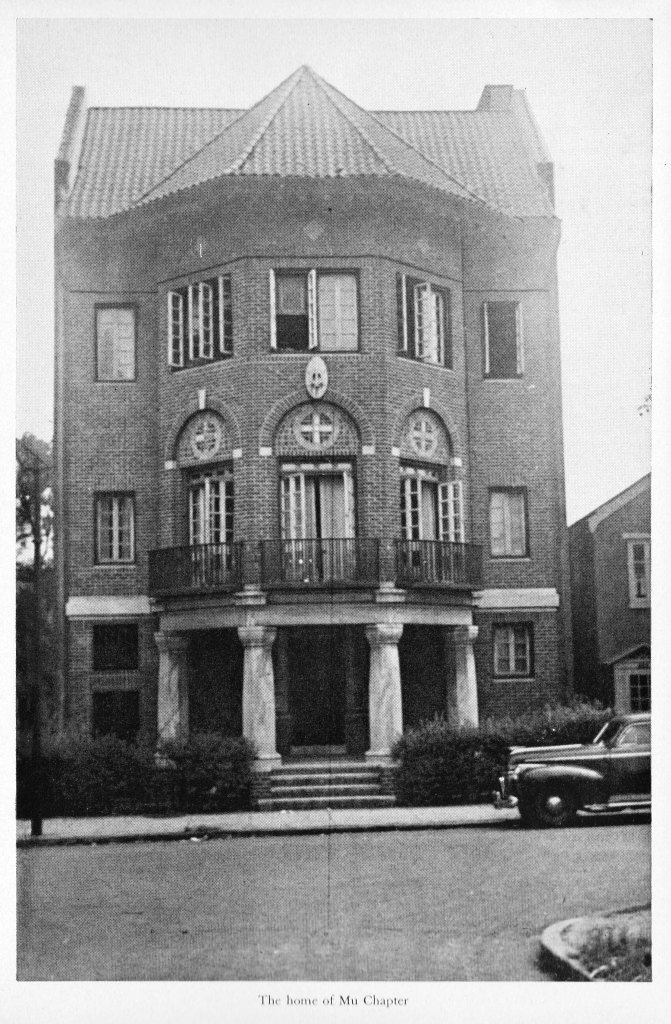
Mu at Penn, c. 1950

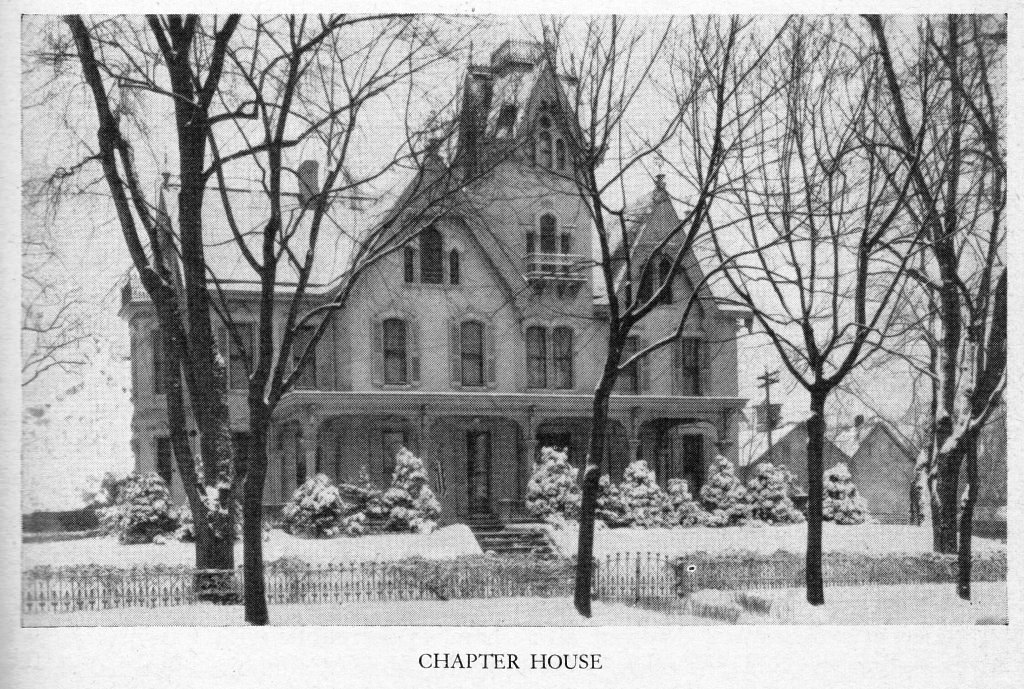
Nu at Lehigh, c. 1948

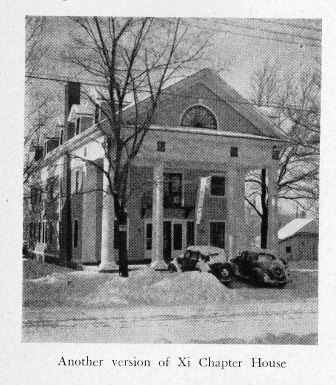
Xi at St. Lawrence, c. 1949

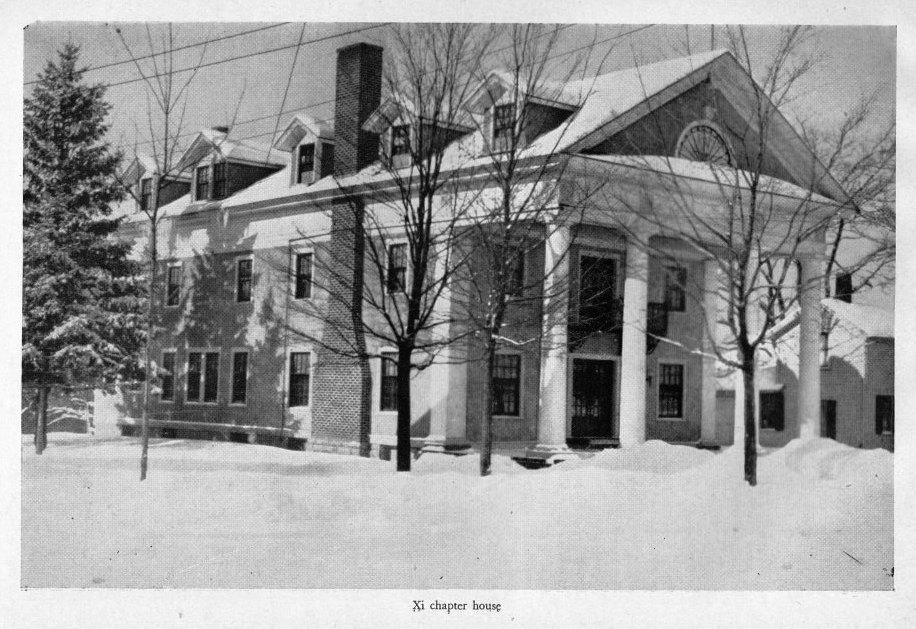
Xi at St. Lawrence, c. 1952

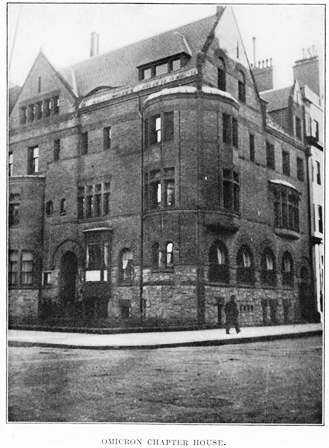
Omicron at MIT, circa 1911 (former)

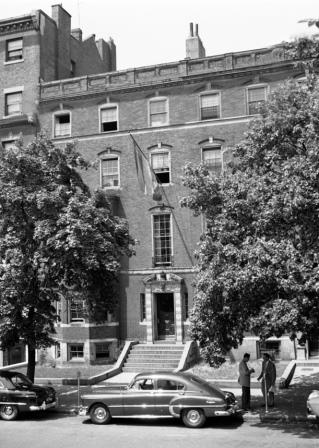
Omicron at MIT, early-1950s

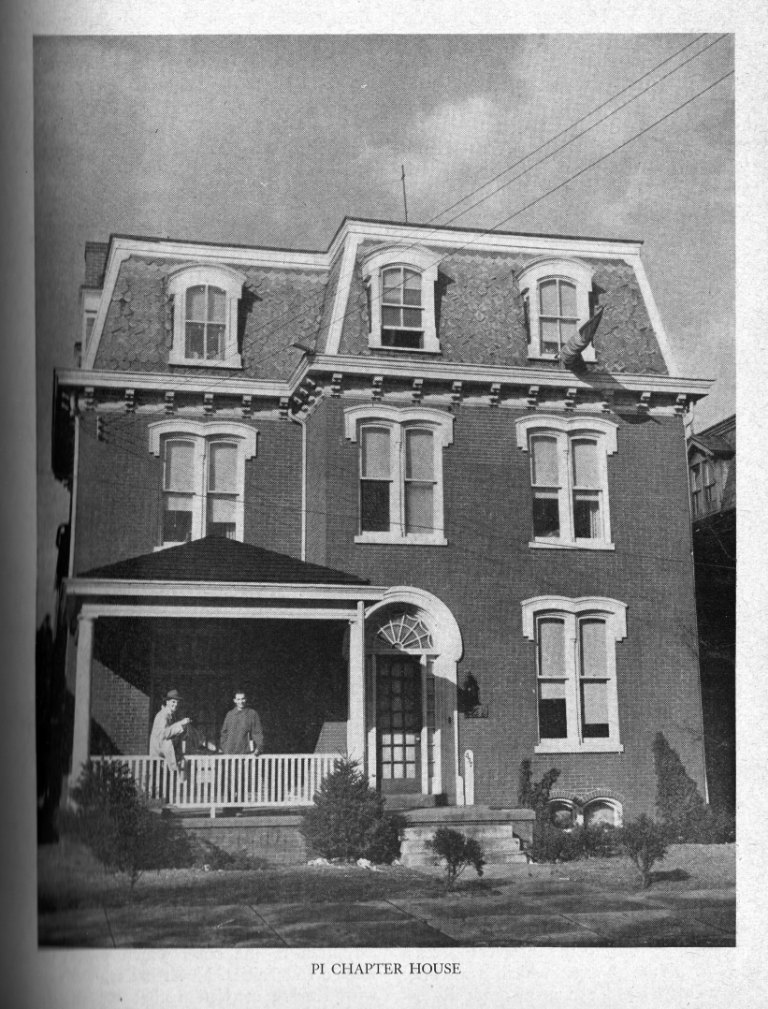
Pi at Franklin & Marshall, c. 1943

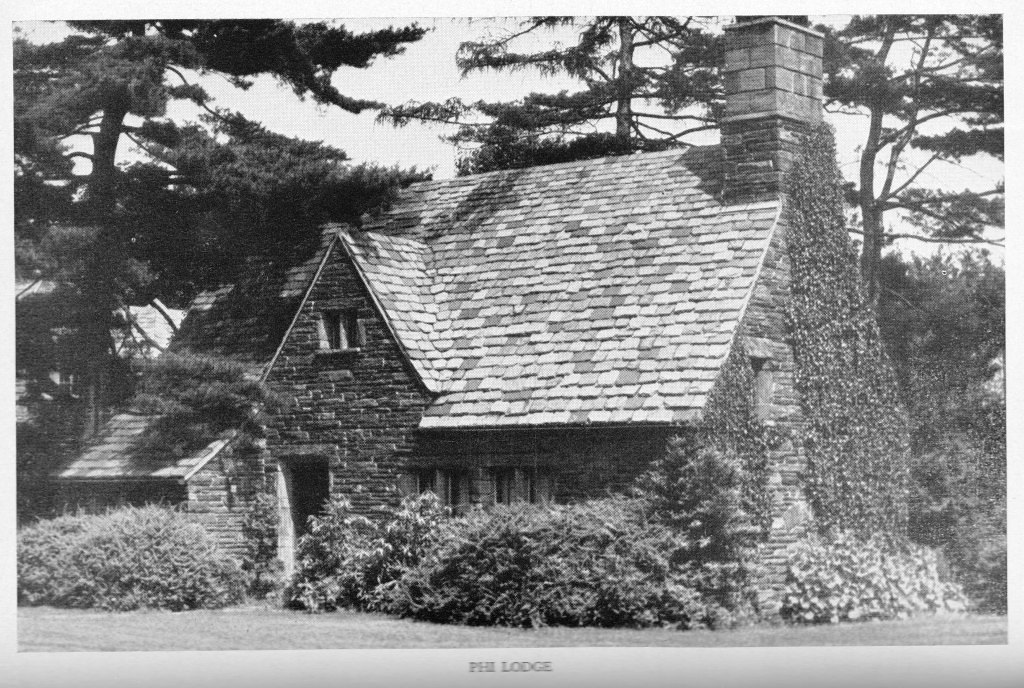
Phi at Swarthmore, c. 1944

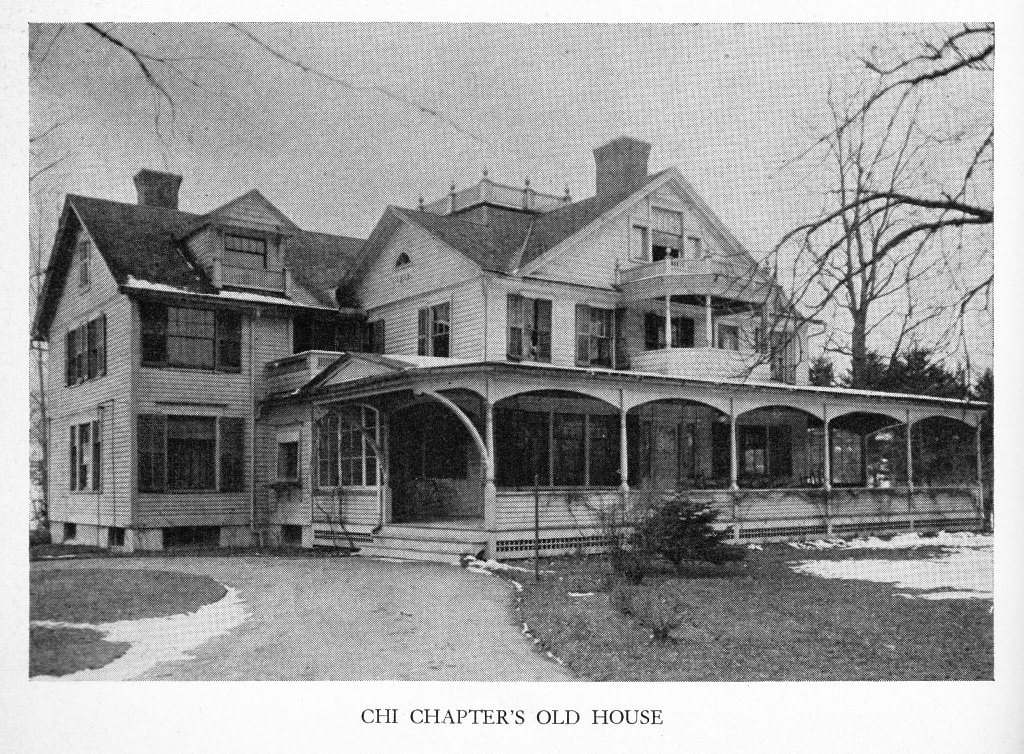
Chi at Williams, prior to 1947 (former)

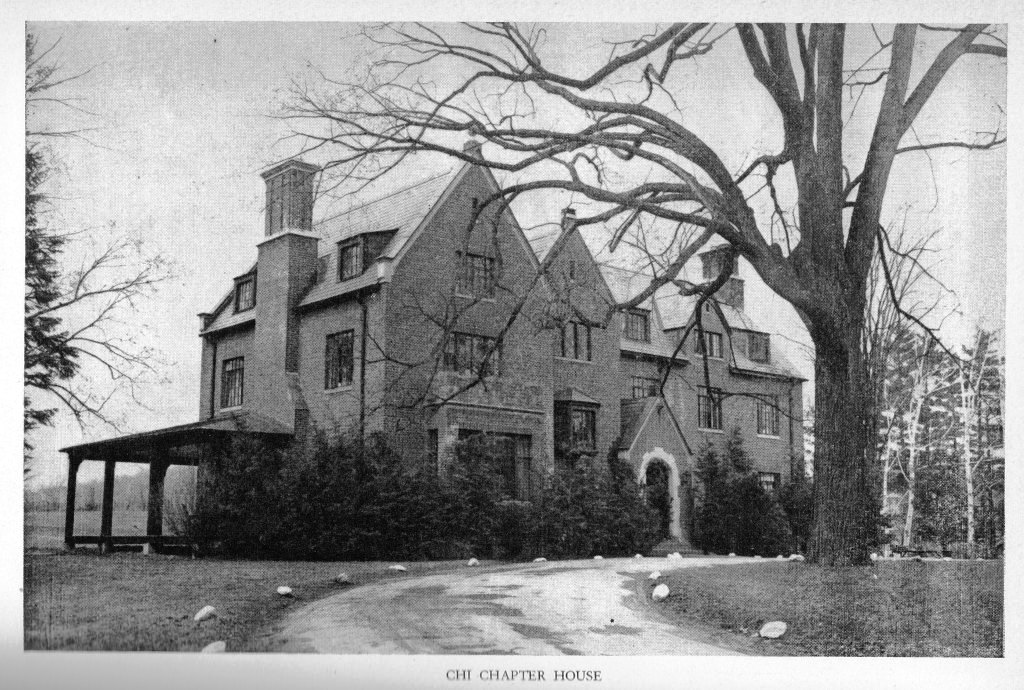
Chi at Williams, circa 1947

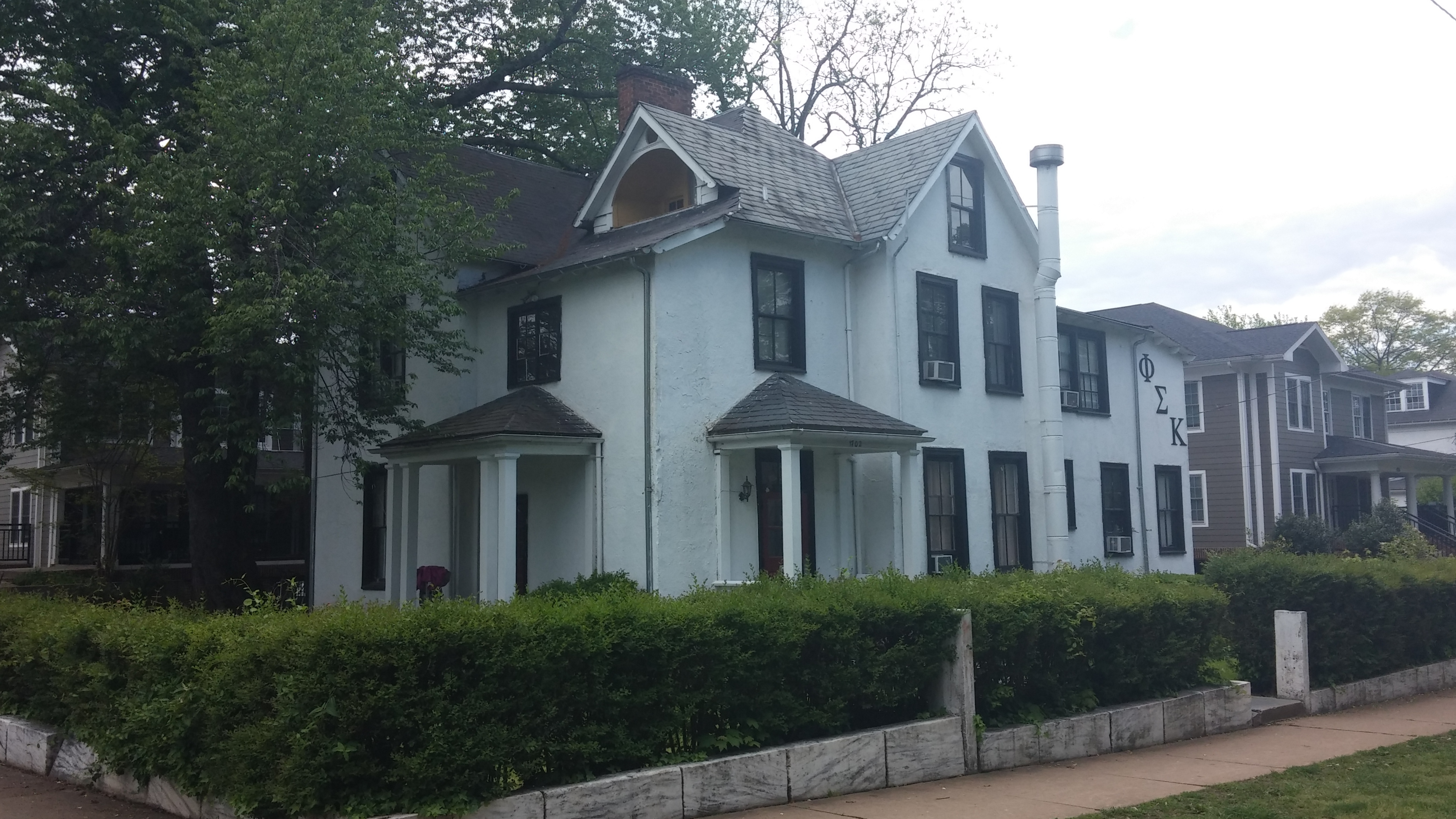
Psi at Virginia

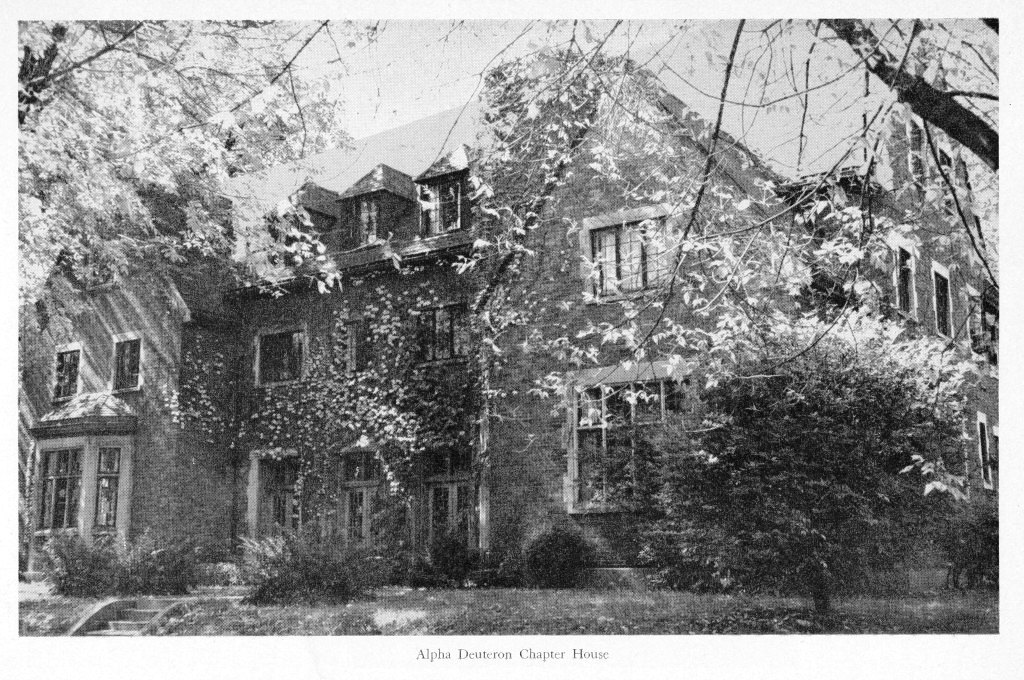
Alpha Deuteron at Illinois, c. 1950

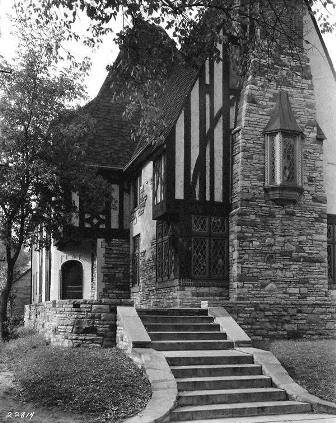
Beta Deuteron at Minnesota, c. 1933

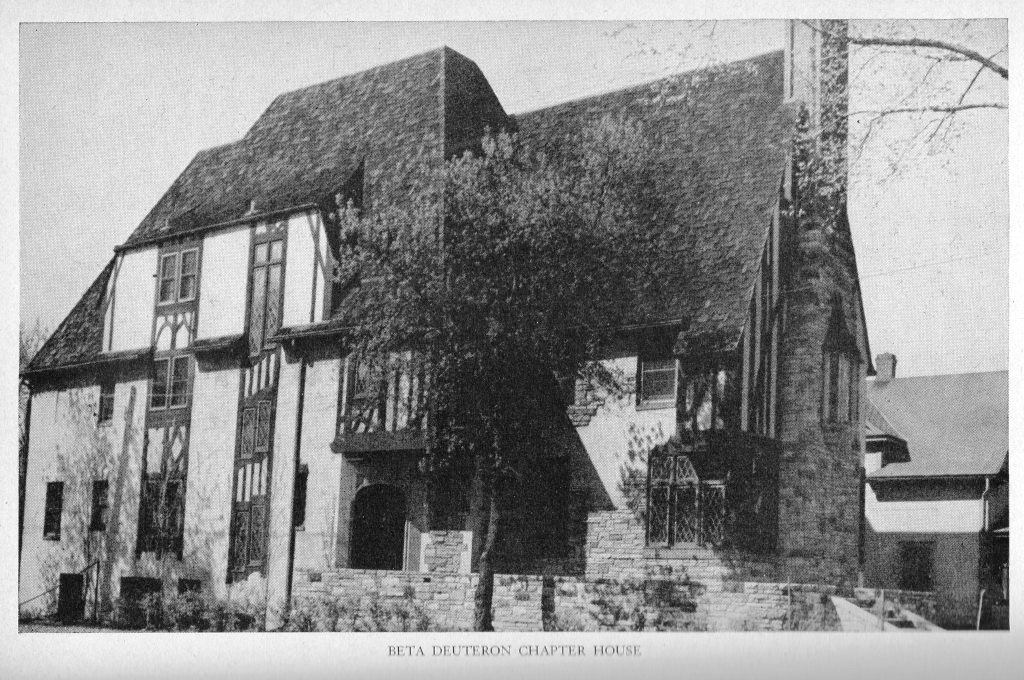
Beta Deuteron at Minnesota, c. 1947

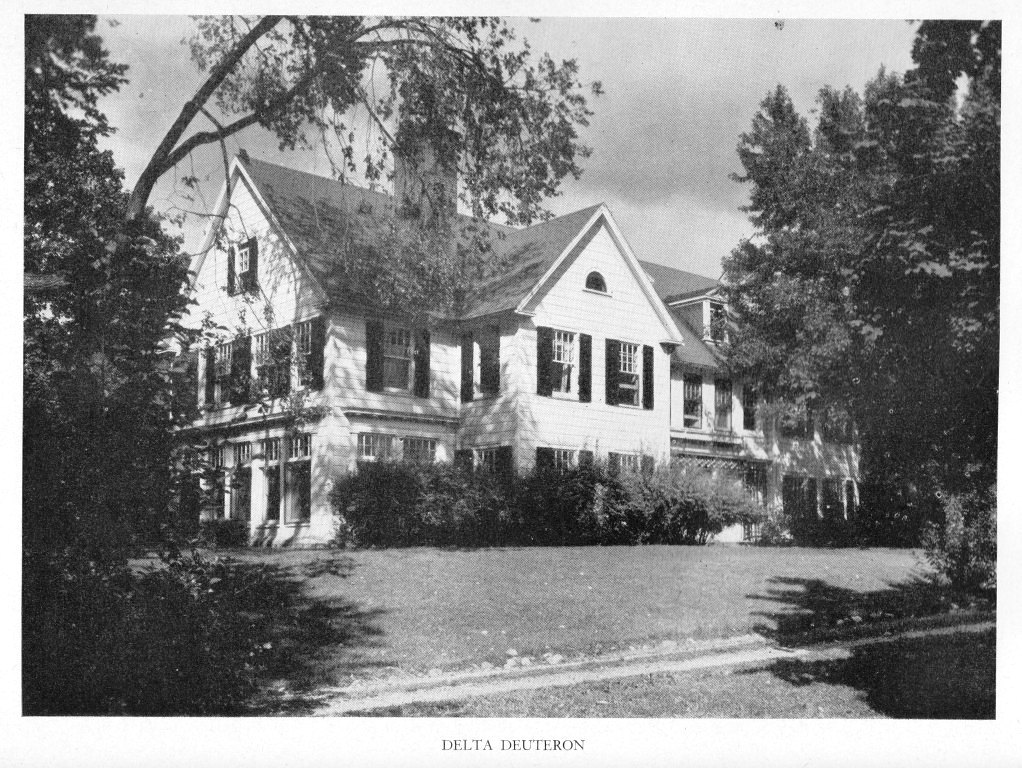
Delta Deuteron at Michigan, c. 1946

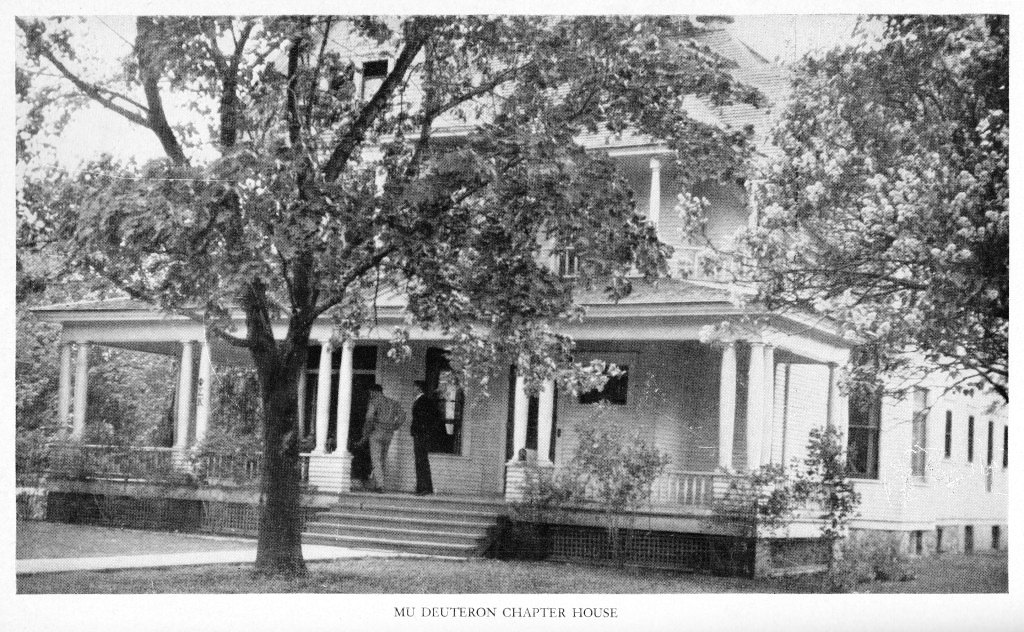
Mu Deuteron at the University of Montana, c. 1948

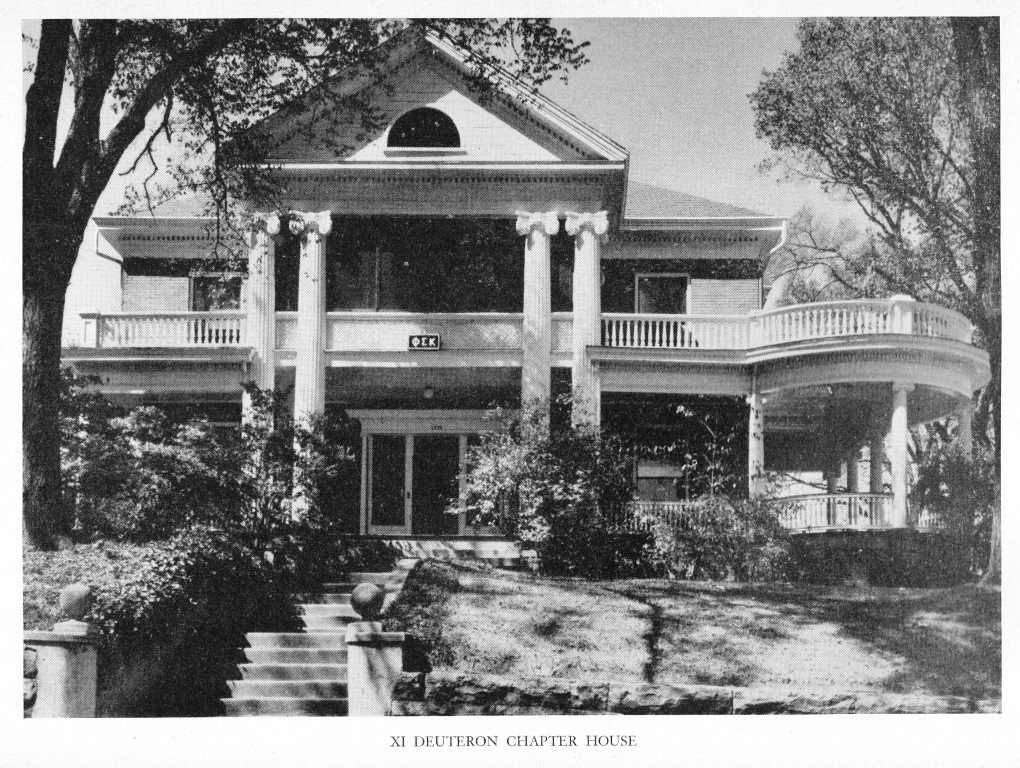
Xi Deuteron at Tennessee, c. 1946 (former)

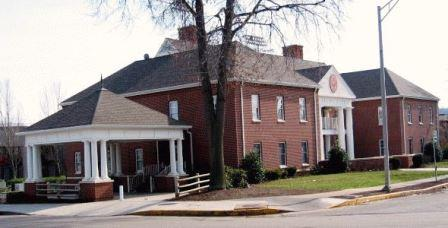
Xi Deuteron at the University of Tennessee, 2005

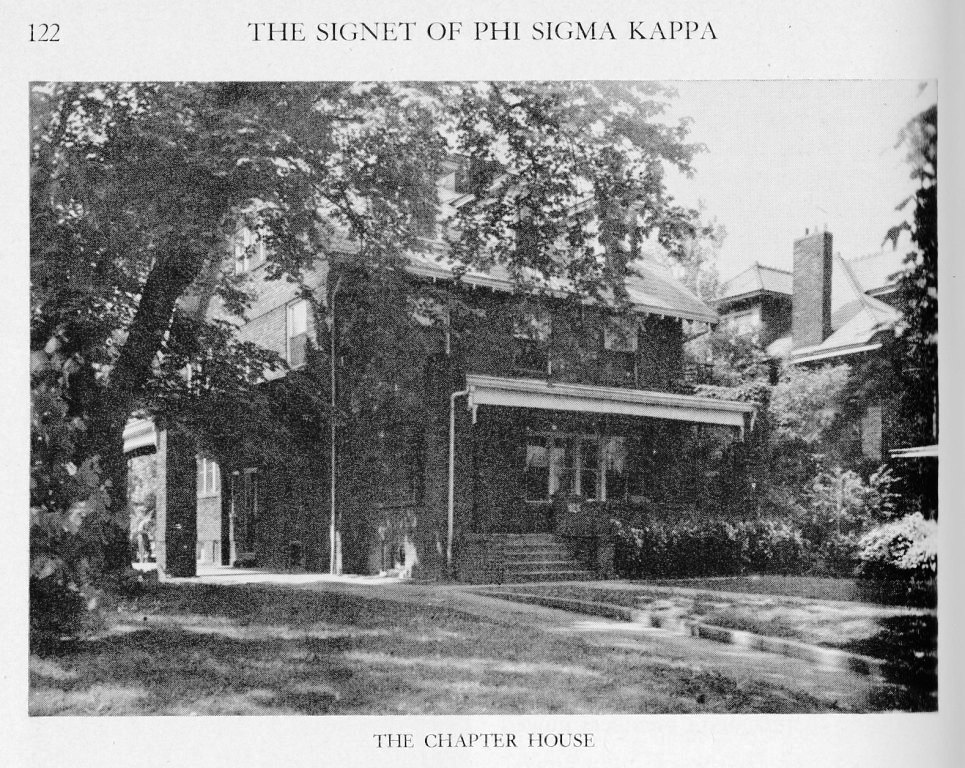
Pi Deuteron at Ohio State, c. 1950

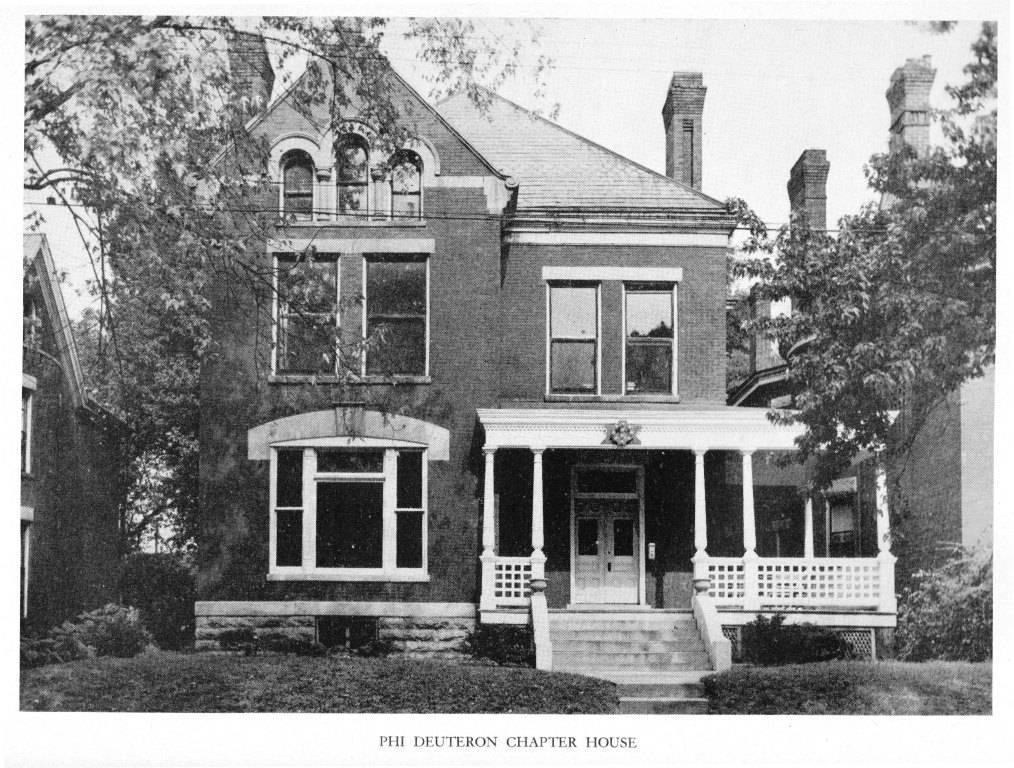
Phi Deuteron at Kentucky, c. 1946

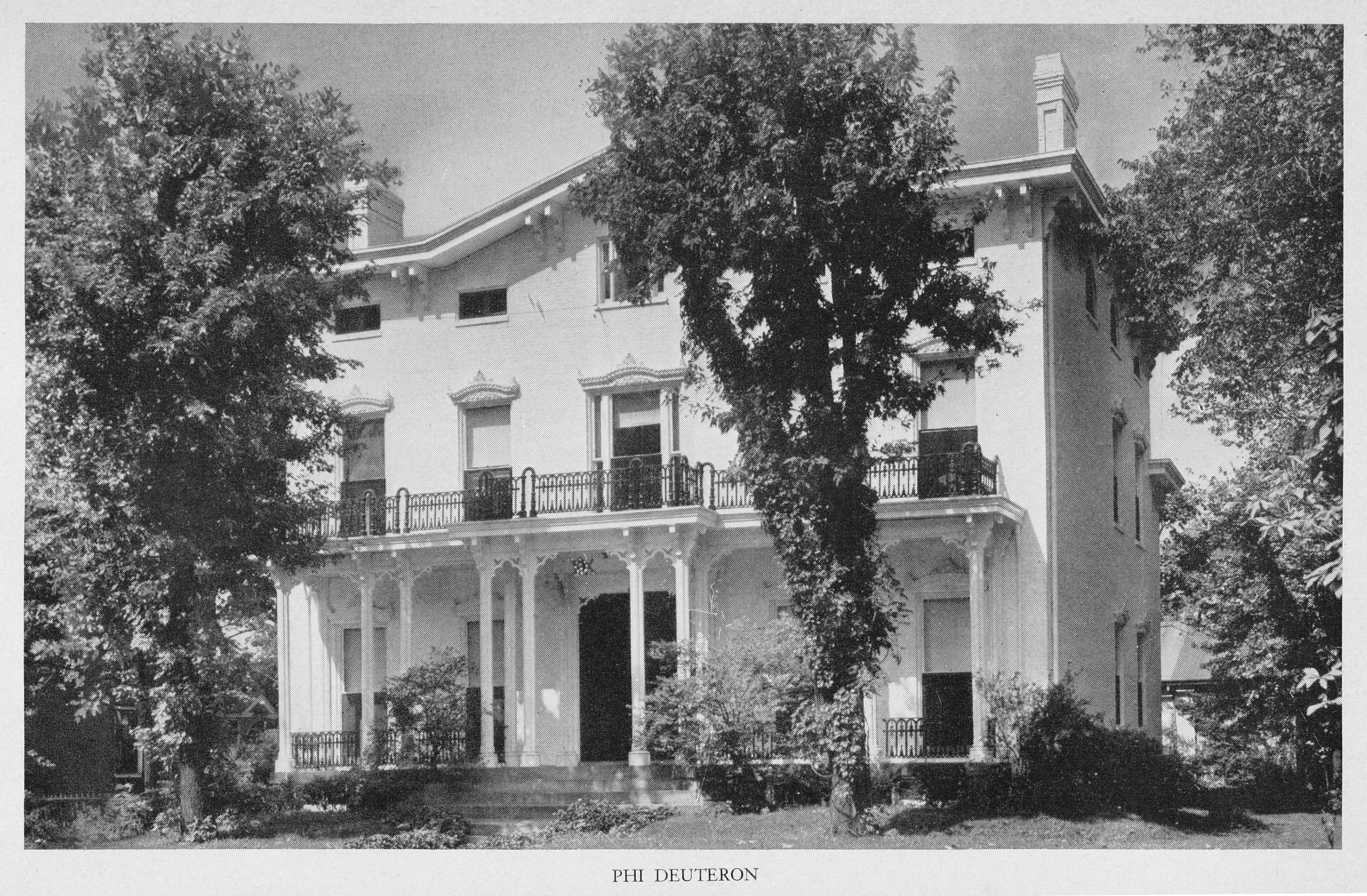
Phi Deuteron at Kentucky, c. 1941

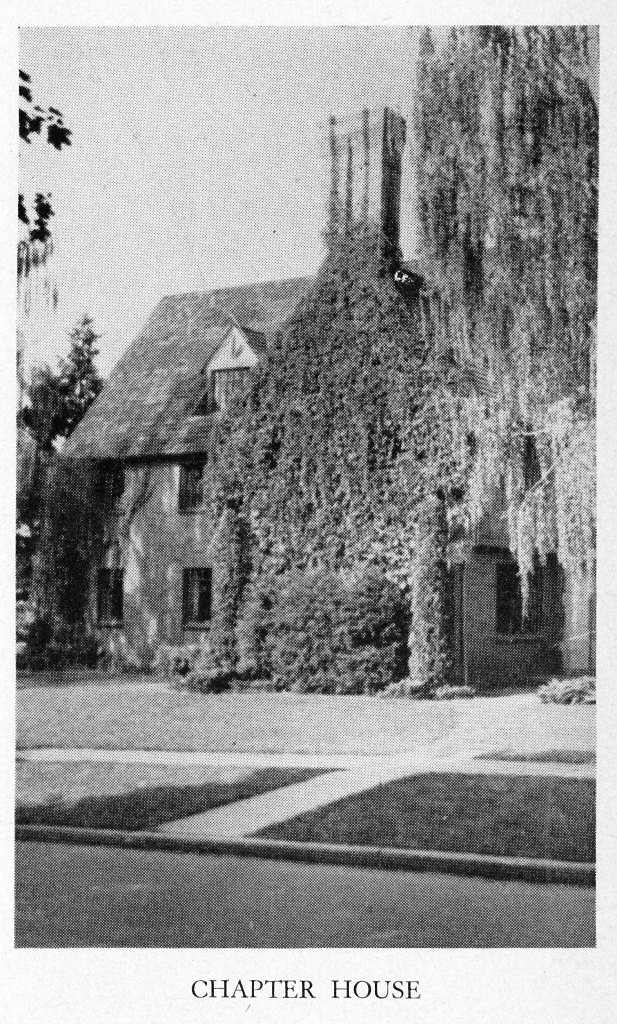
Chi Deuteron at Washington State, c. 1947

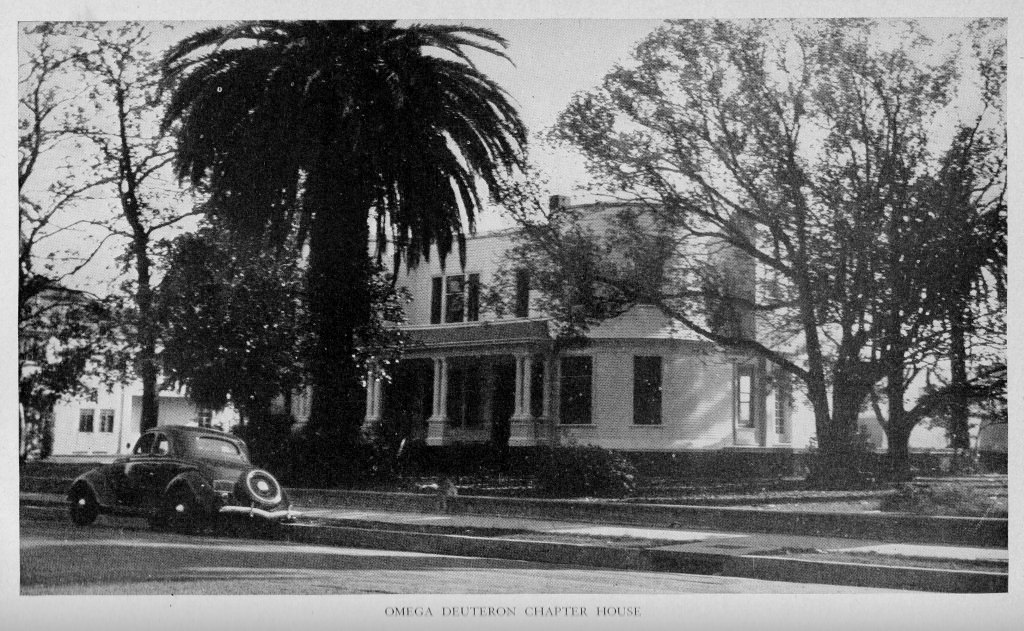
Omega Deuteron at USC, c. 1946 (former)

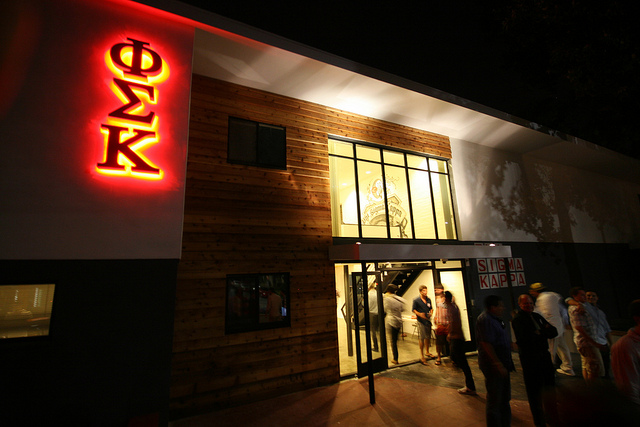
Omega Deuteron at USC, 2013

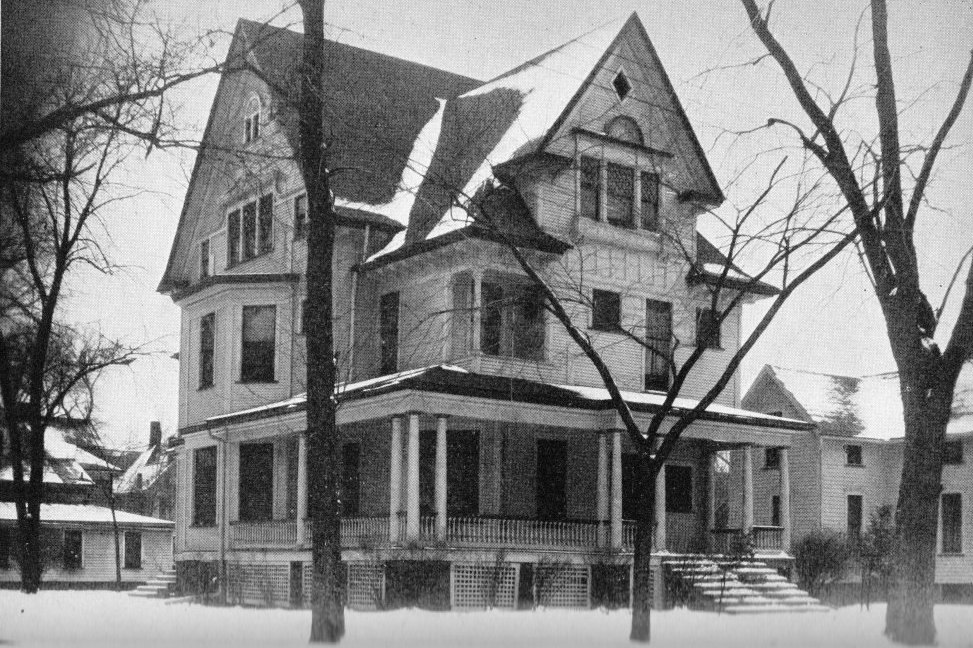
Beta Triton at Knox, c. 1946

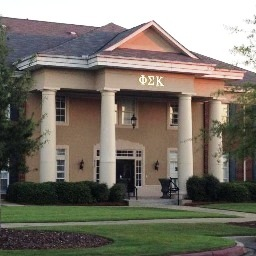
Gamma Triton at South Carolina, 2013

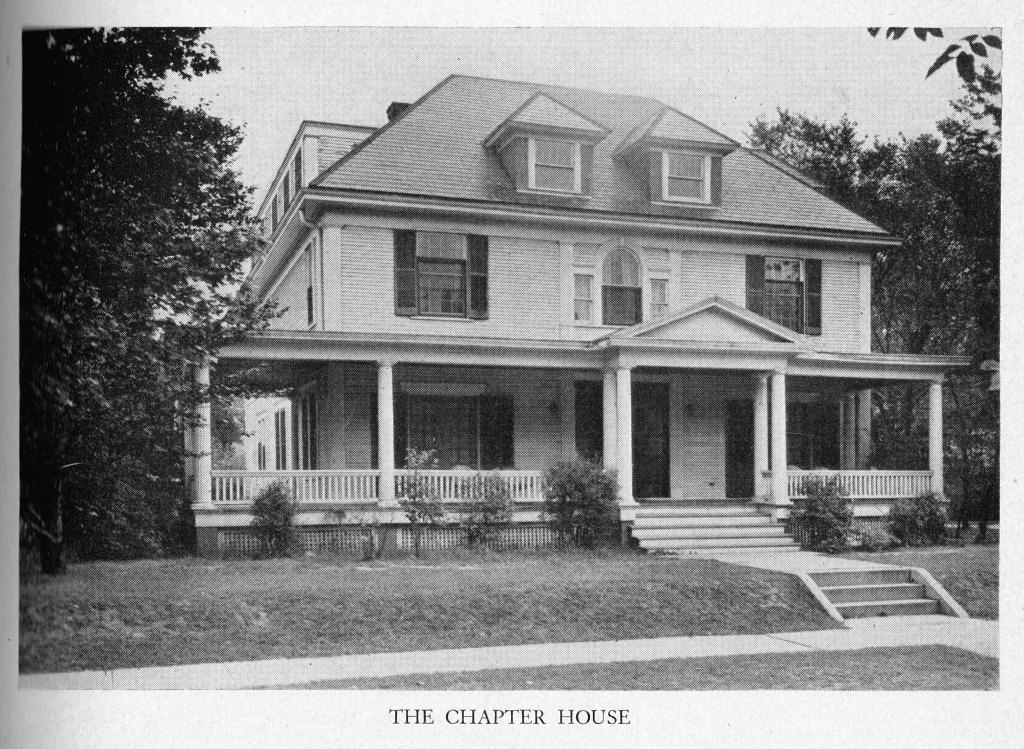
Delta Triton at Purdue, c. 1943

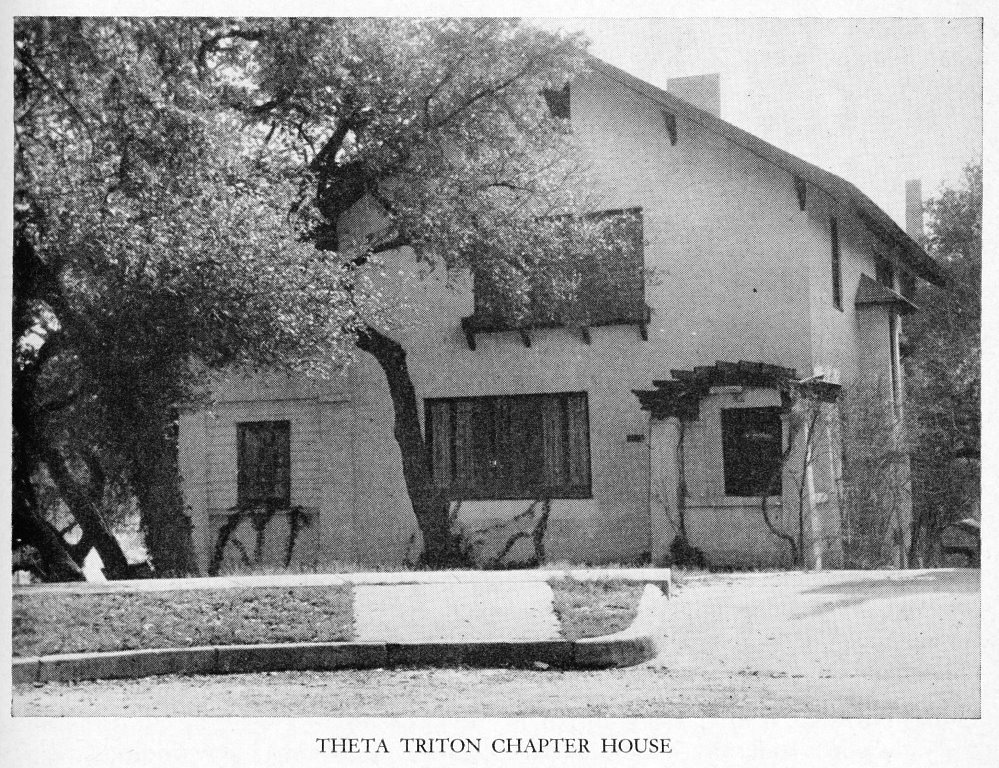
Theta Triton at Texas, c. 1949

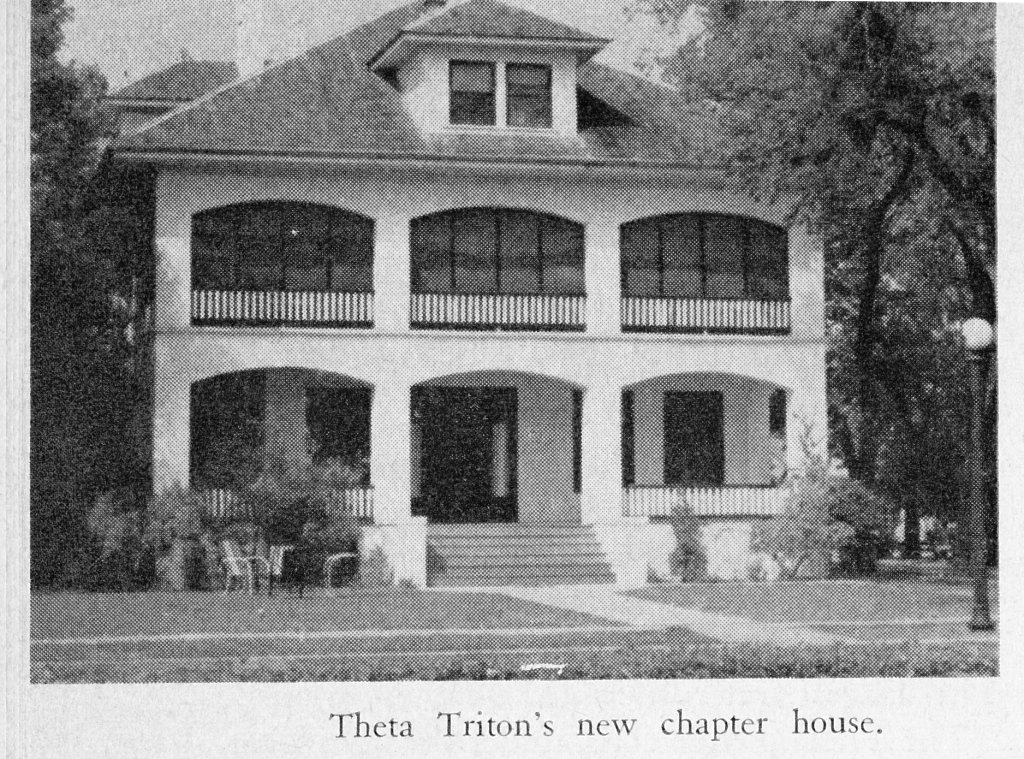
Theta Triton at Texas, c. 1950

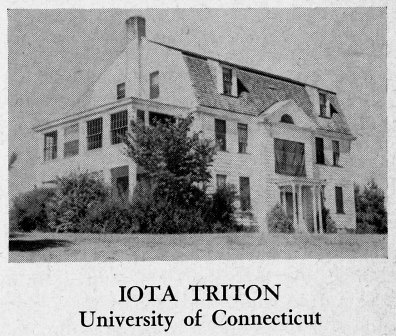
Iota Triton at UConn, c. 1949

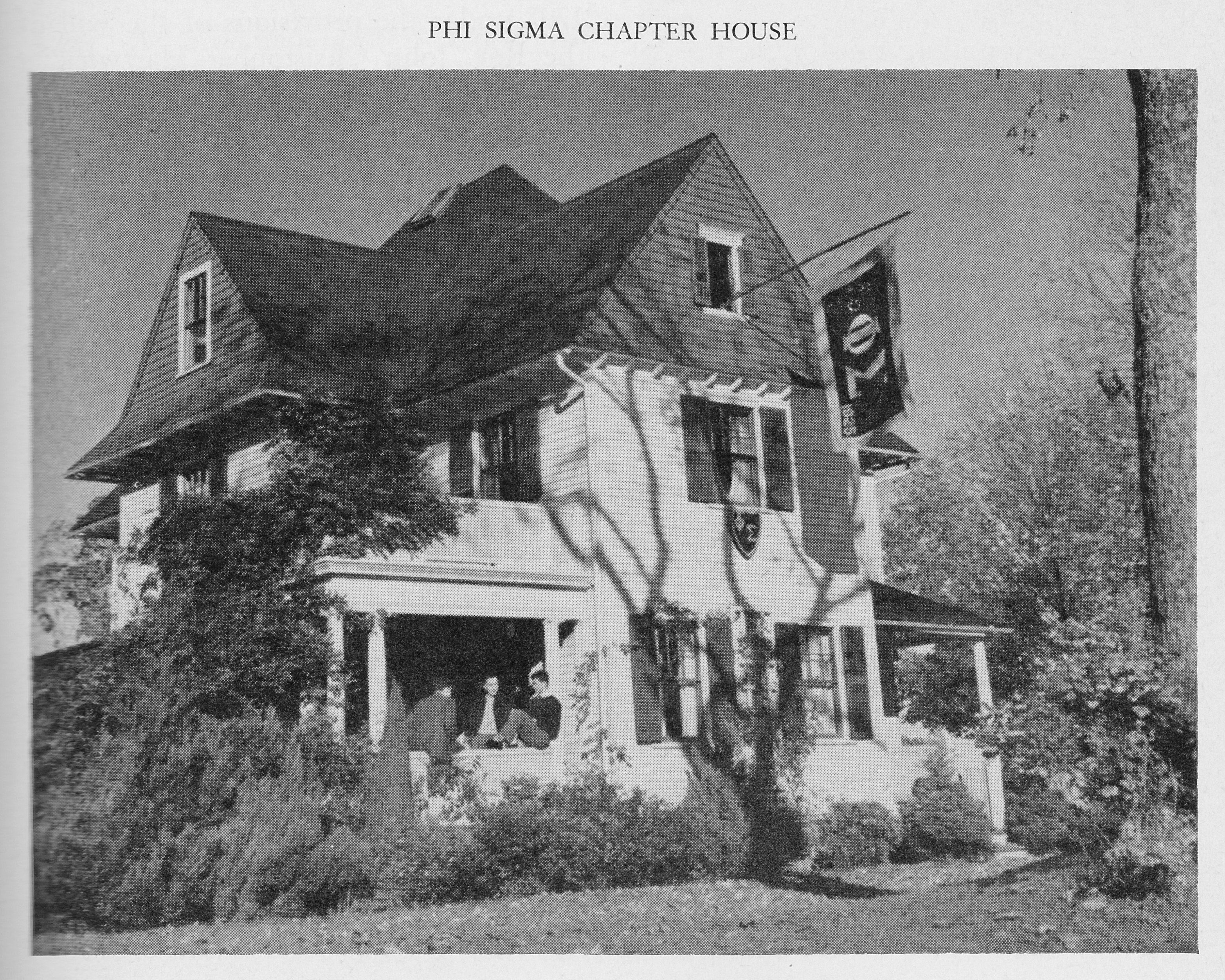
Lambda Triton at Rhode Island, c. 1948

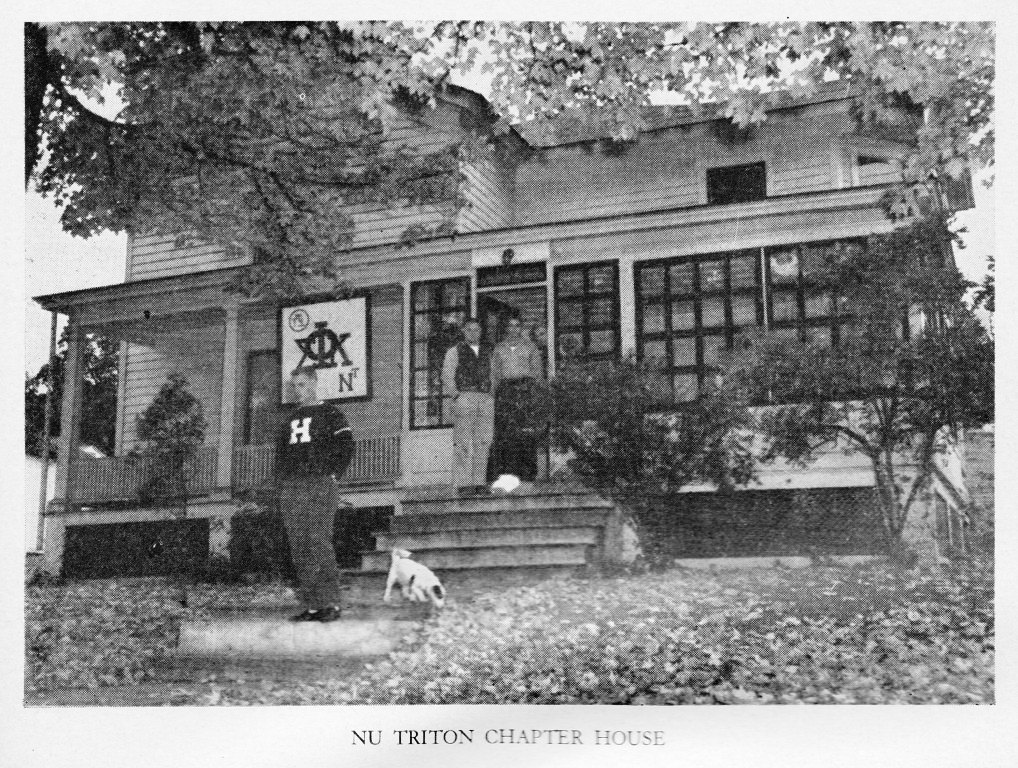
Nu Triton at Hartwick, c. 1948

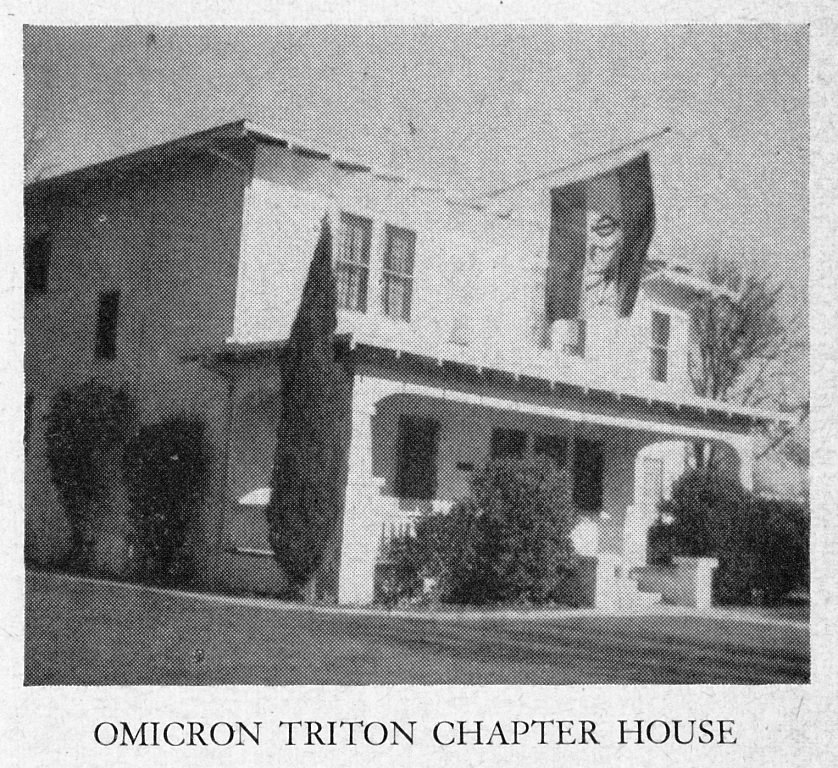
Omicron Triton at UC Davis, circa 1949

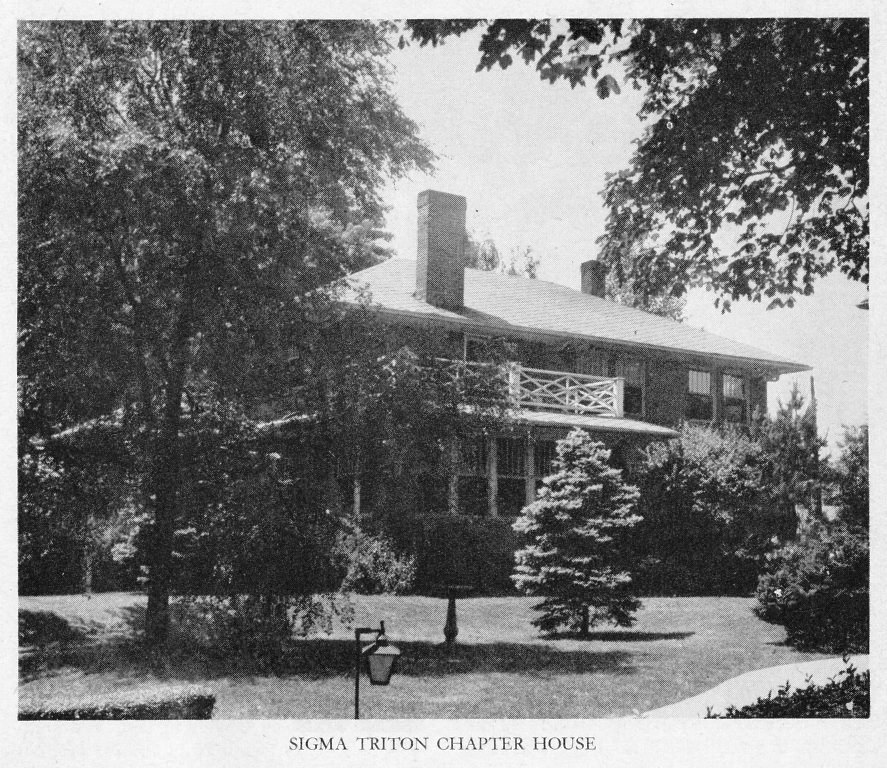
Sigma Triton at Indiana, c. 1949 (former)

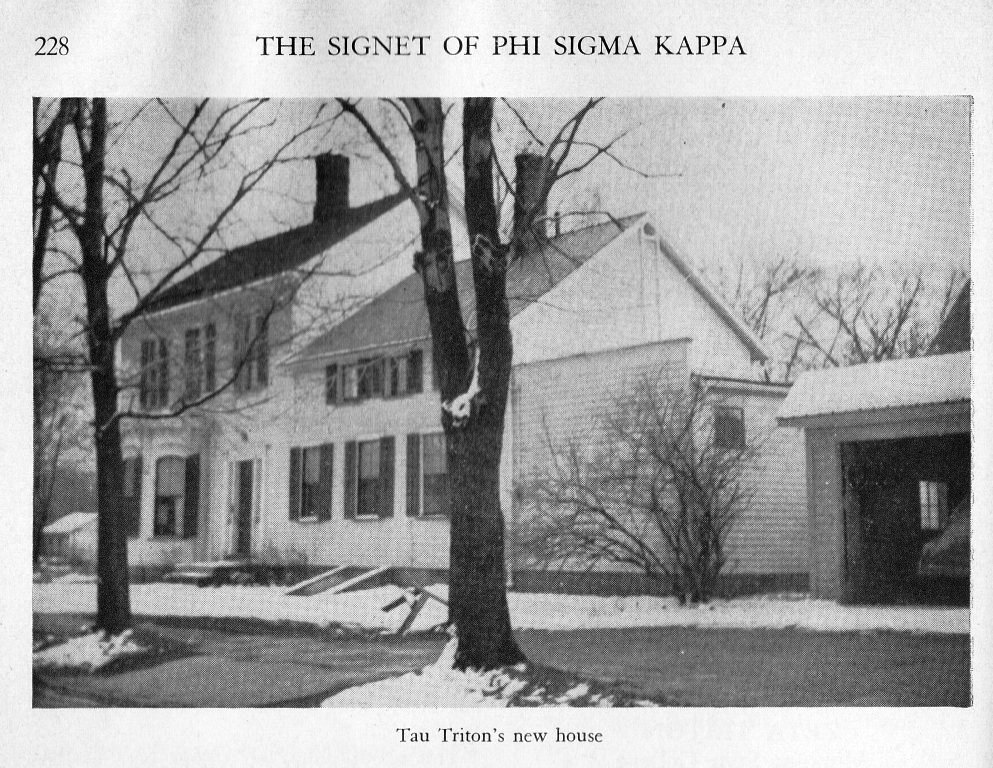
Tau Triton at Baldwin-Wallace, c. 1952

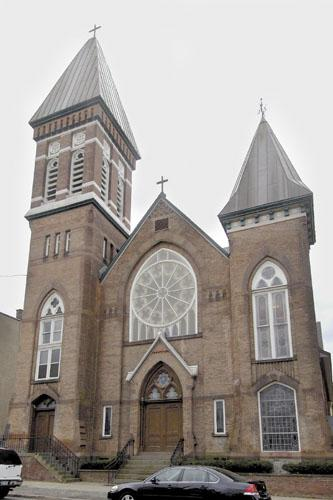
Gamma Tetarton at Rensselaer Poly, 2013

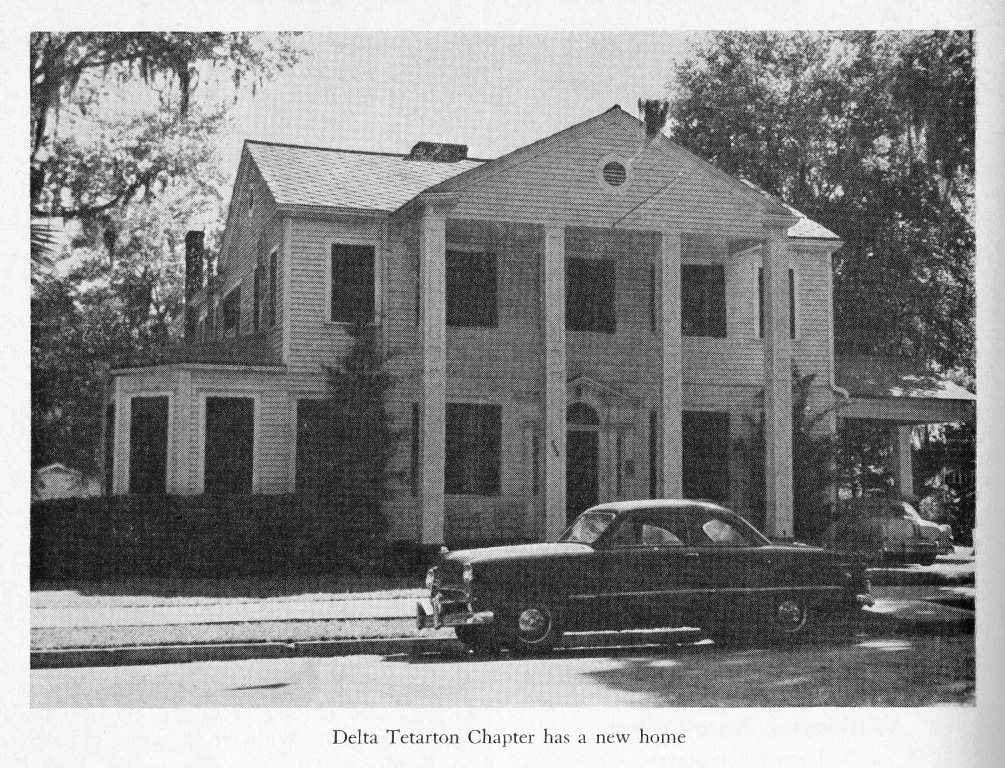
Delta Tetarton at Florida, c. 1952

== Organization and legal status ==
Phi Sigma Kappa is divided into three distinct entities: Phi Sigma Kappa fraternity, Phi Sigma Kappa Foundation, and Phi Sigma Kappa Properties. The Phi Sigma Kappa International Headquarters is staffed by administrators who handle many of the day-to-day operations in the fraternity as well as coordinate and plan many events, meetings, and other programs held by the Grand Chapter and the Foundation.

=== Phi Sigma Kappa fraternity ===
Management of the fraternity (PSK) on a day-to-day basis is vested in the executive director, Joe Kern. He and twelve full-time staff members support all aspects of chapter operations, expansion, alumni relations, program development, risk management, and event coordination. Phi Sigma Kappa's Grand Council operates as its volunteer board of directors, composed of one grand president and six directors who guide the fraternity's future and ensure the implementation of its policies.

Regional Advisers are liaisons between the fraternity's national officers and undergraduates.

Local Chapter Advisors often serve as another key point of contact between Regional and National staff or volunteers, to the local chapter.

Some individual Phi Sigma Kappa chapters may work with local alumni- or parent-led housing corporations of their own to manage chapter housing or may work with Phi Sigma Kappa Properties to achieve this same purpose. Local chapter house corporations are separate legal entities from the national structure.

=== Phi Sigma Kappa Foundation ===
The Foundation (PSKF), incorporated as an entity separate from the Grand Chapter in 1947, serves as the financial backbone of the fraternity. It is facilitated by a board of trustees which appropriates funds for various programs and scholarships administered by the Grand Council. The money for this comes from member dues, pledges, and donations. The Foundation is immensely important to the growth and maintenance of the fraternity. Some of the programs it funds are the Leadership School, Undergraduate Scholarships, the Grand Chapter website, and Regional Conclaves.

=== Phi Sigma Kappa Properties ===
Phi Sigma Kappa Properties (PSKP) is the newest of the three Phi Sigma Kappa entities but plans to become a full-service real estate management and development corporation. PSKP held a long-range planning meeting in August 2005, which was facilitated by Grand Council Director Tim Vojtasko. The organization developed a set of five long-range goals for the next five years and beyond. Those goals include:

- To become the largest (assets owned and managed) property management organization in the fraternity world
- To double the number of houses owned by a PSK-related entity; also 40 houses (owned and managed) in 5 years
- To hire an executive director/CFO with a complete staff of 5 within 5 years
- To develop a world-class model for owning, managing, and financing fraternity properties
- To be able to offer all PSK-related properties the opportunity to be owned and/or managed by PSKP

== Membership ==
Membership in Phi Sigma Kappa is available to male students attending a college, university, technical institute, or community college with a Phi Sigma Kappa chapter, provided the man is not a member of a nationally recognized social collegiate fraternity. This opportunity extends not only to undergraduates but also to faculty, graduate students, and former students. Membership is also possible at a chapter elsewhere than the man's place of higher education if his school lacks a chapter. Additionally, honorary membership is provided for in the Constitution and Bylaws of the Grand Chapter of Phi Sigma Kappa. Specific requirements for membership may vary between places of higher education and chapters but minimum requirements are nationally legislated. Membership in Phi Sigma Kappa can be dissolved only by death or expulsion.

=== Degrees of membership ===
- First Degree: members of undergraduate chapters
- Second Degree: members elected to symbolic offices
- Third Degree: alumni and those initiated as graduates, former students, faculty, or honorary members
- Fourth Degree: members appointed to an office by the Grand Council or Grand President, past or present
- Fifth Degree: members elected to the Grand Council, past or present
- Sixth Degree: members who have been elected Grand President, past or present

== See also ==
- Phi Sigma Epsilon
- Sigma Phi Sigma
