= Anthonie Rouwenhorst Mulder =

Dutch engineer (1848–1901)

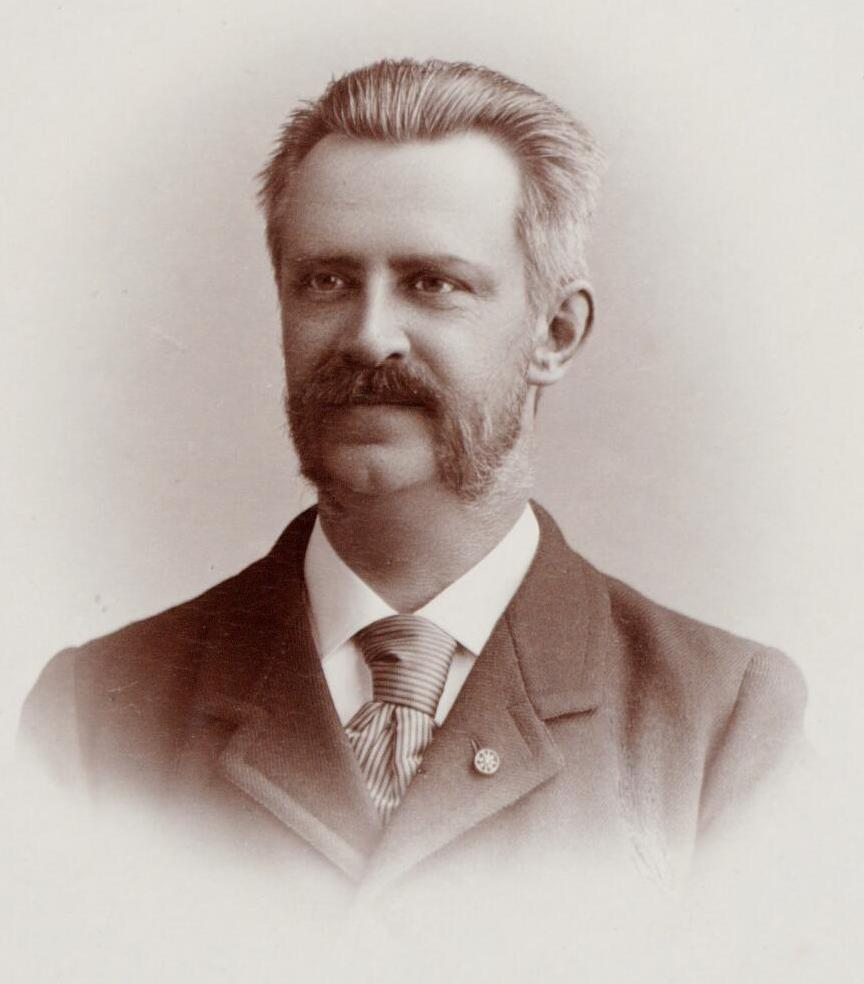
- Anthonie Rouwenhorst Mulder, c. 1890-1901
- Born: 28 April 1848; Leiden, Netherlands
- Died: 6 March 1901 (aged 52); Nijmegen, Netherlands
- Education: Polytechnische School te Delft
- Known for: Hydraulic engineering works in Meiji-era Japan; The Ververskingskanaal in The Hague
- Awards: Order of the Sacred Treasure (1888)
- Scientific career
- Fields: Civil engineering Hydraulic engineering
- Workplaces: Rijkswaterstaat; Home Ministry of the Empire of Japan

Anthonie Thomas Lubertus Rouwenhorst Mulder (28 April 1848 – 6 March 1901) was a Dutch engineer and foreign advisor specializing in hydraulic engineering during the Meiji period in the Empire of Japan. He was responsible for the design and construction of two port cities in Japan, at Misumi in Kumamoto and Moji-ku.

After graduation he worked in the Netherlands and Egypt before travelling to Japan in 1879, where was employed along with nine other Dutch engineers as a member of the group of western experts and advisors, known in Japanese as O-yatoi Gaikokujin (Kyūjitai: 御雇い外國人, Shinjitai: 御雇い外国人, 'hired foreigners'), who were brought to the country by the Japanese Government in order to modernise and improve the country's infrastructure.

Rouwenhorst Mulder designed and oversaw various river and hydraulic engineering projects in Japan, and planned adaptations to the Port of Tokyo involving river separation and deepening works. He spent 11 years in the country, returning to the Netherlands in 1890. In addition to the works he carried out in the Netherlands, Egypt and Japan, he published a number of reports on his work and hydraulic engineering subjects. For his achievements in Japan, he was appointed as an Officer of the Order of the Sacred Treasure in 1888.

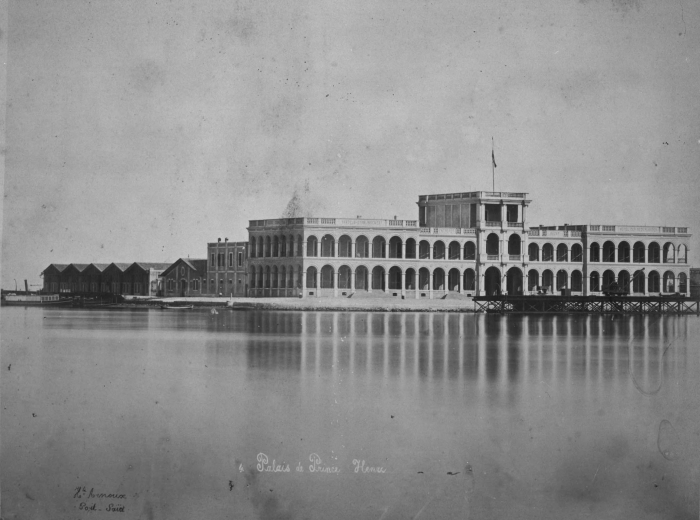
The Dutch trading establishment and the Hotel der Nederlanden in the port of Port Said

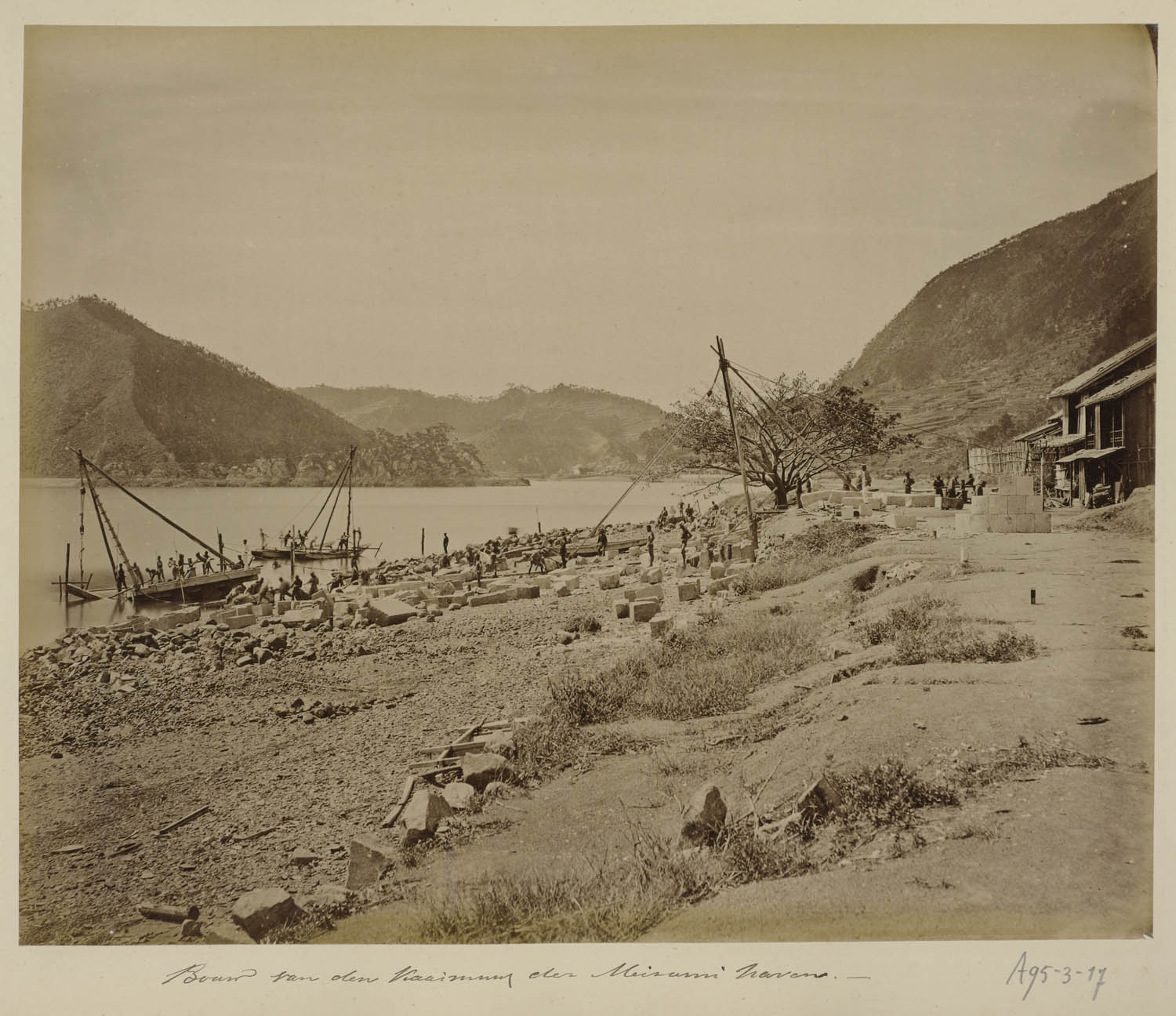
Construction of the quay wall at the Port of Misumi

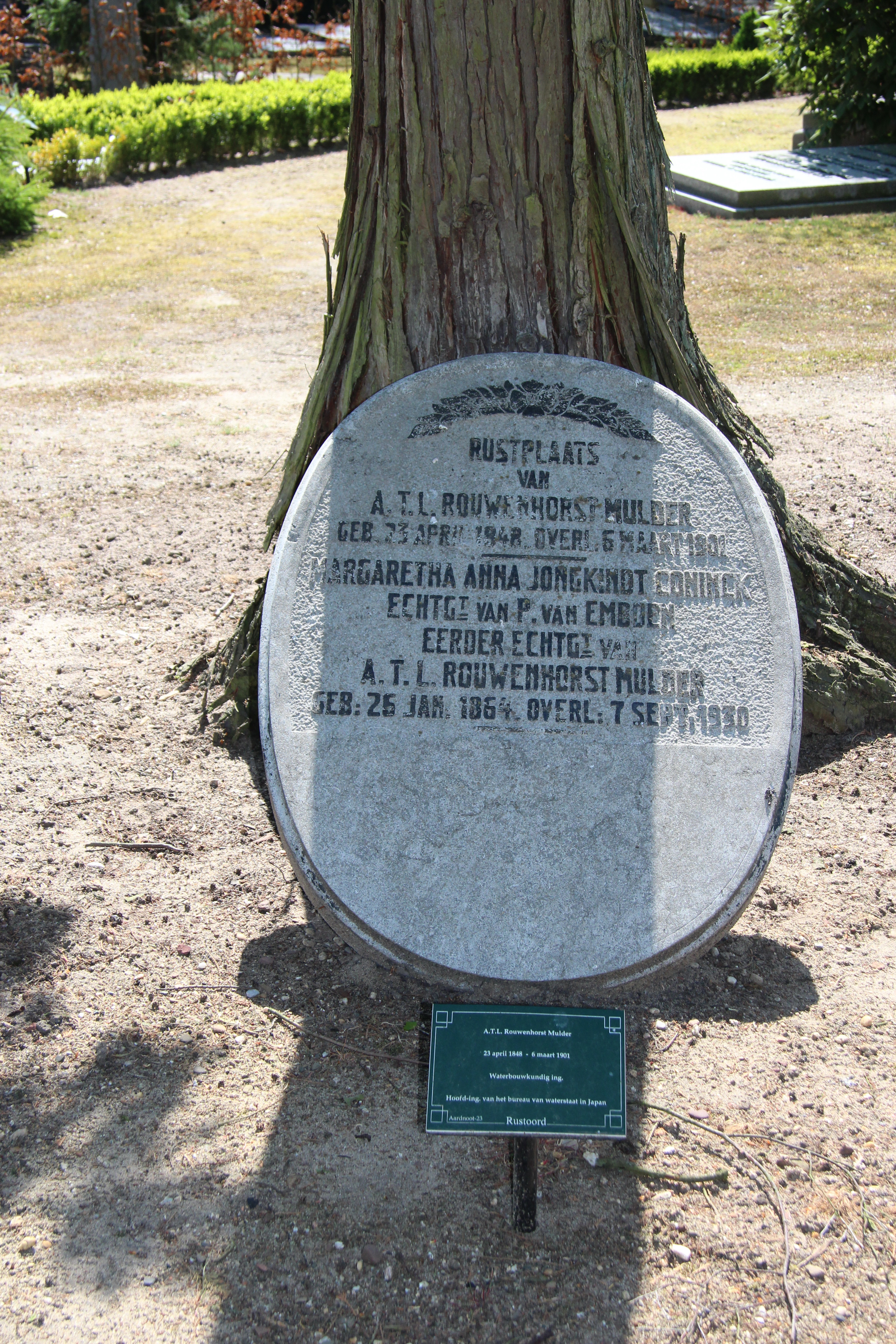
Rouwenhorst Mulder's grave in Nijmegen

== Life and career ==
Rouwenhorst Mulder was born in Leiden, the son of tobacco trader A.T.L. Rouwenhorst Mulder and his wife A.C.E. d’Ailly, in 1848. He attended primary school in Leiden and later in Alkmaar, before completing his secondary education in Haarlem, and then studied from 1867 to 1872 at the Polytechnic School in Delft (now TU Delft), graduating as a civil engineer in 1872. Upon graduation, worked for Rijkswaterstaat as a supervisor on the River Waal at Herwijnen. However, after only one year, he was invited by Prince Henry, the son of King William II, to establish a trading post at the northern entrance to the Suez Canal, near Port Said in Egypt.

=== Egypt ===
Although his contemporaries advised against the venture, Rouwenhorst Mulder took up the position. He lived in Egypt from August 1873 to August 1876, and built the main house, a warehouse, a coal shed, a goods shed, service residences, two piers and the foundation for a water reservoir as well as a hotel. The trading post proved commercially successful, but the venture was terminated after Prince Henry's unexpected death on 13 January 1879, with the operations being discontinued and the properties sold.

=== The Verversingskanaal in The Hague ===
Rouwenhorst Mulder returned to the Netherlands in 1876, where he built the Verversingskanaal (English: refreshing canal), which was conceived to flush the canals in The Hague,

=== Japan ===
Rouwenhorst Mulder was then recruited by the government of Japan in late 1879, working alongside nine other Dutch civil engineers (Cornelis Johannes van Doorn, Isaac Lindo, George Arnold Escher, Johannis de Rijke, Dick Arnst, Alphonse Thissen, Johannes Westerwiel, Josinus Kalis and Arie van Mastrigt). He was responsible for improvements to the course of the Tone River, Kinugawa River, Fuji River, Yodo River and the Sumida River. He became known in Japan as a specialist in the redesign and improvements of ports and harbours. At the Port of Tokyo, he proposed separating the harbour from the river by means of a dam at the river Samida-gawa, and constructing a tidal basin with an area of 1,400 hectares.

He also drafted improvement plans for other ports including those in Okayama, Hiroshima, Hachinohe and Shimonoseki. His contemporaries in Japan included Cornelis Johannes van Doorn, Johannis de Rijke and George Arnold Escher. For his work in Japan, Rouwenhorst Mulder was awarded the Order of the Sacred Treasure in 1888.

=== Return to the Netherlands ===
After his contract in Japan expired in 1890, Rouwenhorst Mulder returned to The Hague. In 1895, he was appointed as a member of a committee tasked with establishing a fishing harbour at Scheveningen, for which he prepared a detailed design. In 1897, he moved to Nijmegen where he designed a steam-powered tram system for the city. In 1898, he was requested to assess a design by a Russian engineer in order to implement a similar tram system in Saint Petersburg. He died in Nijmegen in 1901.

== Personal life ==
Rouwenhorst Mulder married Margaretha Anna Jongkindt Connick on 29 April 1891 in Wageningen. He died in 1901 and was buried at Rustoord cemetery in Nijmegen.

== Legacy ==
On 8 May 1990, Hitoshi Yoshida, the mayor of Misumi (Hamada, Japan) visited Leiden and unveiled a commemorative stone on the site of the house where Rouwenhorst Mulder was born in 1848. In Japan, there is a monument to Rouwenhorst Mulder beside the Tone Canal, which Willem-Alexander of the Netherlands visited in 2010.

== Selected papers by Rouwenhorst Mulder ==
- Het Nederlandse handelsetablissement te Port Saïd (“The Dutch trading establishment at Port Said”) in Tijdschrift van het Koninklijk Instituut van Ingenieurs (Journal of the Royal Institute of Engineers) (1876–1877), p. 287 (PDF pp. 262–265 and 355–358 (plates)).
- Korte mededelingen over Japan en meer bepaald over de voornaamste havens die in dat rijk gevonden worden (“Short notes on Japan, and more particularly on the principal harbours found in that country”) in Tijdschrift van het Koninklijk Instituut van Ingenieurs (Journal of the Royal Institute of Engineers) (1887–1888), p. 91 (PDF pp. 238–244 and 336–347 (figures and maps)).
- Over een drietal zeestraten in den Japanschen archipel (“On a trio of straits in the Japanese archipelago”) in Tijdschrift van het Koninklijk Instituut van Ingenieurs (Journal of the Royal Institute of Engineers) (1892–1893), p. 205 + plate 21–24; PDF pp. 451–470.

== Bibliography ==
- L.A. van Gasteren (2000). In een Japanse stroomversnelling; berichten van Nederlandse watermannen, rijswerkers, ingenieurs, werkbazen 1872-1903 (In Japanese rapids, messages from Dutch 'Watermen' ) (2000, Walburg Pers). ISBN 9789057300769
- von Graaf, Rutger (2008). Urban Water in Japan CRC Press. ISBN 9780415453608
