= Rudolf Escher =

Dutch composer and music theorist (1912–1980)

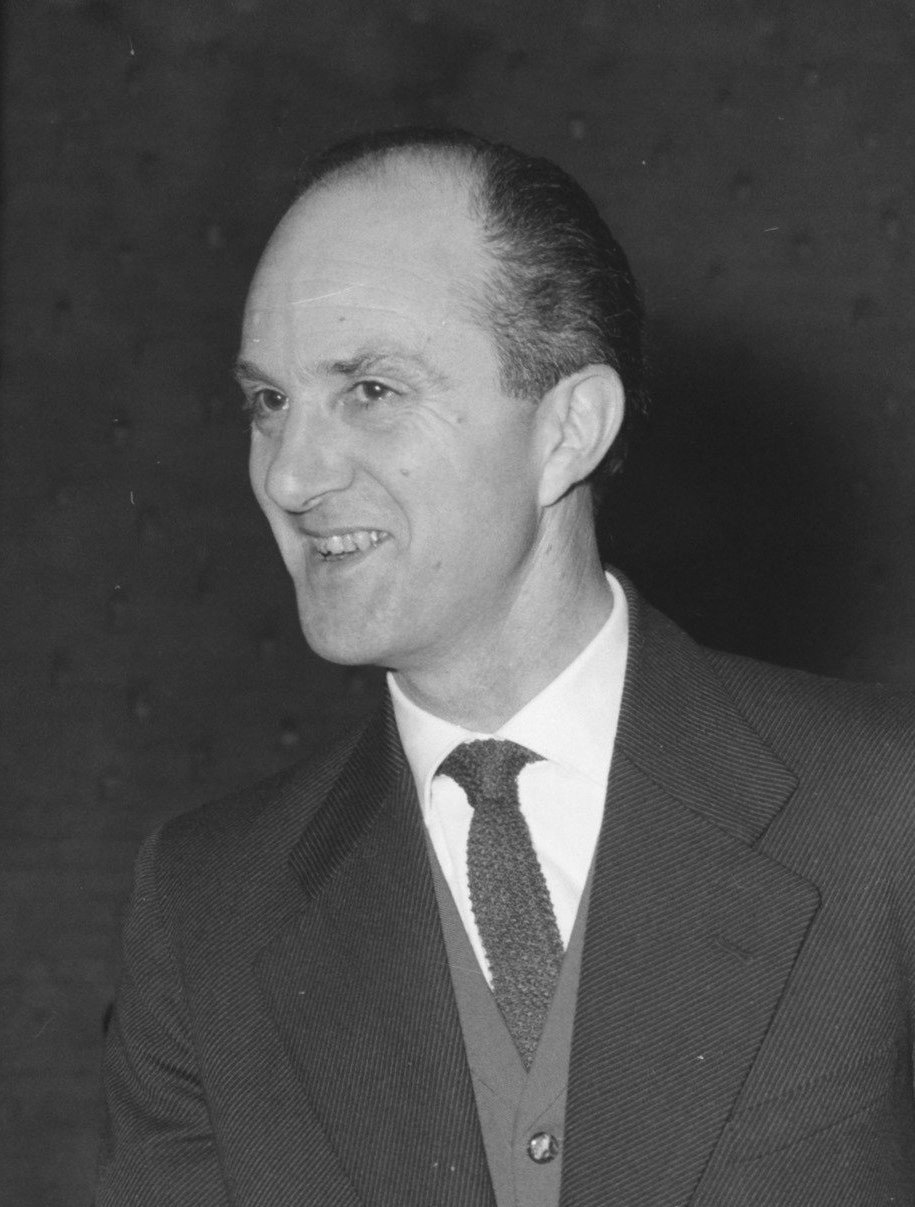
Escher (1960)

Rudolf Escher (8 January 1912 in Amsterdam – 17 March 1980 in De Koog) was a Dutch composer and music theorist. He left compositions for chamber orchestra and orchestra, vocal and one electronic composition. Escher was also a poet, painter and writer.

== Biography ==
=== Youth ===
Escher was born the son of the geologist and mineralogist Berend George Escher and the Swiss Emma Brosy. His father was a son of the engineer George Arnold Escher and half-brother of the graphic artist Maurits Cornelis Escher. At the age of four, Escher moved with his family to Batavia, Dutch East Indies, where his father worked as a geologist for the Batavian Petroleum Company. His father was a good pianist and he gave the young Escher piano lessons.

=== Study ===
In 1922, five years later, they were back in the Netherlands, now in Leiden. Escher went to the Stedelijk Gymnasium Leiden and continued his piano lessons, now with Bé Hartz. He also played the violin and got harmony lessons. After four years he quit school. At first he could not choose between music, visual arts and letters but in 1929 he decided to become a composer. Next he wanted to go to the conservatoire in Cologne. The Dutch composer Peter van Anrooy advised him to study piano. On second thoughts Escher went to the Toonkunst Conservatoire in Rotterdam in 1931. Until 1937 he studied the piano as major with the cello as minor. From 1934 to 1937 he also studied composition with Willem Pijper as his teacher. Escher's debut was in 1935 with his First piano sonata. He also attracted attention in 1938 with an important essay: Toscanini and Debussy, magic of reality. In this essay his views towards composing are evident. He also wrote a few poems, which were published in Forum.

=== Work ===
When the Second World War expanded into the Netherlands, many of Escher's compositions from his study period were destroyed in the bombing of Rotterdam on 14 May 1940. He also lost his house and all his possessions.

During the war Escher composed Musique pour l'esprit en deuil (1941–43). This work quickly elevated him to be the most important composer in the Netherlands. About the compositions from the war, he wrote: 'My work from this period has got a sort of gravity, a doggedness here and there, which makes it clearly to realize as grown amid disasters. For me, personally, that is the ethical significance of it: they are constructions of the mind, in a time that 'mind' (if you can still call it that way) is used almost exclusively for destructive purposes.’

Soon after the war Escher was a contributor about visual arts and music for the weekly Groene Amsterdammer. He turned out to be a talented poet, publishing poetry in literary magazines into the 1950s. Socially he had little to complain about; he was offered several administrative functions, his compositions were successfully performed, and his publications were followed with interest.

After 1946 Escher befriended the Dutch composer Matthijs Vermeulen. They shared the same social and literary interests and communist ideals. They had enough trust in each other so that they could write critically about the others' compositions. Escher's communist ideals were expressed in his membership of the Communist Party (from 1934 to 1940). He wrote a few critiques for the monthly communist periodical Politics and Culture, using the pseudonym A. Leuvens. During the 1950s he became critical of Russian communism, which he considered a failure. What remained was his leftist political orientation.

In 1958 Escher was present at the 32nd ISCM festival in Strasbourg. About this he wrote reviews to his friend and composer-colleague Peter Schat. In 1960 he was present at the ISCM festival in Cologne. Here he got excited about Pli selon pli of Pierre Boulez. Thus Escher began experimenting with electronic music and serialism in the 1960s. He took lessons in the technique of electronic music with lectures in elementary sound mechanics, electro-physics and sound technology in Delft. Afterwards he experimented in the Studio for Electronic Music in Delft and then at the Institute of Sonology in Utrecht. He decided to ask for analysis classes with Boulez, with reference to the piece he heard in Cologne. From 3 to 7 November 1960 he visited Boulez in Baden-Baden. Those days were spent on analyzing Improvisations sur Mallarmé I & II of Boulez. At last Escher concluded that the techniques did not feel right for him. Nevertheless, in his Wind Quintet from 1967 serial music can be found. He uses structure formulas that remind a listener of Boulez. His visit led a few weeks later to a purification of his works: He wrote a request to the director of the publisher Donemus to remove four works unconditionally and three with some restrictions.

In 1960–61 Escher gave lessons at the Conservatoire of Amsterdam. He used his experience with Boulez to give a lecture on "the meaning of structure and form by Debussy with reference to recent serial composition techniques by Boulez." He became Scientific Senior Lecturer at the Institute for Musicology at the University of Utrecht from 1964 to 1977. His specialization was 'Aspects of the twentieth century'. He gave a lecture "characteristic structure- and form criteria in the music of the twentieth century." Besides music theory he also explored the world of music as a semantic sign system and Audiology.

=== Legacy ===
Escher died at the age of 68 in De Koog on the Frisian Island Texel.

In 1980 his friends and experts united to create the Escher Committee. Among others involved were Willem Boogman, Elmer Schönberger and Dirk Jacob Hamoen. With the help of the committee the widow of the composer compiled a catalog with comments of Escher's works.

In 1992 the Centrum Nederlandse Muziek published correspondence between Escher and the composer Peter Schat, 33 letters and postcards written between 13 May 1958 and 5 August 1961. In the letters they talked about compositions of others as well as their own, and they discussed issues in aesthetics and music theory. The letters give insight to Dutch history, aesthetics, and theory of the 20th-century music, from the inception to the reception of serialism.

In the year of the publication of the correspondence Peter Schat published a letter to the dead Escher. In the letter Schat described the process of change that was happening in that time. He also notified Escher about the existing state of affairs in the Netherlands.

In 1999 David Moore wrote that Escher is one of the most prominent Dutch composers of the previous generation. Leo Samama was also laudatory when we mentioned Escher's work: "Together with the 'Sinfonia per dieci strumenti' (1973/75), the 'Flute sonata' (1976/79) and the 'Trio for clarinet, viola and piano' (1978/79), the 'Wind Quintet' belongs to the works of a master – one of the few our country has known - of an artist that has developed such a personal language, a personal grammar, a personal sound, that every statement about French or German influences, about old or new music, about place and time are futile and meaningless."

There is a foundation named after Escher for young composers. Since 2006 the foundation is in the management at the Prins Bernard Culture Foundation. The Rudolf Escher Composers Foundation supports young composers financially to follow a study in the Netherlands or abroad. It also supports projects where the work of a young (Dutch) composers is being performed and of concerts where works of Escher are being performed. The foundation is funded by the board of the Rudolf Escher Committee and the inheritance of Escher.

=== Prizes ===
Escher received several prizes for his compositions during his live. In 1946 he got the Music prize of the city of Amsterdam for his orchestral work Musique pour l'esprit en deuil, yet before the first performance sounded. One year later he received the Dutch Government Prize for the suite for piano Arcana. He also received the Music price of the city of Amsterdam for Le vrai visage de la paix for choir a cappella. For Le tombeau de Ravel he got the Prof. Van der Leeuw Prize in 1959. Twice he could receive the Visser-Neerlandia Prize, for Nostalgies (1961) and the Wind Quintet (1968). Between these prizes he got the Willem Pijper Prize in 1966 for the Sonata concertante for cello and piano. Eventually Escher received the Johan Wagenaar Prize in 1977 for all his works.

== Works ==
=== Orchestral music ===
- 1943 Musique pour l'esprit en deuil
- 1948 Concerto for String Orchestra
- 1951 Hymne du Grand Meaulnes (to be revised as Chant du Grand Meaulnes)
- 1954 Symphony nr. 1 (1953–54)
- 1958 Symphony nr. 2 (revised in 1964 en 1971)
- 1969 Summer Rites at Noon (1962–1969) to be revised
- 1977 Orchestration of Six épigraphes antique (Claude Debussy) (1975–1977)

=== Chamber music ===
- 1935 Sonata No. 1 for piano
- 1937 Passacaglia for organ
- 1943 Sonata concertante for cello and piano
- 1944 Sonata for two flutes op.8
- 1944 Arcana suite for piano (formerly Arcana Musae Dona)
- 1946 Trio d'anches for oboe, clarinet and bassoon
- 1949 Due Voci for piano
- 1949 Non Troppo ten easy pieces for piano
- 1949 Sonata for flute solo op.16
- 1951 Sonatina for piano
- 1952 Le tombeau de Ravel
- 1953 Air pour charmer un lézard op.28 for flute solo
- 1959 Trio for violin, viola en cello
- 1967 Wind Quintet Quintetto a fiati
- 1969 Monologue for flute
- 1973 Sonata for clarinet solo
- 1976 Sinfonia per dieci instrumenti
- 1978 Sonata for flute and piano (1975–78)
- 1978 Trio for clarinet, viola and piano.

=== Vocal music ===
- 1951 Chants du désir (Quatre Poèmes de Louise Labé) for mezzo and piano
- 1951 Nostalgies (H.J.M. Levet) for tenor and orchestra (revised in 1961)
- 1952 Strange meeting (Wilfred Owen) for bariton and piano
- 1953 Le vrai visage de la paix (P. Eluard) for choir a cappella(revised in 1957)
- 1955 Songs of Love and Eternity for choir a cappella
- 1957 Ciel, air et vents (Trois poèmes de Ronsard) for choir a cappella
- 1970 Univers de Rimbaud (Arthur Rimbaud) for tenor and orchestra
- 1975 Three Poems by W.H. Auden for choir a cappella

=== Electronic music ===
- 1960 Electronic Music for 'The Long Christmas Dinner' (Thornton Wilder)

== Articles ==
- Toscanini en Debussy: magie der werkelijkheid (Rotterdam, 1938)
- ‘Maurice Ravel’, Groot Nederland (Amsterdam, 1939)
- ‘Rudolf Escher: Musique pour l'esprit en deuil’, Sonorum speculum, xx (1964), 15–33
- ‘Rudolf Escher: Quintetto a fiati’, Sonorum speculum, xxxiv (1968), 24–32
- ‘Debussy and the Musical Epigram’, Key Notes, no.10 (1979), 59–63
- Debussy: actueel verleden, ed. D. Hamoen and E. Schönberger (Buren, 1985)
- met M.C. Escher: Beweging en metamorfosen: een briefwisseling (Amsterdam, 1985)
- E. Voermans, ed.: Brieven, 1958–1961 (Zutphen, 1992) [briefwisseling tussen Escher en P. Schat]

== Literature ==
- Escher, Beatrijs, ed. Rudolf Escher: het oeuvre, catalogue raisonné. Amsterdam, 1998.
- Samama, Leo. ‘Escher, Rudolf.' Grove Music Online. Oxford Music Online. 19 Januari 2011.
- Samama, Leo. 'Vermeulen, Pijper en Escher – Drie erflaters in de muziek van de twintigste eeuw: drie vrienden.’ Erflaters van de twintigste eeuw. Amsterdam: Querido, 1991: 264–289. [in Dutch]
- Voermans, Erik, ed. Brieven, 1958–1961. Zutphen, 1992. [correspondence between Escher and P. Schat, in Dutch].
