= Johannis de Rijke =

Dutch engineer (1842–1913)

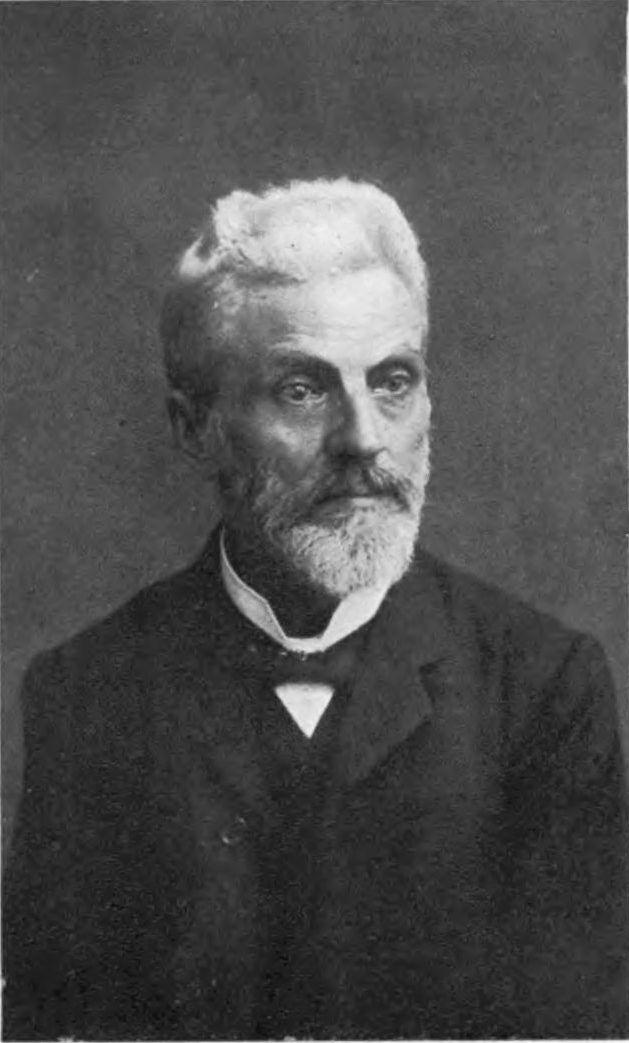
- Johannis de Rijke, c. 1908
- Born: 5 December 1842; Colijnsplaat, Zeeland, the Netherlands
- Died: 20 January 1913 (aged 70); Amsterdam
- Known for: Yokkaichi breakwater Hydraulic engineering works in Meiji-era Japan
- Awards: Order of the Sacred Treasures1889 (4th class); 1892 (3rd class); 1903 (2nd class); Order of Orange-Nassau1911; Order of the Dutch Lion1913; Order of Leopold (Belgium)
- Scientific career
- Fields: Civil engineering Hydraulic engineering
- Workplaces: Home Ministry of the Empire of Japan
- Academic advisors: Jacobus Lebret

Johannis de Rijke (Japanese: ヨハニス・デ・レーケ, Hepburn: Yohanisu de Rēke; 5 December 1842 – 20 January 1913) was a Dutch civil engineer and a foreign advisor to the Japanese government. He made significant contributions to the enhancement of Japan's river systems to improve drainage, flood prevention and navigation, as well as the development of its port facilities, which were important for the rapid economic development that took place in Imperial Japan beginning with the Meiji Restoration in 1868. He also undertook projects in the Netherlands along with significant work in China.

Arriving in Japan in 1873, de Rijke oversaw improvements to the Yodo River in Osaka and the Kiso River in Nagoya. He also played an integral role in civil engineering works at the Yokohama and Kobe ports, with improvements that enabled the ports to become significant hubs of international trade.

The impacts of de Rijke's work in Japan included the mitigation of flood risks, improvements to sewerage networks, enhanced navigational capabilities, and major port works which contributed to improvements in Japan's international trade and transportation. He was awarded the Order of the Sacred Treasures for his achievements.

== Early life and background ==
Johannis de Rijke was born in Colijnsplaat on the island of Noord-Beveland, the third of seven children of Pieter de Rijke, a farmer and part-time dike worker, and his wife, Anna Catharina Liefbroer. Lacking the means for formal education, he was mentored by Jacobus Lebret, the district engineer in Bevelanden.

In 1865, he became chief construction foreman for the Oranjesluizen, a lock complex near Amsterdam, designed to separate the IJ lagoon from the Zuiderzee at Schellingwoude, under the supervision of Cornelis Johannes van Doorn.

In 1873, de Rijke set off from Marseille aboard the steamship Iraouaddy to Shanghai, and then to Nagasaki, along with George Escher and Dick Arnst. De Rijke’s lack of a formal higher-level education was reflected in the status he and his companions were afforded on their voyage, with graduate engineer Escher travelling first class, whilst de Rijke and his family were in second class, and the foreman Arnst was in third class. De Rijke was accompanied by his pregnant wife and their two children, Anna Catharina and Johannes Laurens.

Shortly after arriving in Japan, his wife gave birth to their third child, a son whom they named Pieter. The couple had four more children after this: Eleazer, Els, Jacoba, and Adan. Eleazer died at a young age in Japan. De Rijke’s wife subsequently suffered from ill health, and he sought a qualified tutor for his young family. In 1880, upon Arnst's return to the Netherlands, de Rijke's children accompanied him. They were cared for in the Netherlands by de Rijke’s former mentor Lebret in Oosterbeek. De Rijke’s wife died as the result of cholera in 1881, and his employer granted him six months leave to return to the Netherlands. After his return to Japan, his next period of leave was four years later, when he travelled to the Netherlands via the United States and England.

It was during this period that he met Maria Suzanna Heck, a 25-year-old teacher and devout Calvinist, known for her correspondence with Abraham Kuyper. They married in Amsterdam and had five children: Hendrik, Santina Helenus, Stoffelina, and Wilhelmus. As a committed Calvinist who valued “hard work, honesty and simplicity”, de Rijke joined Kuyper's Anti-Revolutionary Party in 1899. In 1900, Maria and the children moved to the Netherlands. In 1891, De Rijke applied for a position in the Orange Free State (Transvaal) but was not accepted due to the absence of a suitable role.

== Career ==
=== Overview of de Rijke's time in Japan ===
During the period of the Meiji Restoration, the Japanese Government employed western experts and advisors, known in Japanese as O-yatoi Gaikokujin (Kyūjitai: 御雇い外國人, Shinjitai: 御雇い外国人, 'hired foreigners'), in order to modernise and improve the country's infrastructure. The experience of Dutch civil engineers in hydraulic engineering works was sought in order to improve drainage, sewerage, river, port and harbour works across the country, leading to the appointment of ten Dutch civil engineers in Japan between 1872 and 1903.

Cornelis van Doorn and Isaac Lindo were the first two Dutch civil engineers of the group to arrive in Japan, in 1872. Encouraged by van Doorn, de Rijke travelled to Japan to assist in the redesign of the port of Osaka, arriving in September 1873, along with George Arnold Escher. Over the next thirty years, these civil engineers, joined later by Isaac (Jack) Lindo, Anthonie Rouwenhorst Mulder and others, undertook numerous flood control and water management projects. They enhanced the ports of Tokyo, Yokohama, Nagasaki, Ujina (Hiroshima), Hakata (Fukuoka), Mikuni (Sakai), and Niigata. De Rijke's breakwater at Yokkaichi has been recognised by the Japanese government as an Important Cultural Property.

De Rijke was instrumental in the improvement of the riparian zones of various Japanese rivers. His significant contributions included the separation of the Kiso River, Nagara River, and Ibi River near Nagoya, known as the Kiso Three Rivers (木曽三川, Kiso Sansen). The works here included the construction of a polder (known in Japan as a wajū). Elementary schools in Aichi Prefecture conduct a tour of the wajū for students, educating them about its history and the challenges faced in its construction. This programme aims to foster an appreciation of the effort and history behind the creation of the works, and to ensure its legacy is passed on to future generations.

He also supervised works at the Kurobe alluvial fan, located on the Japan Sea coast, and constructed a tunnel from Lake Biwa to Kyoto, where he replaced Escher after the latter returned to the Netherlands. He is credited with establishing the Kanda River sewer network in Tokyo.

In 1891, de Rijke was appointed an Imperial officer of the Meiji Home Ministry, subsequently rising to the position of Vice Minister. He frequently grappled with the challenges of Japanese bureaucracy and corruption, which he found conflicted with his Reformed principles.

As shown in the table below, there were a number of notable Dutch engineers working in Japan between 1872 and 1903, with de Rijke's almost unbroken thirty-year presence in the country (1873 to 1903) being the longest of all. De Rijke's prestigious position in Japan stood in contrast to the potential difficulties that his lack of a formal engineering title would have caused him in the Netherlands.

Notable Dutch civil engineers in Japan (1872 to 1903)
Name	Years active in Japan
Cornelis Johannes van Doorn	1872-1880
Isaac Anne Lindo	1872-1875
George Arnold Escher	1873-1878
Johannis de Rijke	1873-1903
Dick Arnst	1873-1880
Alphonse Th.J.H. Thissen	1873-1877
Johannes Nicolaas Westerwiel	1873-1878
Josinus Aderianus Kalis	1875-1877
Anthonie Rouwenhorst Mulder	1879-1890
Arie van Mastrigt	1879-1881

In 2002, Dutch filmmaker Louis van Gasteren released In een Japanese stroomversnelling (English: In Japanese Rapids) a documentary about de Rijke and Escher. That same year, van Gasteren edited a book of the same name. In 2005 he published Die Eeuwige Rijst met Japansche Thee: Brieven uit Japan van Nederlandse Watermannen, 1872–1903 (English: The Eternal Rice with Japanese Tea: Letters from Japan by Dutch Watermen, 1872–1903), a collection of letters by de Rijke and other Dutch engineers engaged on Japanese hydraulic engineering works at the time.

=== De Rijke's Japanese projects ===
==== Tone River ====
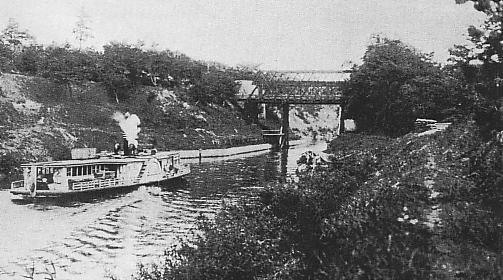
The Tone Canal in 1915

De Rijke's inaugural undertaking in Japan involved the enhancement of the Tone River, which was affected by significant navigability issues arising from siltation. Recognising that the project required detailed topographical survey data, which was not readily available in Japan at the time, de Rijke undertook an extensive levelling project in the area, after fellow Dutch engineer Isaac Lindo had established the Tokyo datum for this purpose.

Whilst levelling was a known concept in Japan, logistical challenges in procuring appropriate survey instruments hampered progress. In a letter dated 7 June 1884, de Rijke noted that "the Japanese still work astonishingly slowly. After a year of measurement, I still cannot even determine the gradient”. De Rijke commenced planning for the project in collaboration with Anthonie Rouwenhorst Mulder in 1887, and it commenced in 1888. With a peak workforce of over 3000 individuals, including penal labour, the work was completed in 1890.

==== Yodo River Regulation ====
Another significant project de Rijke supervised with Escher was the regulation of the Yodo River with the aim of improving navigation between Osaka and Kyoto. The impetus for this project arose from the progressive shallowing of the river at its mouth, attributed to sediment accumulation. This sedimentation, a consequence of soil erosion in upstream mountainous regions, resulted in significant deposition of sediments in the lower stretches of the river and a corresponding delta. Consequently, a contemporary bank protection design was implemented at the points of severe erosion. De Rijke and Escher's solution involved the construction of groynes, drawing inspiration from similar brushwood groynes which had been used in the Netherlands. A Dutch foreman with experience of this type of construction, Johannes Westerwiel, oversaw the work.

A related challenge was deforestation at the summit of Mount Kabatayama, which led to pronounced surface erosion and additional sediment deposition in the river. As a remedial measure, the engineers recommended prohibiting logging activities on the mountain slopes and advocated for the reforestation of the mountain's apex. These interventions, recorded by de Rijke as "the mountain works", proved successful in mitigating the silting issues in the downstream sections of the river. The solution initially comprised the construction of fascine mattresses on the mountain slopes, which de Rijke later improved into hedge-like structures.

The main phase of de Rijke's work at the Yodo River took place between 1875 and 1876, and involved deepening the river channel along the 44 km stretch between Osaka and Kyoto. By installing groynes which altered the currents in the river, de Rijke and Escher ensured the maintenance of the riverbed in periods of low water. During periods of high discharge, the river received flows from nearby land drainage, effectively preventing flooding. The methods employed were similar to techniques which had been used on the Rhine and Meuse rivers in the Netherlands.

The riverbank and groyne construction works were based on the methods used in traditional Dutch fascine mattress designs, assembled and installed under Westerwiel's supervision. Similarly, for the embankment works, a Dutch method involving simpler fascines was employed, overseen by another Dutch foreman, Josinus Kalis. In the absence of traditional Dutch fascine materials such as willow wood and rye straw, locally available materials such as bamboo and rice straw were used. A key aspect of de Rijke's approach was addressing multiple objectives through each project, such as curbing soil erosion, preventing disease, and agricultural enhancement, all within an integrated framework that saw the river's catchment area as a cohesive system requiring balanced water distribution.

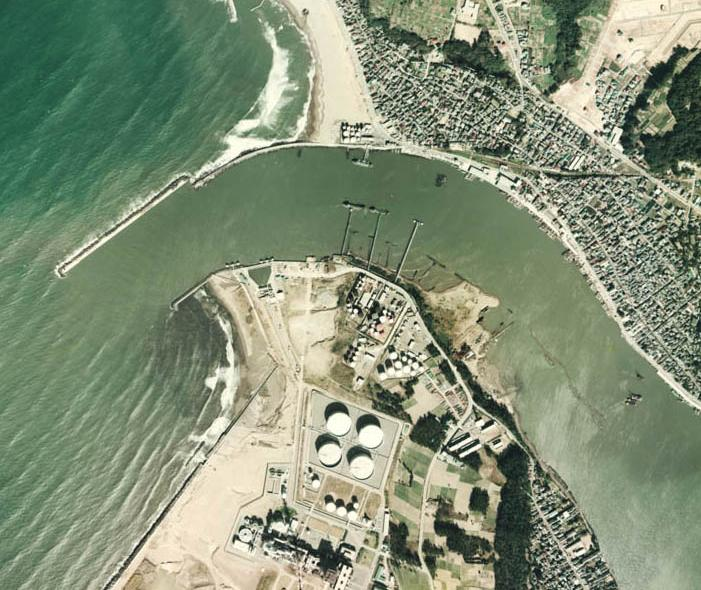
The Mikuni breakwater in 2002 and the mouth of Kuzuryu River

==== Mikuni Harbour Project ====
In the latter half of the 19th century, the port of Mikuni, historically a hub of national trade on the Kitamaebune shipping route, faced a decline due to sediment deposits from the Kuzuryū River. In 1875, locals petitioned the Japanese government for improvements, leading to the involvement of Escher and de Rijke in improvement works.

In 1876, Escher designed a curved breakwater to counteract gravel run-off, and a turning basin with an average water depth of three metres. Escher's plans for the project extended to urban development, including the design of an Elementary school in Mikuni. However, financial constraints and contractual issues led to Escher's return to the Netherlands, and the project remained incomplete.

De Rijke took over the project in 1877, but the challenges of the work were exacerbated by frequent disputes with Japanese executive staff and a cholera outbreak in the summer of 1879. His wife's illness added further personal strain, and necessitated her temporary relocation to Kobe for recuperation. He made significant alterations to Escher's initial plans, including a comprehensive redesign of the breakwater arising from de Rijke's concerns about the budget and the ability of Escher's design to withstand wave overtopping. De Rijke's proposal incorporated five layers of fascine mattresses and timber piles bound by iron chains, and included the addition of four spur dikes. These changes, however, resulted in a tripling of construction costs, imposing a heavy financial burden on the local inhabitants.

In a bid to assuage these issues and generate revenue, the port was opened for trade in 1880 despite the works being incomplete, and large sections of the breakwater were destroyed in 1881 by wave attack. Nonetheless, construction persevered, and the project was finally completed in 1885. The final cost of the work was 7.5 times Escher's original estimate, but the completion of the port reinstated its status as a key trade hub.

One legacy of Escher and de Rijke's work at Minuki included the adoption by Japanese engineers of the fascine mattress technique. The breakwater is referred to locally as "Essuru Tsutsumi" or "Escher's Harbour Dam".

==== Kiso Delta Regulation and Kiso Lock ====
Efforts to regulate flooding and control water management in the Nagara, Ibi and Kiso rivers around the city of Nagoya date back to the Edo period. Between 1878 and 1900, de Rijke undertook extensive research in the region and subsequently developed a plan aimed at segregating the three rivers in the lower stretches of the Kiso Delta. The regulation project was a monumental undertaking, with an estimated cost of 9.74 million yen, a figure representing over 10% of the national budget at the time. The works were complete in 1912.

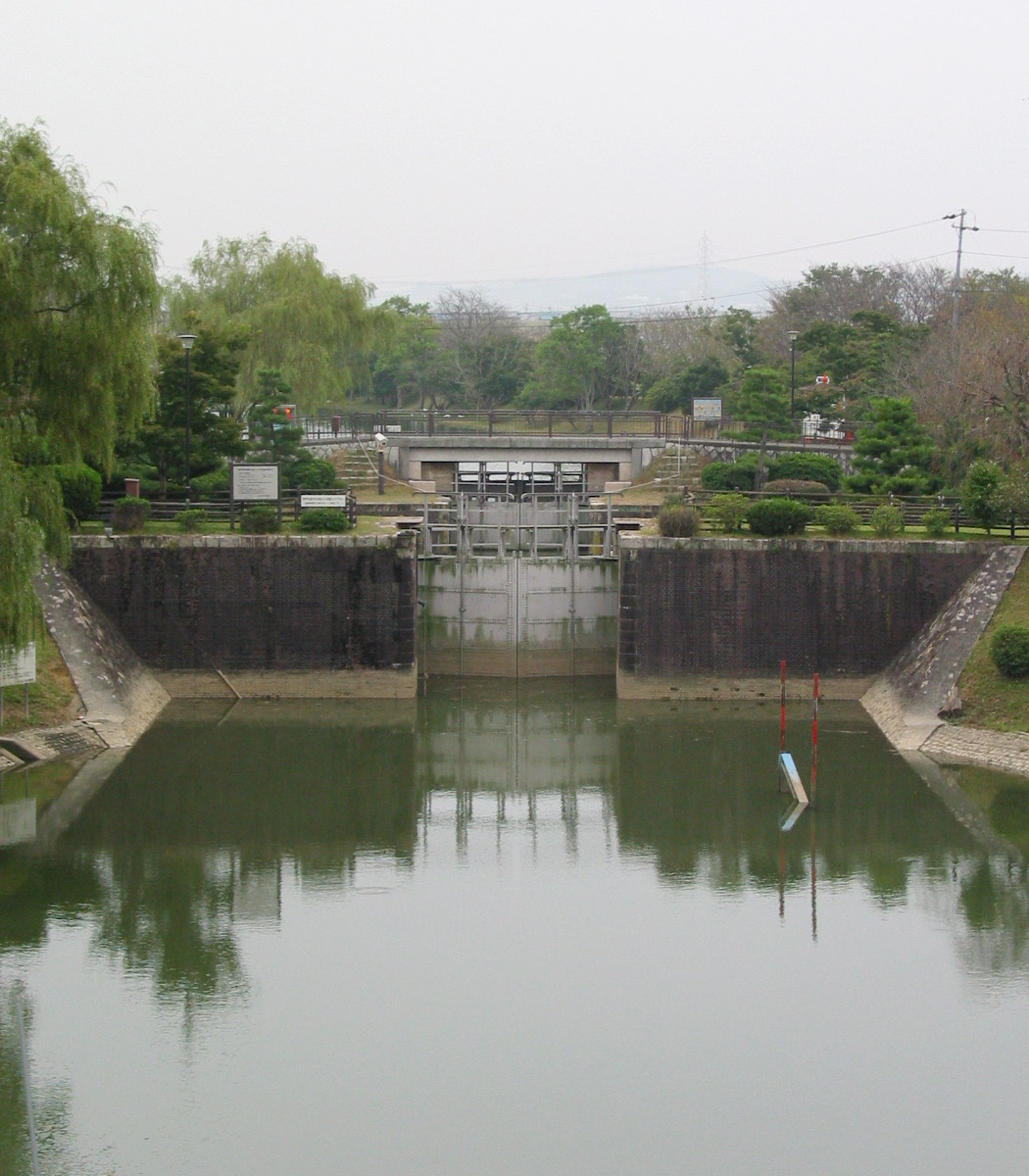
The Kiso lock

The alteration of the confluences of the Kiso River and the Nagara River implemented during the works disrupted the direct shipping route between the rivers, with the difference in water levels between them making navigation impossible. To address this issue, de Rijke proposed the construction of a lock. Construction of the lock commenced in 1892, and upon its completion in 1902, 20,000 ships passed through it. However, as shipping technology progressed and vessel sizes increased, the lock's relevance diminished due to its limited dimensions of 5.5 x 36 metres.

The location of the lock is now the Sendohira River Park, where it stands as a monument commemorating the overall Kiso works. A statue of de Rijke is located near the site.

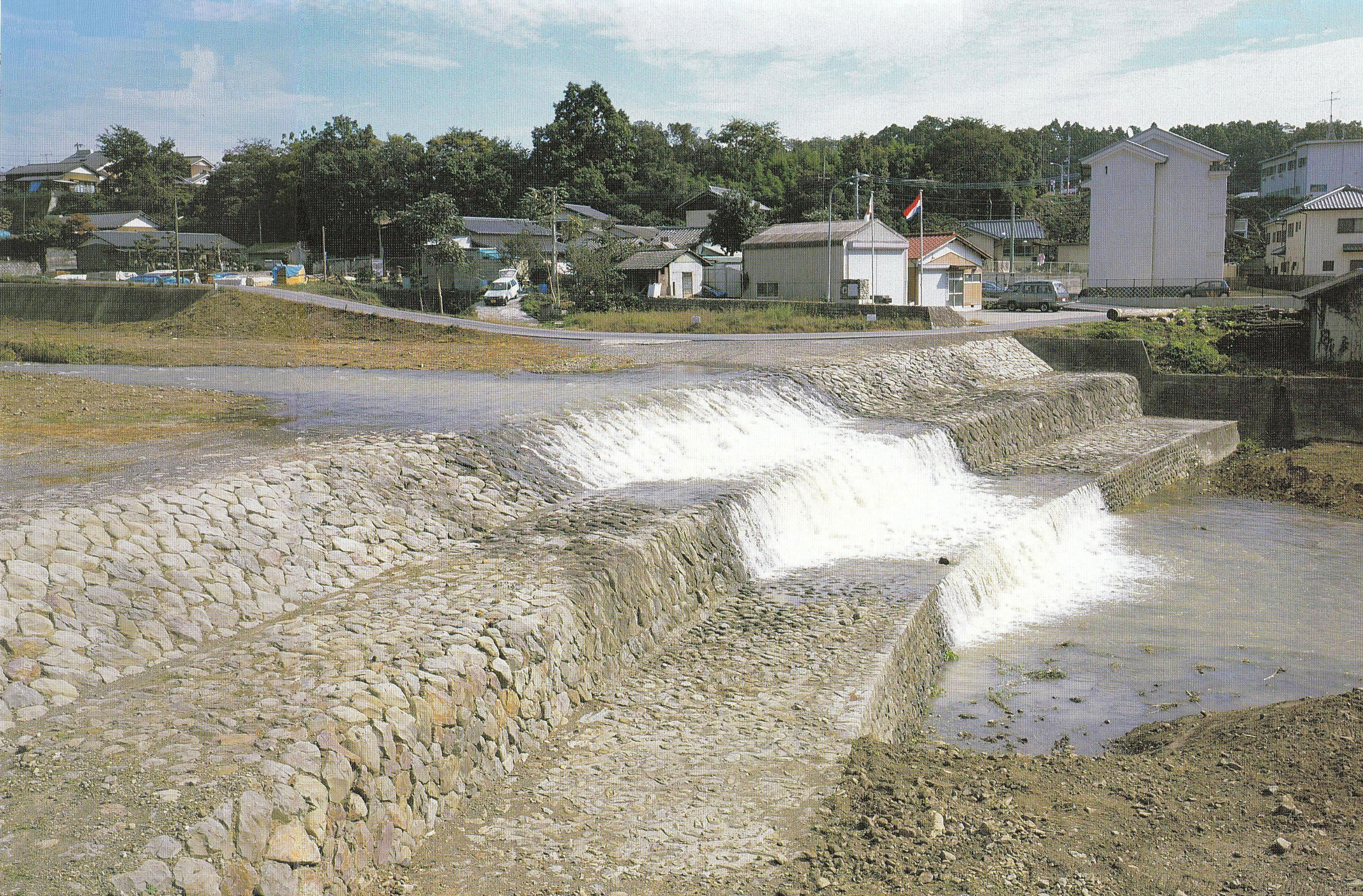
De Rijke's dam in the Otani River at Mima

==== Dam Construction on the Otani River ====
A dam designed and constructed under de Rijke's supervision is situated approximately 1 km upstream from the confluence of the Yoshino and Otani rivers. Construction spanned from 1886 to 1887. The dam is essentially a stepped spillway, and was conceived by de Rijke to prevent erosion. The original dimensions of the dam were 97 metres in length, 12 metres in width, and 3.8 metres in height. Subsequent structural modifications to improve the structural integrity led to a reduction in its length to 60 metres. The Otani River, characteristically dry except during periods of heavy rainfall, transforms into a torrential flow during such events. The dam is one of the few remaining structures in the area that were designed and built under the guidance of de Rijke.

==== The 'Dutch Dams' ====
A 34 metre wide, 7 metre high dam in Otsu-shi was commenced in 1889 to a design by Japanese engineer Tanabe Gisaburo, supervised by de Rijke. This dam is of similar construction to de Rijke's Otani dam, featuring a stepped spillway comprising twenty tiers. It was constructed using granite blocks, each measuring 120 cm in length, 55 cm in width and 35 cm in height. In recognition of its historical and engineering significance, it was accorded the status of an industrial heritage site by the Japanese Association of Civil Engineers in 2004. A similar dam was constructed in Kaizu-shi by De Rijke in 1891, and together the structures are named locally as Oranda Sekihisage (the Dutch dams).

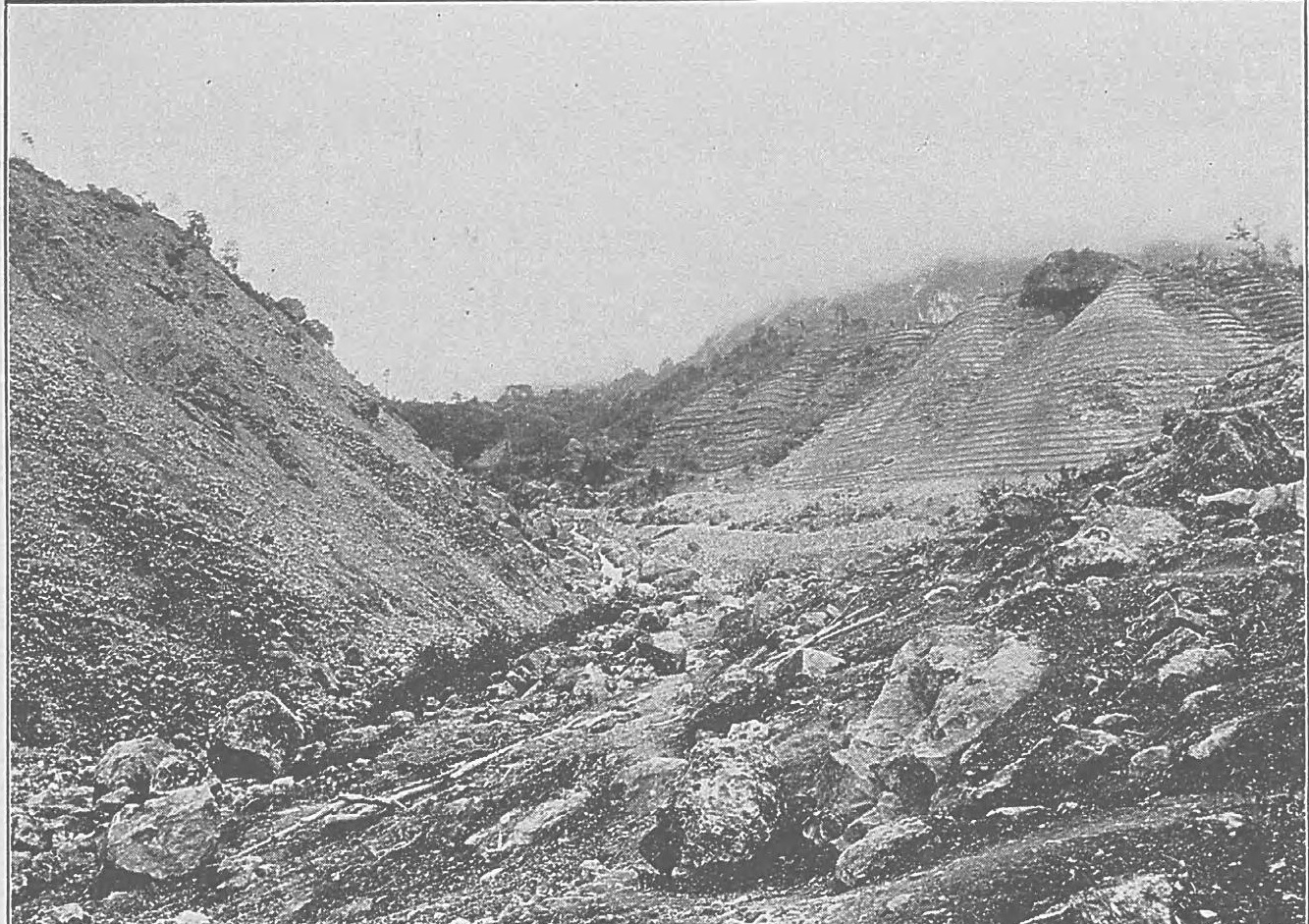
The Joganji River in 1909

==== Development of the Port of Osaka ====
De Rijke and Cornelius van Doorn initially proposed a plan for improvements to the Port of Osaka in 1875, but it was rejected by the Port authorities due to cost. In 1890 industrial and commercial pressure on the governor of Osaka, Nishimura Sutezō, led to his request for de Rijke to formulate a revised plan. De Rijke's proposal was for the redirection of the Yodo River away from the port to mitigate silt accumulation and enhance navigability. This plan, devised in 1890, also aimed to address flood risk.

The plan remained unimplemented until 1892, when de Rijke was commissioned to advance the works. His initial works involved surveying and geotechnical investigations which revealed the presence of extremely soft ground conditions. De Rijke's design approach drew inspiration from the IJmuiden sea lock in the Netherlands and the Port of Tanjung Priok in the Dutch East Indies. The project was hampered by significant disagreements between de Rijke and Japanese officials, and in 1897 an overall plan for the works incorporating several elements of de Rijke's original proposal, along with modifications by local engineers, was approved. The role of construction director was assigned to Okino Tadao, a Japanese engineer with French training, and not de Rijke.

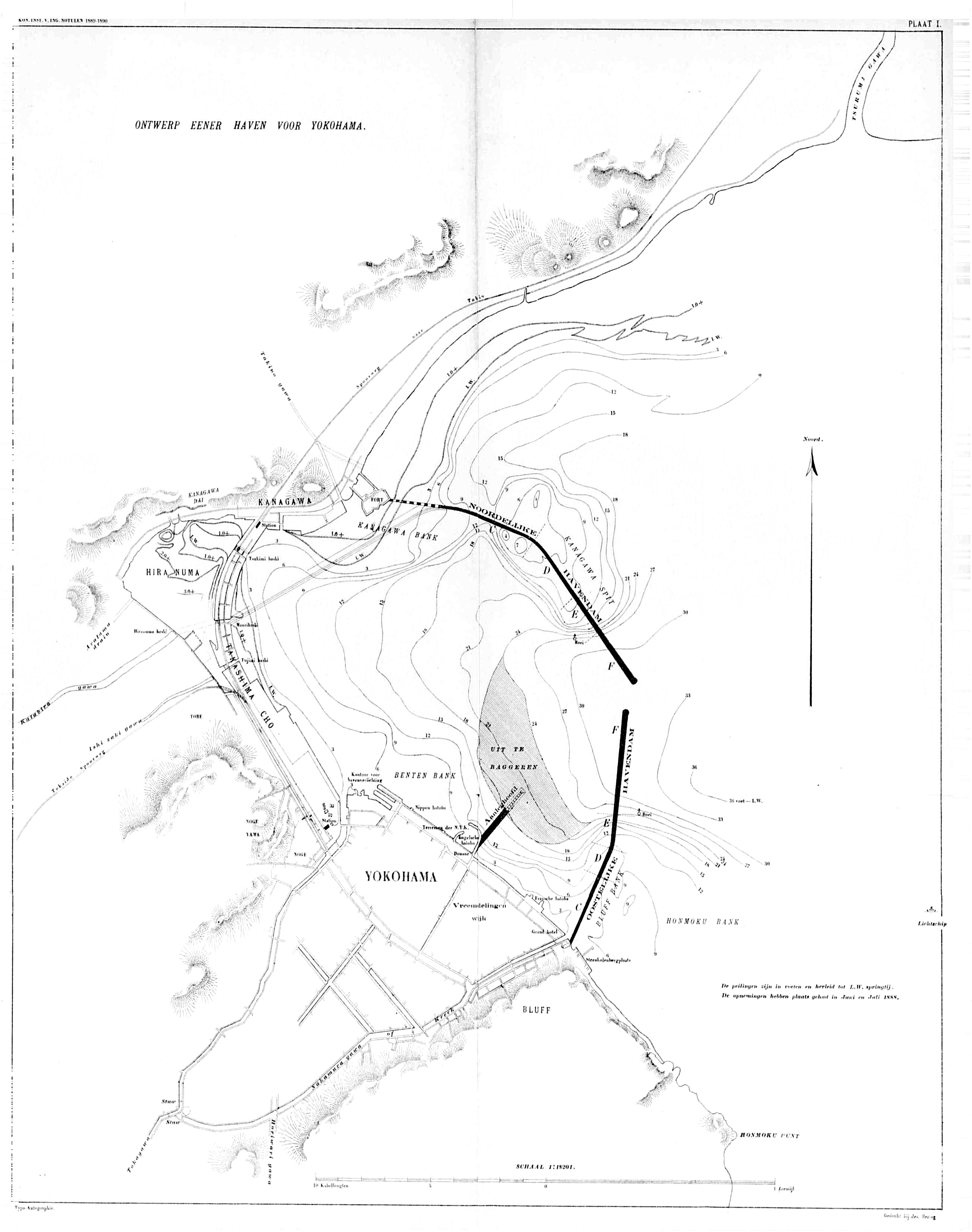
Harbour plan for Yokohama

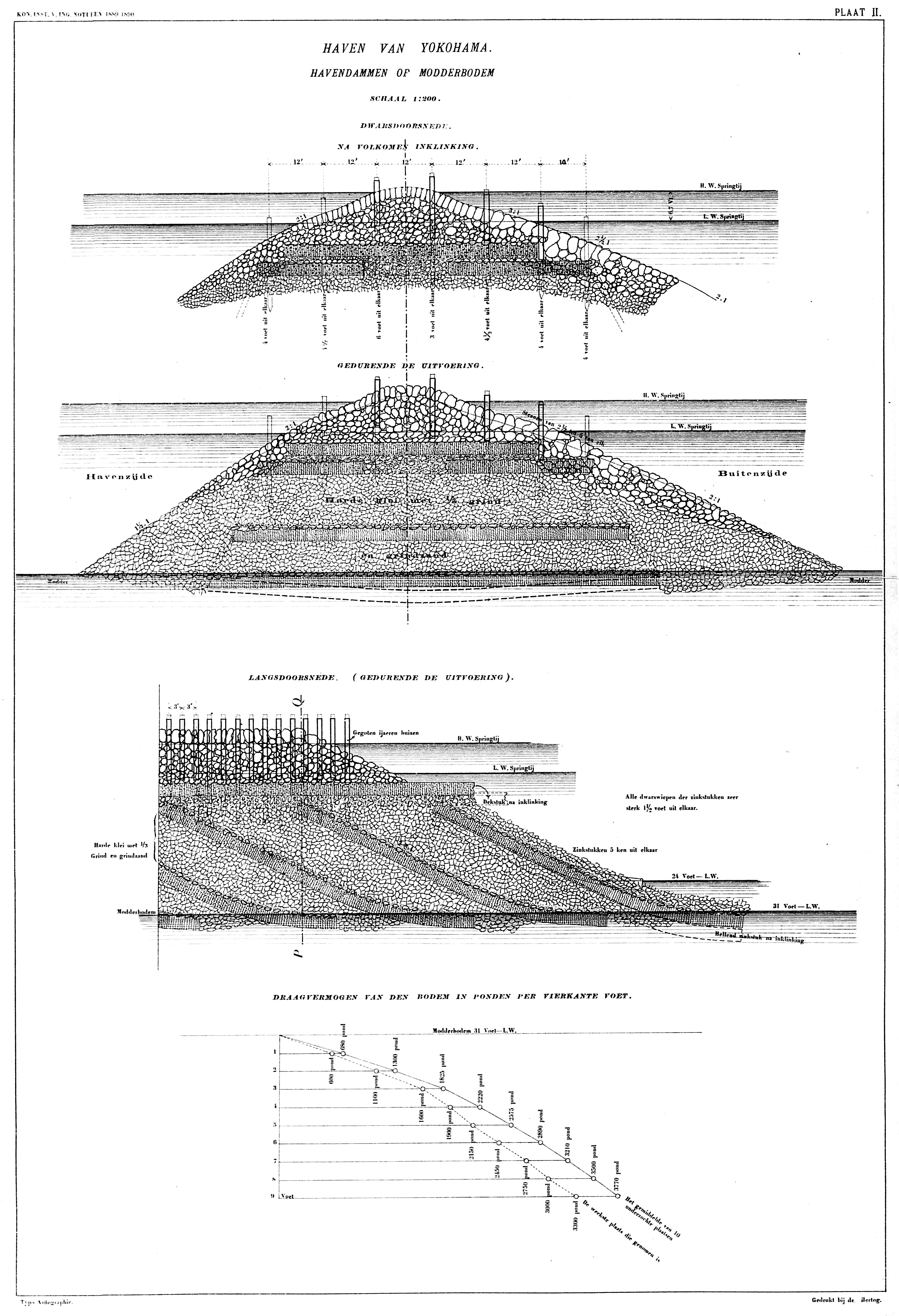
Cross section showing de Rijke's design for a breakwater at the Port of Yokohama

==== The Port of Yokohama ====
In addition to their works on the Tone River, de Rijke and Rouwenhorst Mulder collaborated on plans for improvements to the Port of Yokohama between 1886 and 1889, during which time the port authorities received an alternative proposal from the British Indian engineer Henry Spencer Palmer. The port's redevelopment was funded in part by reparations from the United States following the Shimonoseki campaign. The plans were similar in overall layout, but differed fundamentally in the construction methods and layout of the breakwaters.

Despite expert recommendations favouring de Rijke's design, diplomatic pressures led to the adoption of Palmer's proposal in 1889. The works were beset by extensive delays which were attributed primarily to the substandard quality of concrete used in construction, and the works were not completed until 1896.

Spencer's proposal received backing through British diplomatic channels, whereas de Rijke and Rouwenhorst Mulder's received negligible support from the Netherlands government. The fundamental difference between the two designs lay in the construction of the foundations for the breakwaters, with de Rijke opting for fascine mattresses, a decision informed by the soft soils of the port's seabed. In contrast, Palmer's design relied on extensive use of concrete and was found to be problematic in such soft ground conditions.

The decision to proceed with Palmer's design led to significant Japanese media coverage and protracted written correspondence, along with allegations of corruption being made against several officials.

==== Joganji River Flood Protection ====
De Rijke undertook works from 1891 at the Joganji River in Fukuyama-ken, in order to improve the river’s storage capacity and mitigate flooding during excessive rainfall. The need for the works had been highlighted by a dike breach at Ansei, which had resulted in the inundation of over 1,500 hectares of land. In response to this event, de Rijke was commissioned to devise a comprehensive flood protection strategy for the region.

His proposal involved measures such as the construction of twelve bank defences to safeguard agricultural zones, the establishment of a double dike system, downstream river regulation, and the enhancement of the river's storage capacity by widening the riverbed.

A contemporaneous photograph bears the caption: "Johannes de Rijke, an engineer employed by the Ministry of the Interior, who suffered the results of it flooding in 1899, once described it as 'not a river, but a waterfall.' The plan involves an investment of a substantial 10,000 yen for the river's renovation, initiating erosion control work on the upstream Yukawa River from 1901, projected over a 20-year period.” De Rijke characterised the Joganji River as more akin to rapids than a conventional river.

The project commenced in 1903, shortly before de Rijke returned to the Netherlands. He made this return journey by train, taking the Trans-Siberian Railway, and wrote a book about the journey. The Joganji project continued after de Rijke's departure, and was completed in 1926.

Front cover of de Rijke's 1904 book detailing his journey from Japan to the Netherlands by train, which he made in 1903

==== Other Projects in Japan ====
De Rijke's involvement in other Japanese projects included:

- Chikugo: River improvement works.
- Hiroshima: Development of a port plan.
- Katsura: River improvement and management.
- Kobe: Design of jetties for maritime infrastructure.
- Kuzuryu: River improvement to enhance flow and water management.
- Nagasaki: Strategic port plan.
- Niigata: Harbour construction and development.
- Sakai: Port development plan.
- Shinano: River improvement for water resource management.
- Tokyo: Port planning, improvements in sewerage and water supply systems.
- Yokkaichi, Yoshino: River improvements, environmental restoration and flood control.
- Yandani erosion control dam, Nakatsugawa: Erosion control structure.

=== China ===
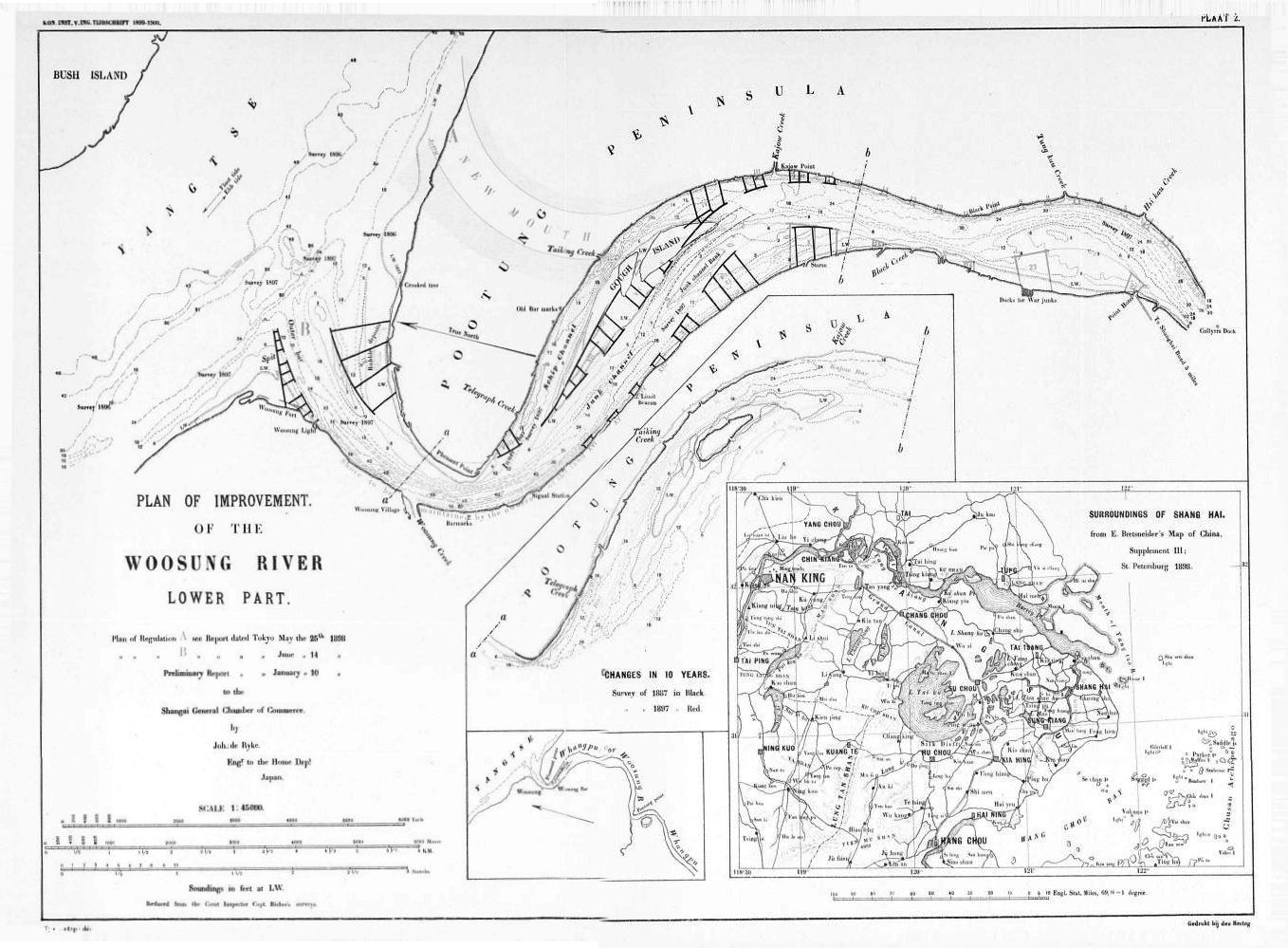
Plan of the improvements of the Woosung River in China

De Rijke was involved in engineering works in China from 1873. In correspondence with the Dutch consul in Shanghai, E. van Heukelsveldt Slaghek, he discussed works at the Wusong Inner Bar, a sandbank on the Wusong (or Woosung) River (Chinese: 吴淞江) at the mouth of the Huangpu Jiang, approximately 9 miles from Shanghai. As a tributary of the Yangtze, the river played a crucial role in Shanghai's international trade. Silting of the river was extensively reported by the North-China Herald and other local press in the 1870s as causing major problems for shipping, which led to tensions between Shanghai's mercantile community and the city administration, as well as Chinese and international diplomatic authorities.

These events took place during efforts by the Qing dynasty to strengthen and westernise China which became known as the Self-Strengthening Movement, a situation similar to the one de Rijke was familiar with from his experience of the Meiji Restoration in Japan. However, circumstances in China were complicated by the political and economic landscape of the Shanghai International Settlement and Treaty ports system, in which designated Chinese cities were opened to foreign trade and residence. A group of shipping companies and their underwriters, as well as businessmen in the United Kingdom who also acted as honorary consuls in Shanghai, advocated for dredging to solve the Wusong Bar issues. In order to advance their case, this group commissioned a report from de Rijke and George Arnold Escher. Despite reluctance from de Rijke's Japanese employers, he travelled to China and undertook a survey of the river in 1875 with Escher, and their subsequent report proposed dredging and other hydraulic engineering measures. However, no works were implemented at that time due to disagreements on the requirements, the absence of consensus on funding and ownership, and political disagreements between the Chinese administration and the consular authorities of Britain and the U.S. in Beijing.

Whilst the shipping companies pressed for action to address the ongoing navigation issues caused by the sandbar, Chinese officials were reluctant to approve the scheme, seeing it as a potential infringement on China’s sovereignty over its internal waterways. They also objected to bearing construction and maintenance costs arising from major civil engineering works that would mainly benefit foreign shipping interests. After the Yellow River flood of 1887, the Government of the Netherlands under Jan Heemskerk financed a mission to investigate commercial opportunities for Dutch companies associated with flood defence and hydraulic engineering in China, however no projects arose directly from the work of this mission.

The reluctance of the Chinese authorities to dredge the bar was a factor leading to the construction by British and other foreign interests of the Shanghai - Wusong railroad. Although large sections of the railway had been built without Chinese consent, it was nearing completion by November 1876, and an agreement was reached whereby the Chinese Government would purchase the railroad, with the foreign interests permitted to complete its construction and operate it for a year. Construction was completed in 1877, but with a ban on goods traffic, the revenues from passengers alone more than covered operating costs and therefore the problems of goods shipment caused by the sandbank remained. The railroad came under Chinese ownership in November 1877, whereupon it was immediately demolished and the rolling stock sent to Taiwan on the instruction of Shen Baozhen.

Despite the ongoing impasse over the Wusong project, de Rijke remained active in China, and in 1896 he received a commission from the Shanghai Chamber of Commerce, becoming involved in flood control works at the Yellow River.

In 1905, works at Huangpu Jiang were finally commenced, and de Rijke was appointed to spearhead the project by the Chinese Government, assuming the role of chief engineer of the Whangpoo Conservancy Board, working for the contractor Nederlandsche Maatschappij voor Havenwerken (English: Dutch Company for Harbour Works). He arrived in Shanghai in February 1906 with his 16-year-old son Hendrik and daughter Jacoba. His work included a new jetty at Wusong and the creation of a river channel at Gaoqiao. The works improved navigation by increasing low water depth at the river mouth from 15 ft to 21 ft, and in the new Gaoqiao channel from 2–3 ft to 19 ft.

De Rijke supervised a primarily Dutch staff of approximately 80 employees and used two bucket ladder dredgers (the Rhenania and the Colonia, shipped from Emden in 1906) along with a suction dredger (the Cyclop), with the dredging work undertaken by the East Asiatic Dredging Company. His plans culminated in the complete clearance of the Woosung bar. He resigned in November 1910, before the completion of the project, and returned to the Netherlands. The project continued under the leadership of Swedish engineer H.M. von Heidenstam and was completed in 1928.

De Rijke's son Hendrik, who worked in Nantong in 1916 to implement his father's plans for the Yangtze River, died in 1919 at the age of 29 during a cholera epidemic.

== Later life and legacy ==
De Rijke was awarded the Order of the Sacred Treasures, 2nd class, by the Japanese Government. He was appointed as an Officer of the Order of Orange-Nassau, and on 13 January 1911, he was knighted in the Order of the Dutch Lion. He was knighted by the Government of Belgium in the Order of Leopold.

De Rijke died in Amsterdam in 1913 at the age of 70, and is buried in the Zorgvlied cemetery. An annual visit by a Japanese delegation takes place at his graveside, involving the laying of a wreath and the performance of a Buddhist ceremony. The Dutch organisation, Stichting Blauwe Lijn (English: Blue Line Foundation) organised a theme year and a series of events around de Rijke's life and work in 2024.

He is commemorated in the naming of a split hopper barge operated by the Dutch dredging company Van Oord. Today, Dutch words such as peil (English: water level), and krib (pronounced “kereppu” in Japanese), meaning groyne, are common technical terms in Japanese.

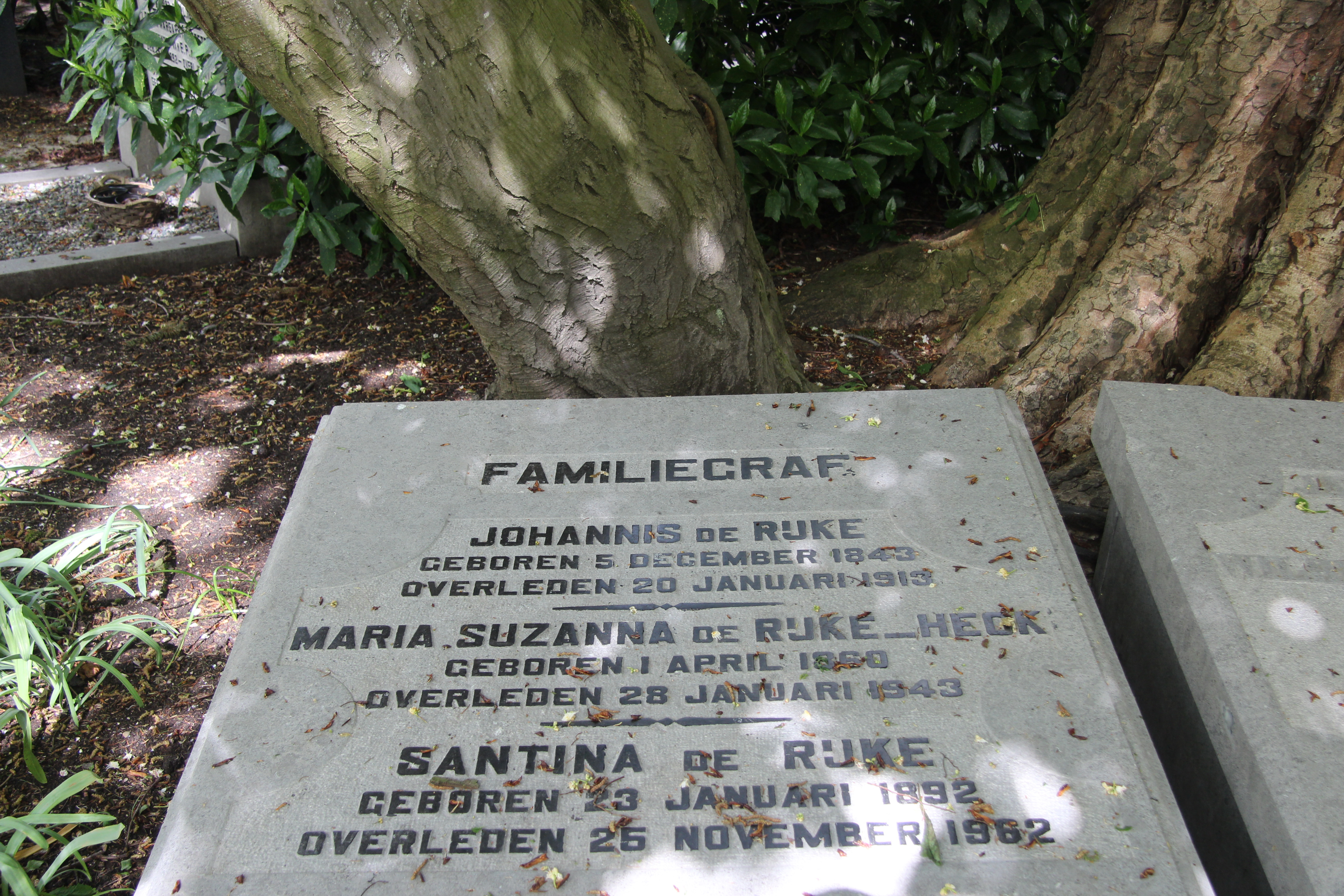
Grave of Johannis de Rijke - The stone incorrectly mentions the birthdate as 1843; it should be 1842

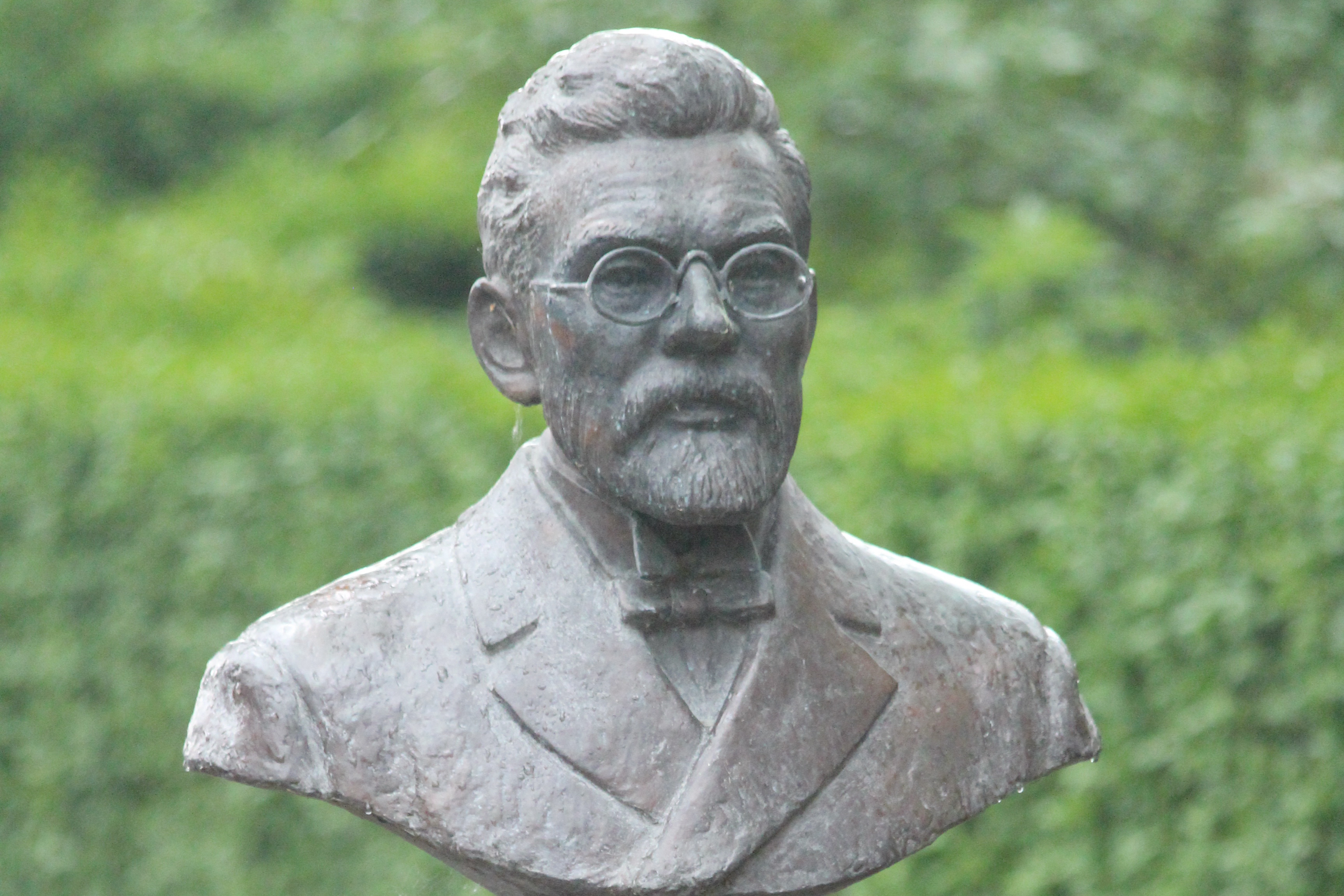
Bust of Johannis de Rijke in Colijnsplaat

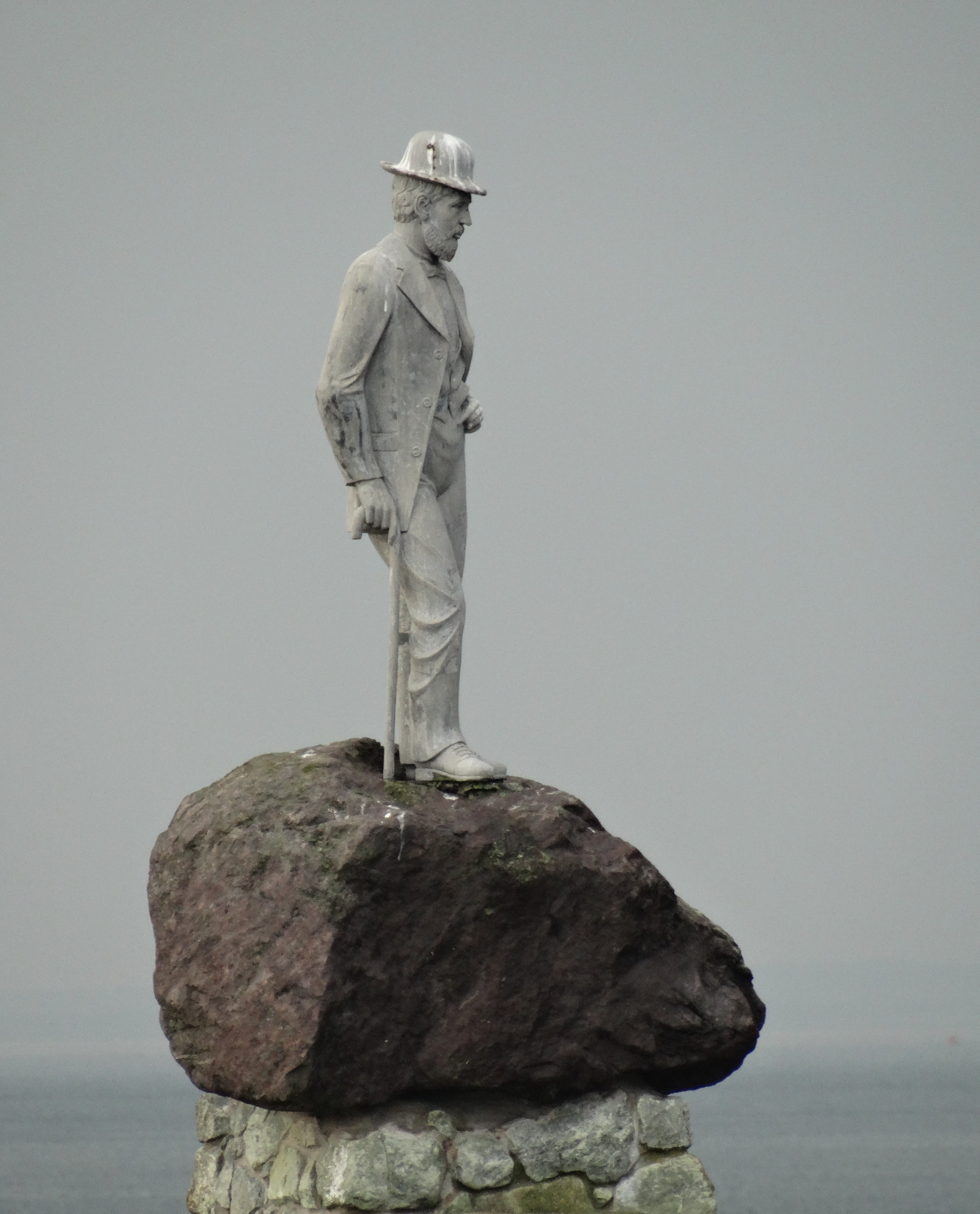
Statue Johannis de Rijke in Colijnsplaat

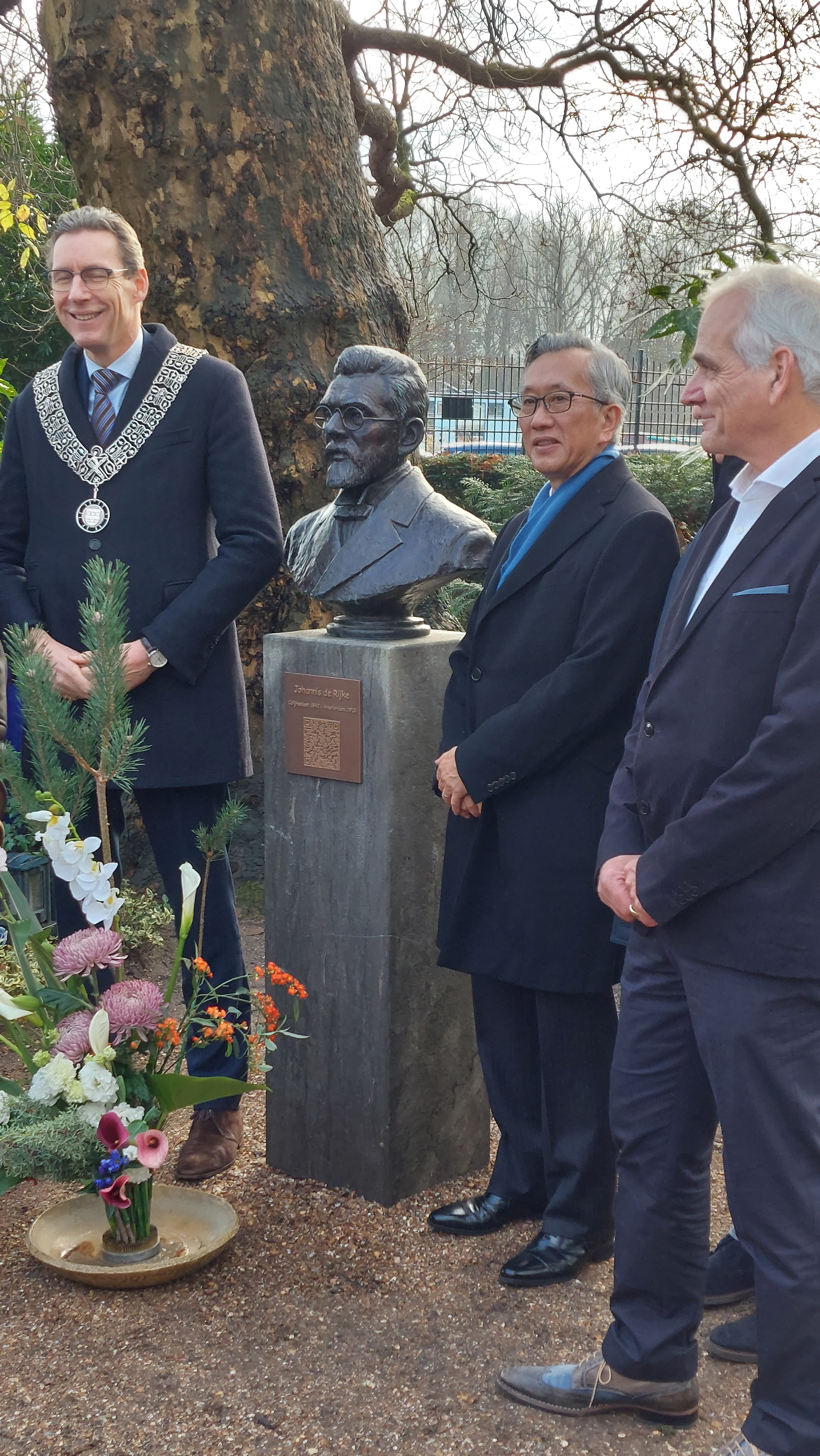
Bust of Johannis de Rijke at Zorglied during inauguration in 2023

== Honours ==
- Order of the Sacred Treasures, 1889 (4th class); 1892 (3rd class); 1903 (2nd class)
- Order of Orange-Nassau, 1911
- Order of the Dutch Lion, 1913
- Order of Leopold (Belgium)
