= Ishii lock =

Lock on the canal beside the Kitakami River in Japan

Coordinates: 38°26′48″N 141°17′28″E

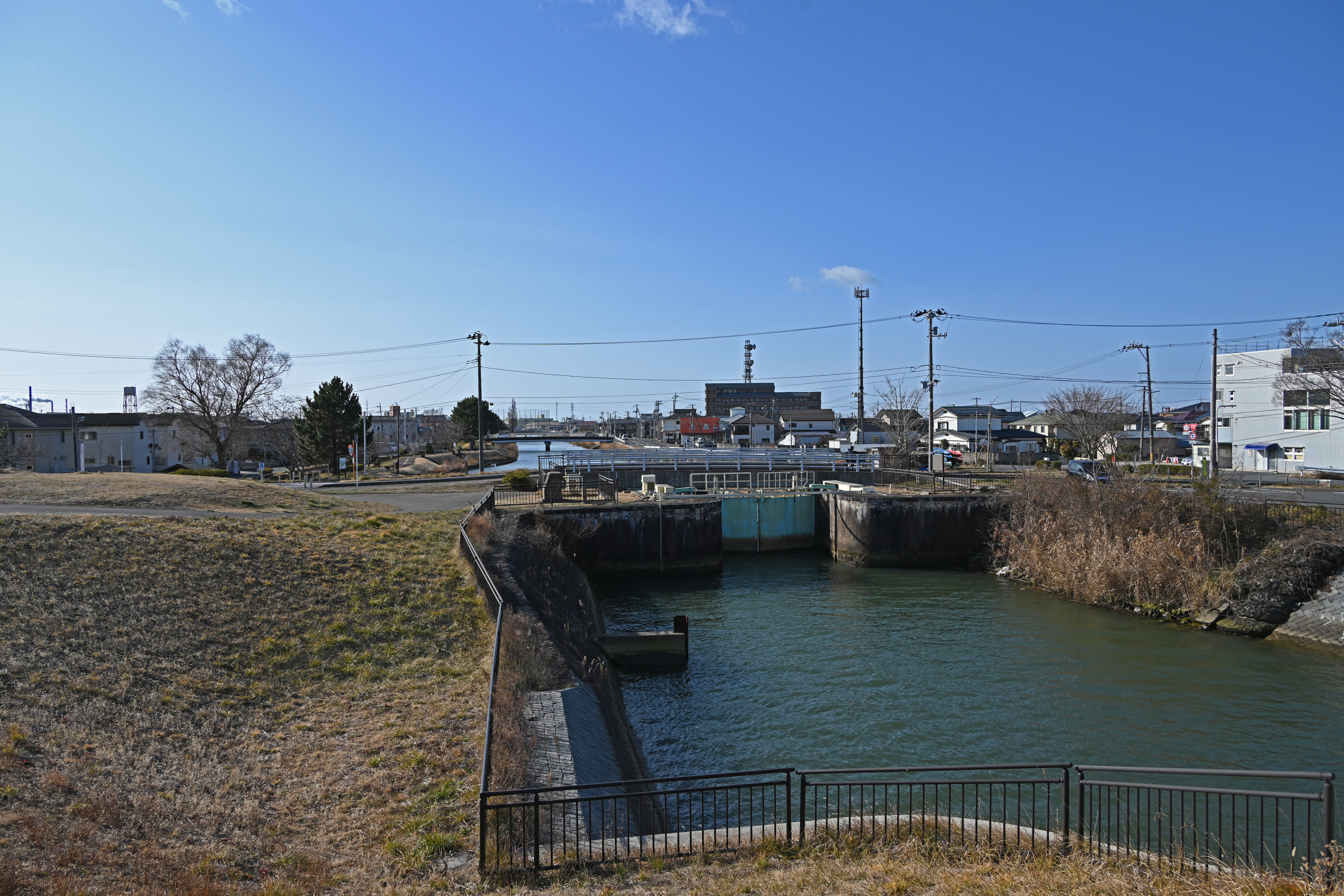
The Ishii lock seen from the northeast

The Ishii lock (石井閘門), begun in 1878 and completed in 1880, is a lock on the canal beside the Kitakami River in Ishinomaki, Miyagi Prefecture, Japan. Designed by Dutch engineer Cornelis Johannes van Doorn, who was a foreign advisor to the Meiji government, it is the earliest example of such a facility in Japan.

The lock measures 50.6 meters in length and 8.6 meters in width, and took an estimated 500,000 red bricks and 2000 labourers to complete. The original gate was made of wood, but was replaced by a 5.9-meter-high (19 ft) steel gate in 1966.

In 2002, it was designated as an Important Cultural Property of Japan.

== See also ==
- Tatsuta polder sluice gates
- Foreign government advisors in Meiji Japan
- Mechanical Engineering Heritage (Japan)
- Important Cultural Properties of Japan
- Rangaku
