= Port of Hachinohe =

Hachinohe
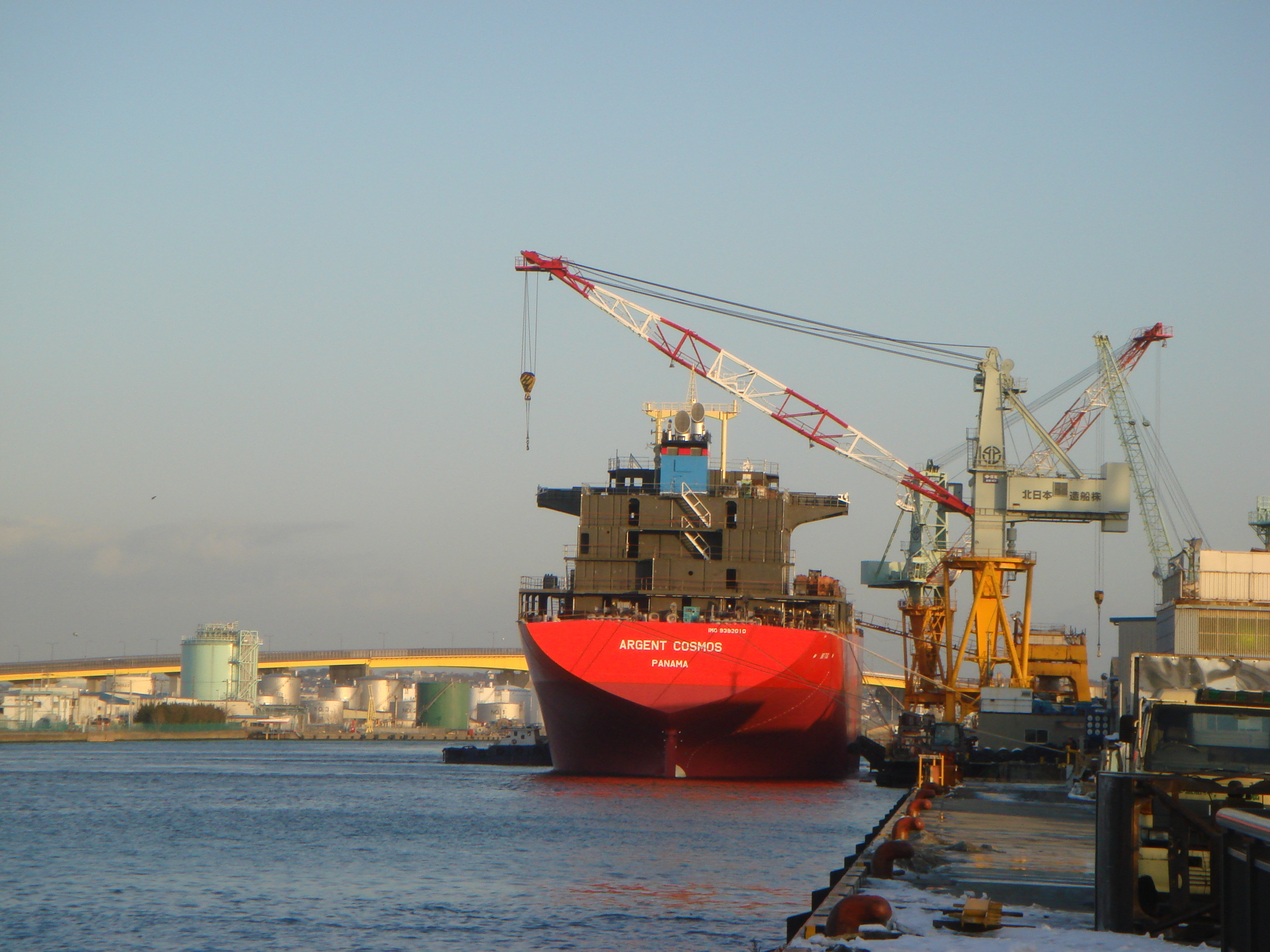
- Interactive map of Hachinohe
- Location within Japan Location within Aomori Prefecture

Location
- Country: Japan
- Location: 1-131 Kitanuma Kawaragi, Hachinohe, Aomori 039-1161
- Coordinates: 40°32′34″N 141°31′55″E

Details
- Opened: 1929
- Operated by: Hachinohe Port Authority
- Type of Harbor: Seaport
- Land area: 619 hectares
- No. of berths: 48

The Port of Hachinohe (八戸港, Hachinohe-kō) is a seaport on the Pacific coast of Aomori Prefecture, in the city of Hachinohe in the Tōhoku region of northern Honshū, Japan. It is classified as a Specially-Authorized Port (特定港, Tokutei-kō) by the Japanese government as an official port of entry into Japan with associated immigration and customs facilities. The port is divided into five sectors, with a total land area of 619 hectares.

== History ==
Hachinohe developed as a castle town of the Nanbu clan’s Hachinohe Domain in the Edo period. The port was a major fishing port, and a port of call for the coastal trade from Osaka and Edo to Hokkaidō.

In modern times, the area was earmarked for economic development by the Meiji government, which hired Dutch oyatoi gaikokujin civil engineer Anthonie Rouwenhorst Mulder (1848–1901) to redesign and rebuilt the port facilities along western lines. Immigration facilities were established in 1925, and the port was officially opened for foreign trade by the Home Ministry in 1928. It was designated a primary seaport by the Japanese government in 1954.

The port facilities suffered minor damage from a tsunami caused by the 1960 Valdivia earthquake off Chile and again in 1968 from the Tokachi-oki earthquake. The port facilities were continually expanded from the 1970s through the 1990s, with additional berths and the construction of a port island. Regularly scheduled container services to Southeast Asia began in 1994, to Korea and the United States in 1998, and to China in 1999. In 2001, the Hattaro Refrigerated Warehouse was completed, furnishing the Port of Hachinohe with a temperature control and humidification system for storage of agricultural products.

In March 2011, the port facilities were severely damaged by a tsunami from the 2011 Tōhoku earthquake.

== Shipping ==
Hachinohe Port Authority administers the Port of Hachinohe and its 48 berths for both domestic and international container services. Domestic routes include Tokyo and Yokohama, and overseas routes include Taiwan, Singapore, Korea, Australia, South America, Europe, Canada, and the United States.

The port has seven fuel terminals with capacity to store over 11 million barrels of oil, and supplies fuel for the local fishing fleet as well as nearby Misawa Air Base operated by the United States Air Force.

== Fishing Port ==
Hachinohe is a major fishing port, with 142,000 tons of seafood products landed in 2004, the fourth largest volume in Japan. In the year 2002, Hachinohe was first in Japan in terms of squid, Olive flounder

== Passenger Terminal ==
Hachinohe Port is connected with regular ferry services to Tomakomai, Hokkaidō.
