= Berend George Escher =

Dutch geologist (1885–1967)

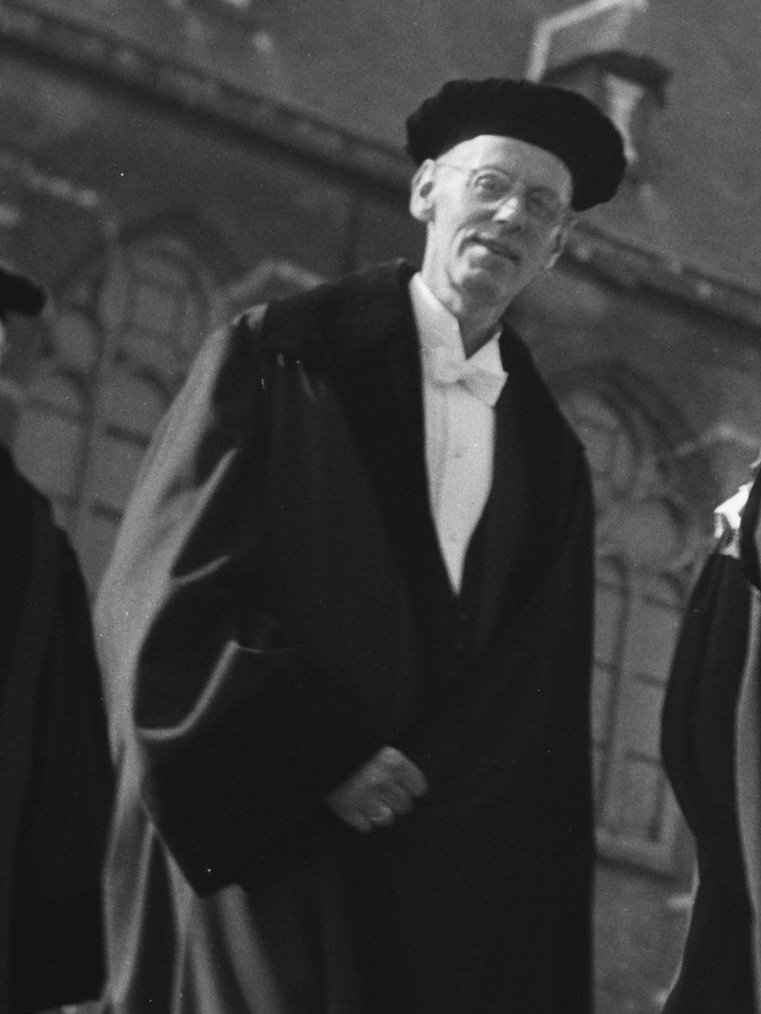
- Escher (1945)
- Born: 4 April 1885; Gorinchem, Netherlands
- Died: 11 October 1967 (aged 82); Arnhem, Netherlands
- Education: Eidgenössische Technische Hochschule, Zürich
- Father: George Arnold Escher
- Relatives: M. C. Escher, half-brother
- Scientific career
- Fields: Geology, Volcanology
- Workplaces: University of Amsterdam (1911–); Delft University; Royal Dutch Shell (1916–); Leiden University (1922–1955)
- Doctoral advisor: Albert Heim

Berend George Escher (4 April 1885 – 11 October 1967) was a Dutch geologist.

Escher had a broad interest, but his research was mainly on crystallography, mineralogy and volcanology. He was a pioneer in experimental geology. He was a half-brother of the artist M. C. Escher, and had some influence on his work due to his knowledge of crystallography. M.C. Escher created a woodcut ex libris for his brother 'Beer' with a stylized image of a volcano around 1922 (Bool number 91).

Escher was the son of the civil engineer G. A. Escher, a director of the Dutch watermanagement (Rijkswaterstaat) and his first wife, Charlotte Marie Hartitzsch. Escher spent his youth in Switzerland. He studied geology at the Eidgenössische Technische Hochschule (Technical University) of Zürich, where he was a pupil of Albert Heim. He finished his studies in 1911 and returned to the Netherlands where he first became the assistant of M. E. F. T. Dubois at the University of Amsterdam and then curator of the geological collections at Delft University. In 1916 he was employed by Royal Dutch Shell in the Dutch East Indies.

Escher became professor at Leiden University in 1922, at the same time he became director of the geological museum there, he was the successor of K. Martin in that position. Whereas Martin's interest lay mainly with paleontology and stratigraphy, Escher was in the first place a mineralogist. In Leiden he reorganized the museum by giving more attention to educating the general public in geology. He wrote books on geology, mineralogy and crystallography, scientific as well as for the general public.

His research area was mainly volcanology. He was also interested in the geology of the Moon. Of importance were his contributions in discussions with F. A. Vening Meinesz, Ph. H. Kuenen and J. H. F. Umbgrove on zones of negative gravitational anomalies, which they explained by assuming that convection took place in the mantle. Escher's contribution was to research volcanism at these zones. He was also a pioneer in using experiments to solve geological questions, for which he set up a laboratory in Leiden.

During the German occupation of the Netherlands in World War II, Escher was kept captive by the Nazis for some time. After his release he went in hiding until the liberation in 1945.

When Leiden University reopened he became rector magnificus. He retired in 1955. He was elected IAV President (IAV at that time) for two periods (1948–1954).
