= George Arnold Escher =

Dutch civil engineer and foreign advisor

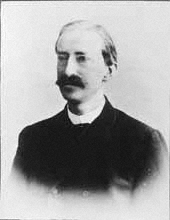
- Born: 10 May 1843; Den Haag, Netherlands
- Died: 14 June 1939 (aged 96); Den Haag, Netherlands
- Occupation: Civil engineer
- Spouses: Charlotte Marie Hartitzsch (m. 1882; died 1885) Sara Gleichman (m. 1892)
- Children: 5 sons, including: M. C. Escher; Berend George Escher

George Arnold Escher (10 May 1843 – 14 June 1939) was a Dutch civil engineer and a foreign advisor to the Japanese government during the Meiji period.

He was the father of the graphic artist M. C. Escher and the geologist Berend George Escher.

== Career ==
Escher was hired by the Japanese government as a foreign advisor from September 1873 to July 1878, along with fellow Dutch civil engineers Johannis de Rijke and Cornelis Johannes van Doorn. During his stay in Japan, he designed and supervised the restoration of the Yodo river (Osaka), and built a harbour in Mikuni in Fukui prefecture.

Escher also collaborated on works in China with Johannis de Rijke, including works related to the sandbank at the mouth of the Huangpu Jiang. This tributary of the Yangtze River plays a crucial role in Shanghai's international trade. Escher accompanied de Rijke on an exploratory visit to Shanghai and compiled a report that garnered considerable attention, though it did not culminate in immediate implementation.

After returning to the Netherlands, he worked in Maastricht. During this time, he recorded in his diary his difficulty as a Protestant in finding a suitable marriage partner in Roman Catholic Maastricht who would also be able to satisfy his equation v = 1/2m + 10, where v was the age of the woman, and m the age of the husband. In 1882, Escher married Charlotte Marie Hartitzsch, with whom he had two sons. She died in 1885, and in 1892 Escher married Sara Gleichman, with whom he had three more sons. Escher worked as a hydraulic engineer in Leeuwarden. In 1903 the family moved to Arnhem.
