= Cornelis Johannes van Doorn =

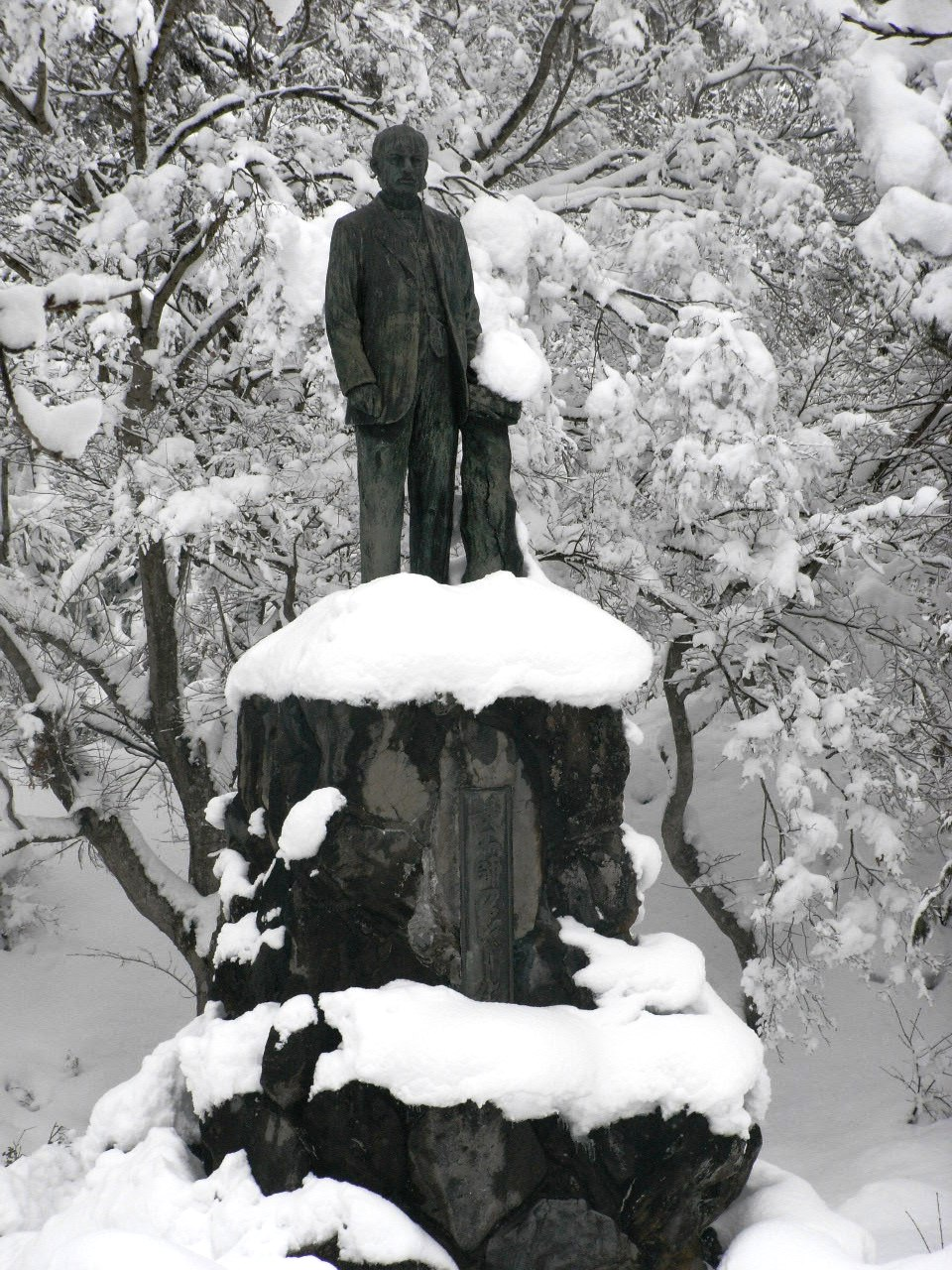
- Statue of Cornelis Johannes van Doorn by the Asaka Canal, Japan
- Born: 5 January 1837; Brummen, Netherlands
- Died: 24 February 1906 (aged 69); Amsterdam, Netherlands
- Occupation: civil engineer

Cornelis Johannes van Doorn (コルネリス・ヨハネス・ファン・ドールン; 5 January 1837 – 24 February 1906) was a Dutch civil engineer and foreign advisor to Meiji period Japan.

== Biography ==
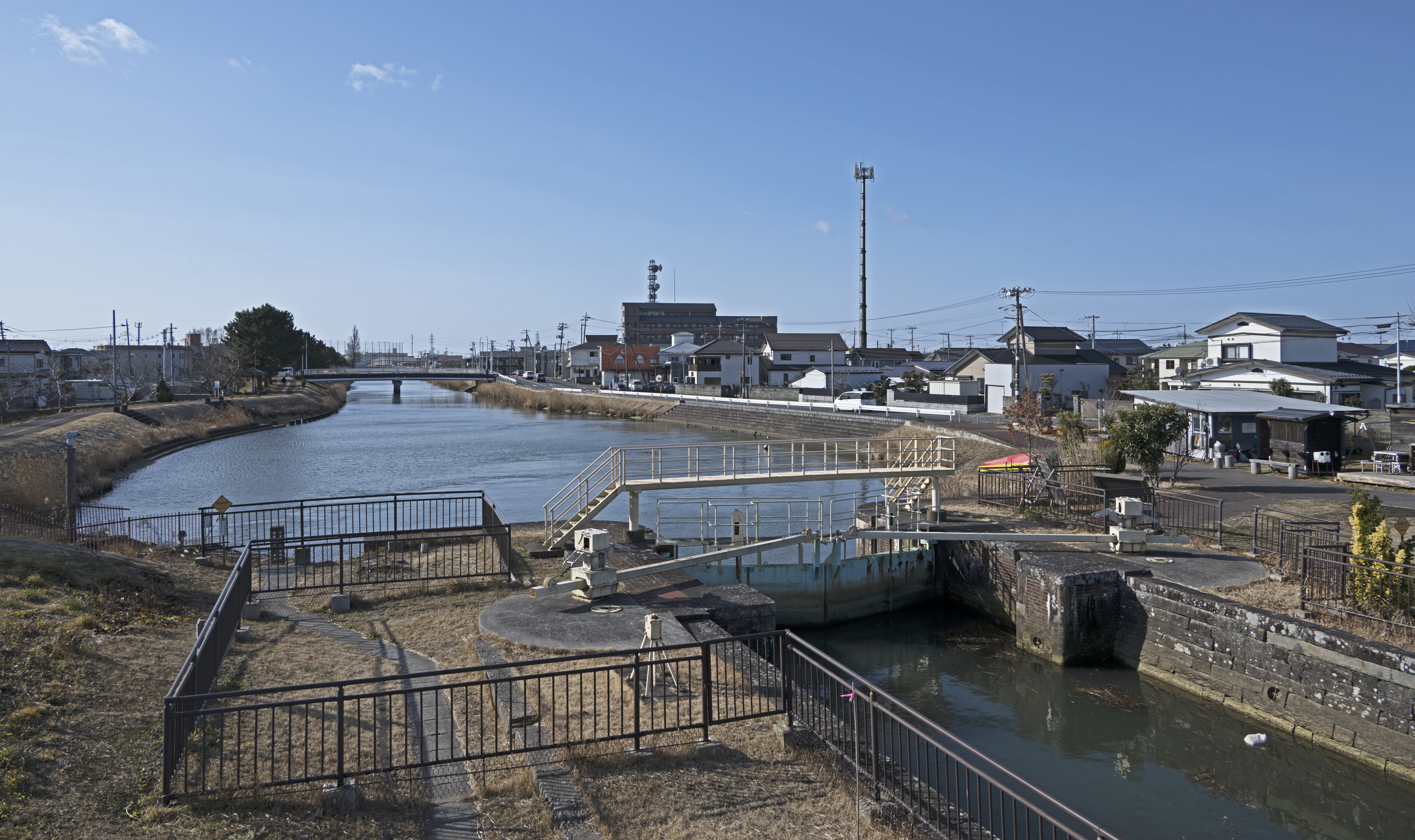
The Ishii lock

Cornelis Johannes van Doorn was born on 5 January 1837 in Hall (Gelderland), Netherlands, the son of the Reverend PW van Doorn. Van Doorn studied at the Technical School of Dr. Grothe in Utrecht and then at the Royal Academy in Delft. He received his degree in 1860 as a civil engineer. In his early career, he went to Java in the Dutch East Indies, returning home in 1863 to work for the Maatschappij tot Exploitatie van Staatsspoorwegen railway company in North Holland. From March 1865 he worked as an engineer in designing the locks, pumping station and dam on the IJ (Amsterdam).

In 1871 Van Doorn was invited by the Japanese government to act as an expert in hydraulic engineering, arriving in Japan on 24 March 1872, and staying to 22 July 1880. During his time in Japan, he was involved in port development and river improvement projects on the Edo River, Osaka, Yokohama, and Nobiru in Sendai Bay. He designed Japan's first western-style waterway, the Asaka Canal, which reclaimed land for 52 kilometers around Lake Inawashiro in Fukushima Prefecture and made the development of the city of Kōriyama possible. A memorial bronze statue was erected to him beside the sluice gate on the Tone River in 1931. He also designed Japan's first western-style lock, the Ishii lock in Ishinomaki, designated an Important Cultural Property in 2002.

Returning to the Netherlands after eight years, Van Doorn died in Amsterdam in 1906.

In the Netherlands, not much is known about his efforts in Japan. In Japan, on the other hand his name is found in schoolbooks, there are museums dedicated to him and streets and squares named after them. Even Van Doorn's grave in Amsterdam is maintained at the expense of the Japanese city of Kōriyama.

== See also ==
- Johannis de Rijke
- Foreign government advisors in Meiji Japan
