= Port of Tokyo =

Coordinates: 35°37′01″N 139°47′44″E

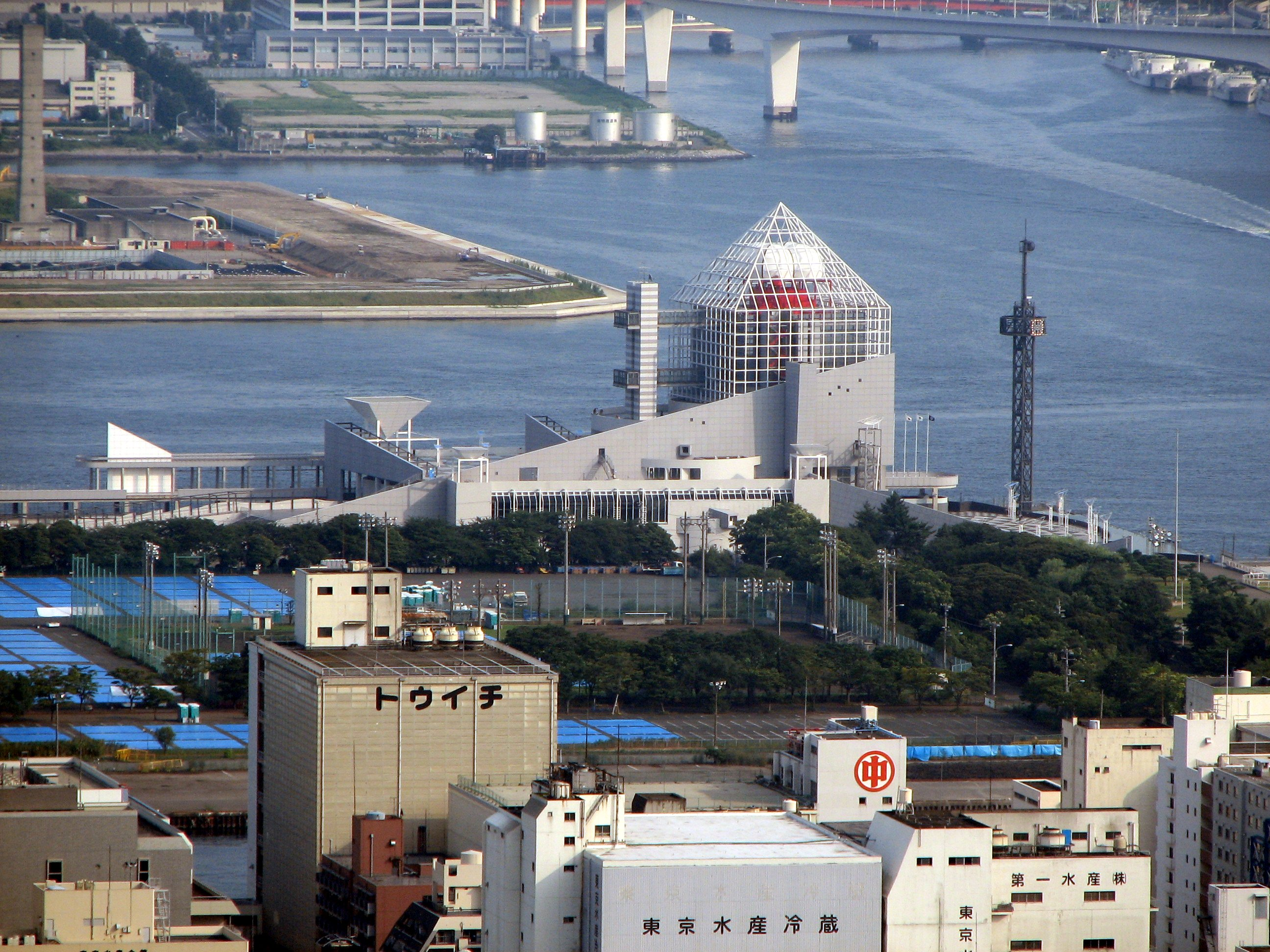
- Harumi passenger terminal
- Interactive map of Port of Tokyo

Location
- Country: Japan
- Location: Tokyo

Details
- Owned by: Tokyo Port Authority
- Type of Harbor: Natural/Artificial
- Size of harbour: 5,292 ha (52.92 sq km)
- Land area: 1,033 ha (10.33 sq km)
- Size: 6,325 ha (63.25 sq km)
- No. of berths: 205
- Employees: 30,000 (2007)

Statistics
- Vessel arrivals: 31,653 vessels (2008)
- Annual cargo tonnage: 90,810,000 tonnes (2007)
- Annual container volume: 3,696,000 Twenty-foot equivalent units (2007)
- Value of cargo: ¥12,012.9 billion (2006)
- Website kouwan.metro.tokyo.jp/en

The Port of Tokyo is one of the largest Japanese seaports and one of the largest seaports in the Pacific Ocean basin having an annual traffic capacity of around 100 million tonnes of cargo and 4,500,000 twenty-foot equivalent units.

The port is also an important employer in the area having more than 30,000 employees that provide services to more than 32,000 ships every year.

== History ==
The forerunner of the Port of Tokyo, the Edo Port (Edo Minato) played a very important role in the history of marine transport of Japan and as a distribution point for supplying goods for the people of Edo. During the Tokugawa Shogunate the Port of Tokyo was not allowed to open to international trade, although the neighbouring Port of Yokohama was already open for this kind of trade.

The development of the port was finally encouraged during the Meiji Period with the influence of a project that was meant to improve the estuary of the Sumida River by dredging channels and reclaiming land at Tsukishima and Shibaura.

The Kanto earthquake in 1923 served as a starting point of a full-scale terminal construction project, which was topped out with the opening of the first terminal, Hinode, in 1925. Alongside the completion of another two terminals, Shibaura and Takeshiba, the Port of Tokyo opened for international trade on May 20, 1941.

After World War II the development of the port became a vital task for the reconstruction of the Japanese industry, and construction started on the Toyosu coal terminal, the Harumi terminal and other terminals one after another.

By the late 1960s, the container transport system had become a major factor in shipping worldwide. In 1967, Nippon Container Terminals, Ltd. (NCT), became the port's (and Japan's) first container terminal operator. That same year, the first container ship to call on a Japanese port was the first such ship handled by NCT. This significantly contributed to establishing the Port of Tokyo as a major international trade port.

== Statistics ==
In 2007 the Port of Tokyo handled 90,810,000 tonnes of cargo and 3,696,000 twenty-foot equivalent units, making it one of the busiest cargo ports in Japan and one of the largest container ports in the country.

General statistics between 2004 - 2006
Year	2004	2005	2006
Vessels (number)	32,633	32,180	31,653
Foreign trade (trillion ¥)	9.9	10.8	12
Containers (twenty-foot equivalents)	3,358,000	3,598,000	3,696,000
Containers^{*}	42,972,000	43,281,000	42,987,000
Other cargo^{*}	48,455,000	48,751,000	47,824,000
Total^{*}'	91,427,000	92,032,000	90,811,000

* figures in tonnes

== Terminals ==
=== Container terminals ===
The Port of Tokyo has three container terminals with an area of 1,504,718 m^{2} with a total number of 15 berths and a quay length of 4,479 metres.

==== Oi container terminal ====
The terminal has seven berths with an area of 945,700 m^{2} and a quay length of 2,354 metres.

==== Aomi container terminal ====
The terminal has five berths with an area of 479,079 m^{2} and a quay length of 1,570 metres.

==== Shinagawa container terminal ====
The terminal has three berths with an area of 79,939 m^{2} and a quay length of 333 metres. Opened in 1967 it is the oldest container terminal in Japan.

==== Kamigumi Tokyo container terminal ====
The terminal has one berth with a quay length of 260 metres. Private berth by Kamigumi.

=== Foodstuff terminal ===
There are two foodstuff terminals opened in February, 1999, Oi marine products and Oi foodstuff, with five berths with a quay length of 1,060 metres and a storage area of 359,000 m^{2}.

=== General cargo ===
The general cargo section of the port has five terminals: one for bulk cargo, one for timber, one for construction materials, one for log handling and one for linear products with a storage area of 900,000 m^{2}, a quay length of 3,500 metres, storage for 200,000 cubic metres of timber and storage for 210,000 tonnes of logs.

=== Automobile terminal ===
The Port of Tokyo has two RoRo terminal with a total length of 1,200 metres, a land area of 100,000 m^{2}, storage capacity of 22,000 cars and a transshipment capacity of 3,500,000 units per year.

=== Passenger Ship terminal ===
- Harumi Passenger Ship terminal - International passenger Ship terminal.
- Takeshiba Passenger Ship terminal - Domestic passenger Ship terminal.
- Tokyo port ferry terminal - Domestic ferry terminal.

== See also ==
- List of East Asian ports
- Tokyo Bay
