= List of Phi Sigma Epsilon chapters =

Phi Sigma Epsilon was a North American social fraternity was founded on February 20, 1910, at Kansas State Normal College, now Emporia State University. It merged with the Phi Sigma Kappa on August 14, 1985. Most Phi Sigma Epsilon chapters participated in the merger. A few chapters and scattered alumni declined the merger, with some eventually forming a new national fraternity Phi Sigma Phi.

Following is a list of Phi Sigma Epsilon chapters, with inactive chapters and institutions indicated in italics.

Chapter	Charter date and range	Institution	Location	Status	Ref.
Alpha	February 20, 1910 – 1974; 1980 – August 14, 1985	Emporia State University	Emporia, Kansas	Merged (ΦΣΚ)	(Note: Chapter became the Alpha Epsilon chapter of Phi Sigma Kappa with the national merger.)
Beta	December 30, 1927	Pittsburg State University	Pittsburg, Kansas	Active	(Note: Chapter formed from Pi Sigma Epsilon, established in 1912.)
Gamma	December 30, 1927 – August 14, 1985	Truman State University	Kirksville, Missouri	Merged (ΦΣΚ)	(Note: Chapter formed from Sigma Delta Tau, established in 1925. It became the Epsilon Gamma chapter of Phi Sigma Kappa with the national merger.)
Delta	1930 – August 14, 1985	Eastern Illinois University	Charleston, Illinois	Merged (ΦΣΚ)	(Note: Chapter formed from Delta Lambda Sigma, established in 1928. It became the Epsilon Delta chapter of Phi Sigma Kappa with the national merger.)
Epsilon	1930 – August 14, 1985	Northeastern State University	Tahlequah, Oklahoma	Merged (ΦΣΚ)	(Note: Chapter formed from Kappa Phi Kappa. It became the Epsilon Epsilon chapter of Phi Sigma Kappa with the national merger.)
Zeta	1930–1979	Fort Hays State University	Hays, Kansas	Inactive	(Note: Chapter formed from Kappa Phi Alpha, established in 1923.)
Eta	1931 – 1960; 1967–1985	Southeastern Oklahoma State University	Durant, Oklahoma	Withdrew	(Note: Chapter formed from the Amigos, established in 1923.) (Note: Withdrew at the time of the merger and became a Founding Seven chapter of Phi Sigma Phi.)
Theta	1931 – August 14, 1985	University of Northern Iowa	Cedar Falls, Iowa	Merged (ΦΣΚ)	(Note: Chapter formed from Alpha Beta Theta, established in 1899. It became the Epsilon Theta chapter of Phi Sigma Kappa with the national merger.)
Iota	1931 – August 14, 1985	University of Central Missouri	Warrensburg, Missouri	Merged (ΦΣΚ)	(Note: Chapter formed from Phi Kappa Alpha, established in 1929. It became the Epsilon Iota chapter of Phi Sigma Kappa with the national merger.)
Kappa	1932 – August 14, 1985	University of Wisconsin–Stevens Point	Stevens Point, Wisconsin	Merged (ΦΣΚ)	(Note: Chapter formed from Phi Lambda Phi, established in 1917. It became the Epsilon Kappa chapter of Phi Sigma Kappa with the national merger.)
Lambda	1934 – August 14, 1985	Eastern Michigan University	Ypsilanti, Michigan	Merged (ΦΣΚ)	(Note: Chapter formed from Chi Delta, established in 1914. With the national merger, it became the Epsilon Lambda chapter of Phi Sigma Kappa AND the Lambda chapter of Phi Sigma Phi which was established by Phi Sigma Epsilon alumni who chose not to merge.)
Mu	1935 – August 14, 1985	University of Central Arkansas	Conway, Arkansas	Merged (ΦΣΚ)	(Note: Chapter formed from Phi Beta Rho, established in 1934. It became the Epsilon Mu chapter of Phi Sigma Kappa with the national merger.)
Nu	1938 – August 14, 1985	Northwest Missouri State University	Maryville, Missouri	Merged (ΦΣΚ)	(Note: Chapter formed from Sigma Mu Delta, established in 1930. It became the Epsilon Nu chapter of Phi Sigma Kappa with the national merger.)
Xi	1941 – August 14, 1985	Central Michigan University	Mt. Pleasant, Michigan	Merged (ΦΣΚ)	(Note: Chapter formed from Gamma Phi, established in 1934. It became the Epsilon Xi chapter of Phi Sigma Kappa with the national merger.)
Omicron	1942–1952	Wayne State University	Detroit, Michigan	Inactive	(Note: Chapter formed from Chega, established in 1922. Its charter was revoked in 1952.)
Pi	1943 – August 14, 1985	Western Illinois University	Macomb, Illinois	Merged (ΦΣΚ)	(Note: Became the Epsilon Pi chapter of Phi Sigma Kappa with the national merger.)
Rho	1946 – August 14, 1985	Henderson State University	Arkadelphia, Arkansas	Merged (ΦΣΚ)	(Note: Became the Epsilon Rho chapter of Phi Sigma Kappa with the national merger.)
Sigma	1947–1976	Northern Illinois University	DeKalb, Illinois	Inactive	(Note: Chapter formed from Alpha Delta Chi, established in 1945.)
Tau	1948 – August 14, 1985	Ball State University	Muncie, Indiana	Merged (ΦΣΚ)	(Note: Chapter formed from Delta Phi Sigma, established in 1926. It became the Epsilon Tau chapter of Phi Sigma Kappa with the national merger.)
Upsilon	1950 – August 14, 1985	University of Wisconsin–Whitewater	Whitewater, Wisconsin	Merged (ΦΣΚ)	(Note: Chapter formed from the League of College Men, established in 1949. It became the Epsilon Upsilon chapter of Phi Sigma with the national merger.)
Phi	1949–1970	University of Wisconsin–Milwaukee	Milwaukee, Wisconsin	Inactive	(Note: Chapter formed from Sigma Delta Phi, established in 1920.)
Chi	1950 – 1954; 1977 – August 14, 1985	State University of New York at Oswego	Oswego, New York	Merged (ΦΣΚ)	(Note: Chapter formed from Pi Lambda Tau, established in 1949. It became the Epsilon Chi chapter of Phi Sigma Kappa with the national merger.)
Psi	1952–1964	State University of New York at Geneseo	Geneseo, New York	Inactive	(Note: Chapter formed from Phi Alpha Zeta, established in 1891. It seceded because of a campus ban on national fraternities but continued operating as Phi Sigma Epsilon (local) until 1992 when it changed its name to Phi Sigma Xi (local).)
Omega	1952–1985	University of Wisconsin–Stout	Menomonie, Wisconsin	Withdrew	(Note: Chapter formed from Kappa Phi Sigma, established in 1929.)
Phi Alpha	1952			Memorial	
Phi Beta	1952–1985	University of Wisconsin–Eau Claire	Eau Claire, Wisconsin	Withdrew	
Phi Delta	1952–1961; 1970 – August 14, 1985	Black Hills State College	Spearfish, South Dakota	Merged (ΦΣΚ)	(Note: Chapter formed from Zeta Sigma Phi, established in 1949.) (Note: With the national merger, this became a new chapter of Phi Sigma Kappa chapter or consolidated with an existing chapter.)
Phi Gamma	1956–1980	Western Michigan University	Kalamazoo, Michigan	Inactive	
Phi Epsilon	1956 – August 14, 1985	Rider University	Lawrenceville, New Jersey	Merged (ΦΣΚ)	(Note: Chapter formed from Sigma Beta Chi, established in 1950.)
Phi Zeta	1958–1972	University of Illinois Urbana-Champaign	Urbana, Illinois	Inactive	
Phi Eta	1959–1972	Clarion University of Pennsylvania	Clarion, Pennsylvania	Inactive	(Note: Chapter formed from the Triangles, established in 1958.)
Phi Theta	1959–1985	Shippensburg University of Pennsylvania	Shippensburg, Pennsylvania	Merged (ΦΣΚ)	
Phi Iota	1959–1985	Northland College	Ashland, Wisconsin	Withdrew	(Note: Chapter formed from Theta Pi, established in 1924.)
Phi Kappa	1959–1985	West Virginia Wesleyan College	Buckhannon, West Virginia	Withdrew	(Note: Chapter formed from Phi Sigma Epsilon, established in 1951.)
Phi Lambda	1956–1972	Parsons College	Fairfield, Iowa	Inactive	(Note: Chapter formed from Lambda Xi Epsilon, established in 1955. It went inactive with the bankruptcy and eventual closure of the college.)
Phi Mu	1960–1985	Concord University	Athens, West Virginia	Withdrew	
Phi Nu	1962–1978	Mansfield State College	Mansfield, Pennsylvania	Inactive	
Phi Xi	1962–1977	Winona State University	Winona, Minnesota	Inactive	
Phi Omicron	1961–1978	St. Cloud State University	St. Cloud, Minnesota	Inactive	
Phi Pi	1961–1976	University of Wisconsin–Superior	Superior, Wisconsin	Inactive	(Note: Chapter formed from Sempres Compores, established in 1942.)
Phi Rho	1963–1972	Chadron State College	Chadron, Nebraska	Inactive	(Note: Chapter formed from Omega Chi Epsilon, established in 1961.)
Phi Sigma	1965 – August 14, 1985	Hillsdale College	Hillsdale, Michigan	Merged (ΦΣΚ)	
Phi Tau	1963–1985	Cornell University	Ithaca, New York	Withdrew	(Note: Chapter formed from the Alpha Beta chapter of Kappa Nu, established in 1951. At the time of the national merger, it withdrew and joined Theta Chi.)
Phi Upsilon	1964 – 19xx ?; 19xx ? – August 14, 1985	Valparaiso University	Valparaiso, Indiana	Merged (ΦΣΚ)	
Phi Phi	1965–1976	University of Wisconsin–Oshkosh	Oshkosh, Wisconsin	Inactive	(Note: Chapter formed from Pi Sigma, established in 1922.)
Phi Chi	1971–1976	Bemidji State University	Bemidji, Minnesota	Inactive	(Note: Chapter formed from Phi Sigma Chi, established in 1965.)
Phi Psi	1970–1975	University of St. Thomas	St. Paul, Minnesota	Inactive	
Phi Omega	1970 – August 14, 1985	Minnesota State University Moorhead	Moorhead, Minnesota	Merged (ΦΣΚ)	(Note: Chapter formed from Sigma Omega, established in 1967.)
Sigma Alpha	1960 – August 14, 1985	University of Wisconsin–La Crosse	La Crosse, Wisconsin	Merged (ΦΣΚ)	(Note: Chapter formed from Alpha Delta Theta, established in 1938.)
Sigma Beta	1967 – August 14, 1985	Missouri State University	Springfield, Missouri	Merged (ΦΣΚ)	
Sigma Gamma	1969 – August 14, 1985	Wayne State College	Wayne, Nebraska	Merged (ΦΣΚ)	
Sigma Delta	1968 – August 14, 1985	St. Norbert College	De Pere, Wisconsin	Merged (ΦΣΚ)	
Sigma Epsilon	1968 – August 14, 1985	Ferris State University	Big Rapids, Michigan	Merged (ΦΣΚ)	
Sigma Zeta	1968 – August 14, 1985	University of Wisconsin–River Falls	River Falls, Wisconsin	Merged (ΦΣΚ)	(Note: Chapter formed from Kappa Theta, established in 1963.)
Sigma Eta	1969 – August 14, 1985	Southeast Missouri State University	Cape Girardeau, Missouri	Merged (ΦΣΚ)	
Sigma Theta	1969–1972	Hofstra University	Hempstead, New York	Inactive	
Sigma Iota	1969–1977; 1980 – August 14, 1985	University of Wisconsin–Platteville	Platteville, Wisconsin	Merged (ΦΣΚ)	(Note: Chapter formed from Philadelphia Society, established in 1866. After going dormant, it reformed in 1985 from Phi Sigma, established in 1977.)
Sigma Kappa	1969–1976	La Salle University	Philadelphia, Pennsylvania	Inactive	
Sigma Lambda	1969–1970	University of Minnesota-Morris	Morris, Minnesota	Inactive	(Note: Chapter formed from Xi Omega, established in 1967.)
Sigma Mu	1969–1970	Manhattan University	Bronx, New York	Inactive	(Note: Chapter formed from Sigma Beta Kappa, established in 1948.)
Sigma Nu	1970 – August 14, 1985	Slippery Rock University	Slippery Rock, Pennsylvania	Merged (ΦΣΚ)	
Sigma Xi	1970–1975	Bloomsburg University of Pennsylvania	Bloomsburg, Pennsylvania	Inactive	
Sigma Tau	1969–1976; 1980–1985	Missouri Western State University	St. Joseph, Missouri	Inactive	
Sigma Chi	1960 – August 14, 1985	Shepherd University	Shepherdstown, West Virginia	Merged (ΦΣΚ)	(Note: Chapter formed from Theta Sigma Chi, established in 1931.)
Sigma Psi		University of Minnesota Duluth	Duluth, Minnesota	Inactive	(Note: This was a colony formed in 1985, the year of the merger. The colony lasted until 1988 and was never chartered.)
