= Dean Rockwell =

American wrestler and coach

- Born: May 25, 1912; Cass County, Michigan, U.S.
- Died: August 8, 2005 (aged 93); Ann Arbor, Michigan, U.S.

Dean Ladrath Rockwell (May 25, 1912 – August 8, 2005)) was a decorated World War II group commander in the D-Day invasion, an Olympic Greco-Roman wrestling coach, and a college football coach.

== Biography ==
After graduating from Eastern Michigan University in 1935, Rockwell taught and coached track, wrestling and football at several Michigan high schools. He also was an auto worker and took part in the Flint Sit-Down Strike in 1936–1937.

On May 17, 1942, Rockwell enlisted in the United States Navy, where he became a group commander of 12 LCT’s during the invasion of Normandy on D-Day, June 6, 1944. Rockwell received both the US Navy Cross and the French Croix de Guerre avec Paume for his decision to break radio silence when faced with what he recognized as a certain disaster. Instead, Rockwell radioed an Army captain which allowed important last-minute changes that aided in the success of the attack and saved thousands of lives. So crucial was Rockwell’s decision that, a half a century later, at the 50th anniversary of D-Day in 1994, Rockwell was given the honor of introducing then-President Bill Clinton. The Navy Cross citation reads, in part: "Rockwell, in the face of very heavy enemy fire, discharged the tanks [he and his men had carried ashore] on the ground. By quick and sound decision he was able to land all these tanks at the correct spot and, by skillful handling, incurred only a minimum of damage to his ships." Author and historian Stephen Ambrose wrote of Rockwell in his book, D-Day, June 6, 1944: The Climactic Battle of World War II: "There was one final bombardment from the sea. It came from Sherman tanks aboard LCTs approaching the shoreline. Under the circumstances - rough water, smoke and haze, extreme excitement - it was wildly inaccurate. But that those Shermans were close enough to the beach to fire was itself a near miracle, made possible by the courage and common sense of one man, Lieutenant Rockwell, who had just made what was perhaps the single most important command decision of any junior officer on D-Day."

After the war, Rockwell studied at the University of Michigan. He went on to coach football at Albion College.

Rockwell also coached at the national and international levels, chairing the US National AAU Wrestling Committee from 1966 to 1968, serving on three Olympic Greco-Roman wrestling committees, and coaching the US Greco-Roman wrestling team at the 1964 Summer Olympics in Tokyo.

In May 1995, Rockwell received the "Master of Wrestling Award" from Wrestling USA magazine. In 2000, the nation's largest wrestling library, the new AAU National Wrestling Hall of Fame, was named the "Dean Rockwell Library and Research Center." In January 2007, Eastern Michigan University named a gymnasium in his honor as the "Dean L. Rockwell Wrestling Facility."

Rockwell was a member of the Phi Sigma Epsilon fraternity while a student at Eastern Michigan, and assisted with the fraternity's reformation as Phi Sigma Phi when most of its chapters merged with Phi Sigma Kappa.

== Head coaching record ==
=== College football ===
| Year | Team | Overall | Conference | Standing | Bowl/playoffs |
|---|---|---|---|---|---|
Albion Britons (Michigan Intercollegiate Athletic Association) (1947)
| 1947 | Albion | 0–8 | 0–5 | 6th | |
| Albion: | | 0–8 | 0–5 | | |
| Total: | | 0–8 | | | |
