= General Allen =

General Allen may refer to:

- Arthur Allen (general) (1894–1959), Australian Army major general
- Augustus F. Allen (1813–1875), New York Militia brigadier general
- Chester R. Allen (1905–1972), U.S. Marine Corps major general
- Ethan Allen (1737–1789), Vermont Republic Militia major general
- Frances J. Allen (fl. 1980s–2020s), Canadian Armed Forces lieutenant general
- George C. Allen II (fl. 1970s–1990s), Delaware Air National Guard brigadier general
- Harrison Allen (general) (1835–1904), Union Army brevet brigadier general
- Henry Tureman Allen (1859–1930), U.S. Army major general
- Henry Watkins Allen (1820–1866), Confederate States Army brigadier general
- Hubert Allison Allen (1872–1942), U.S. Army brigadier general
- James R. Allen (1925–1992), U.S. Air Force four-star general
- John J. Allen (general) (fl. 1990s–2020s), U.S. Air Force major general
- John R. Allen (born 1953), U.S. Marine Corps four-star general
- John R. Allen Jr. (born 1935), U.S. Air Force brigadier general
- Lew Allen (1925–2010), U.S. Air Force four-star general
- Robert Allen (footballer) (1886–1981), British Army major general
- Robert Allen (general) (1811–1886), Union Army brigadier general
- Roderick R. Allen (1894–1970), U.S. Army major general
- William W. Allen (general) (1835–1894), Confederate States Army brigadier general

== See also ==
- Engin Alan (born 1945), Turkish Army general
- William Allan (British Army officer) (1832–1918), British Army major general
- Daniel B. Allyn (born 1959), U.S. Army four-star general
- Attorney General Allen (disambiguation)
