= Phi Sigs =

Phi Sigs is a nickname which might refer to members of either:

- Phi Sigma Kappa (ΦΣΚ) men's social fraternity
- Phi Sigma Epsilon (ΦΣΕ) defunct men's social fraternity
- Phi Sigma Sigma (ΦΣΣ) women's social sorority
