= Erik Fankhouser =

- professional bodybuilder

Personal info
- Nickname: "The House"
- Born: May 30, 1980 (age 44)

Best statistics
- Height: 5 ft 9 in (175 cm)
- Weight: Contest: 215lb; Off season: 265lb

Erik Fankhouser (born May 30, 1980) is a professional American bodybuilder in the sport’s heavyweight class, more properly known these days as the IFBB OPEN class or Division.

Fankhouser began weight training while he was a student at West Liberty State College in West Liberty, West Virginia. He originally focused on playing fullback for the school’s football team and participating in the shot put, discus, hammer and javelin events for the track team, and then turned his focus to bodybuilding. He won his first competitive bodybuilding tournament, the 2004 NPC Upper Ohio Valley, placing first in the junior division. He won the Mr. West Virginia title in the 2005 Mid Atlantic Grand Prix/West Virginia States.

In his first national competition, the 2006 North American Championship, he placed fourth in the heavyweight division. In 2007, he placed 16th in the USA Bodybuilding & Figure Championships, but in his next competition he placed first in his class in the North American Championships. He was also named overall winner for the competition and earned his IFBB pro card at that event. With his victory, Fankhouser made state sports history as the first West Virginia native to become a professional bodybuilder. Erik placed 10th in his first IFBB pro contest, the Europa Super Show, in August 2008, winning both Pose Down Magazine's "Best Wheels" and the 4Ever Fit Fans' Choice awards during the contest.

Fankhouser, who stands 5 ft 9 in (175 cm) and averages 215 lb (98 kg) in contest shape, goes by the nickname “The House.” He is sponsored in his training by the bodybuilding supplement companies Animalpak.com and Universal Nutrition. He has also done guest posing at several bodybuilding tournaments, and writes weight training articles for Muscular Development Magazine.

Outside of competitive bodybuilding, he works as a Coal Miner at Bailey mine for Consol Energy.

== Contest History ==
Year	Contest	Placing
2006	IFBB North American Championships	HeavyWeight, 4th
2007	NPC USA Championships HeavyWeight	DNP
2007	IFBB North American Championships	HeavyWeight & Overall, 1st
2008	IFBB 15th Annual Sports/Fitness Weekend & Europa IFBB Super Show	11th
2009	IFBB Europa Supershow Open	11th
2010	IFBB New York Pro	5th
2010	IFBB Mr. Olympia	18th
