= List of Phi Sigma Kappa chapters =

Phi Sigma Kappa is a men's social and academic fraternity with approximately 65 active chapters and provisional chapters in North America.

== Naming rules ==
Interest groups are named temporarily after the school. Where the fraternity has previously had a presence, re-established groups may refer to themselves by their original chapter name, with the word "Provisional Chapter" appended. Provisional chapters at schools where Phi Sig has not had a presence will be awarded a chapter name as their induction ceremony is scheduled. Where there is a lack of progress or low membership, unsuccessful provisional chapters may be disbanded before receiving a charter or series name.

The 1985 merger resulted in the following naming compromises:

- In cases where an original Phi Sigma Kappa chapter, as well as a Phi Sigma Epsilon chapter, were present on campus but where both are now dormant, the designation of any new group would normally be the name of the older original chapter, with allowances based on alumni preference. See also the main section on Naming System.
- Phi Sigma Epsilon's practice was to name interest groups and colonies immediately. Because some colonies earned their charter within months, and others took up to four years, this resulted in a chapter roster that wasn't strictly alphabetical when listed by date of founding. The roster today, and this page, is maintained by chartering date, following Phi Sigma Kappa's practice. Buttons on the header field allow readers to sort by state, school, status, etc.
- Occasionally, a PSE colony was allowed a name that referenced a former local fraternity's original name: Shepherd College's Sigma Chi chapter of Phi Sigma Kappa, for example, which honors their former local name Theta Sigma Chi.
- Several Sigma-series names were never assigned, and there are no plans to use them.

== Chapters ==
Following is a list of Phi Sigma Kappa chapters. Active chapters are indicated in bold. Inactive chapters are in italics.

| Chapter | Charter date and range | Institution | Location | Status | Chapter houses | Ref. |
|---|---|---|---|---|---|---|
| **Alpha** | March 15, 1873 | University of Massachusetts Amherst | Amherst, Massachusetts | Active | ^{[pic1][pic2] [pic3]} | (Note: Alpha chapter called itself "Pi" from 1878 to 1887 because this was the initial letter of the Greek word for "first." Similarly, the Beta chapter was the "Alden March chapter", after the name of the founder of that college. These chapters took the names Alpha and Beta, respectively, when the petition came from the group that would become Phi Sig's Gamma chapter at Cornell.) (Note: This chapter's alumni club is the Alpha Chapter Housing Corp.) |
| Beta | 1888–1997 | Union College | Schenectady, New York | Inactive | ^{[pic1]} | (Note: The Albany chapter (affiliated with the medical and law college) created a satellite chapter at the main campus of Union College in Schenectady in 1922 by absorbing the Terrace Club, formed in 1917. The Schenectady group absorbed the Albany parent and the charter was moved no later than 1930.) (Note: This chapter's alumni club is the Union Beta Alumni Association, PSK.) |
| **Gamma** (see Phi Tau) | 1889 | Cornell University | Ithaca, New York | Active | ^{[pic1][pic2] [pic3]} | (Note: Phi Sigma Kappa's merger with Phi Sigma Epsilon meant the occasional merger of alumni groups on campuses where both fraternities had or previously had a presence. At the 1985 merger, both may have been inactive, or one may have been active with the other dormant, or since that time a chapter may have been re-colonized, usually taking on the older chapter's name from that campus. At Cornell where both fraternities had an active chapter at the time of the merger, the younger chapter was released.) (Note: Gamma's alumni club is the Gamma Chapter House Association.) |
| Delta | 1891–2023 | West Virginia University | Morgantown, West Virginia | Inactive | ^{[pic1][pic2] [pic3]} | (Note: The chapter formed from the Columbia Literary Society. Its alumni club is the Cap't. Kimble White Alumni Club.) |
| Epsilon (Sachem Hall) | 1893–1929 | Yale University | New Haven, Connecticut | Inactive | ^{[pic1]} | (Note: The oldest traditional fraternities (~junior societies) at Yale named their buildings with "Hall" nicknames, by which they wished to be known on campus: Thus Phi Sigma Kappa's Epsilon chapter adopted the name Sachem Hall. Similarly, the Theta Xi chapter was Franklin Hall, Delta Psi adopted the name St. Anthony Hall which spread to their entire small but old national fraternity, Chi Delta Theta (local literary honorary) established the Manuscript Society, Sigma Delta Chi (local) was renamed the Cloister Club which soon became Book and Snake. Phi Gamma Delta (FIJI) was Vernon Hall which later became Myth and Sword, Chi Phi was York Hall, Psi Upsilon became the Fence Club, and finally, Delta Phi, another small but old national was known at Yale as St. Elmo's. ΦΣΚ's Sachem Hall was located at 124 Prospect Street. ("Chapter News: Yale Fraternities Face Oblivion". The Signet, vol XXVII, no. 3, January 1935, pg 112.) |
| Zeta | 1896–1973 | City College of New York | New York City, New York | Inactive | | (Note: This chapter's alumni club is the Zeta Chapter Alumni Association, which maintains a scholarship fund administered by the national fraternity.) |
| Eta | 1897–2002; 2011–2024 | University of Maryland, College Park | College Park, Maryland | Inactive | ^{[pic1][pic2]} | (Note: This chapter was established through the work of Epsilon chapter and a transfer student from Delta chapter. During incorporation, and while planning to become a chapter of ΦΣΚ, this group took the local name of the Secret Order of the Skull and Coffin (The Signet, Fall 2017, vol. CVIII, no. 1, p. 2). Beginning in 1922, a satellite chapter was established on the College Park campus, eventually absorbing the Baltimore group. The charter moved from the Baltimore campus to College Park in 1923.) (Note: This chapter's alumni club is the Eta Chapter Alumni Association.) |
| Theta | 1897–1933 | Columbia University | New York City, New York | Inactive | ^{[pic1]} | (Note: This chapter was established by the Council and the work of the Zeta chapter at CCNY, with whom they often shared a residence.) |
| **Iota** | 1899 | Stevens Institute of Technology | Hoboken, New Jersey | Active | ^{[pic1]} | (Note: This chapter was established largely through the work of a brother from the Zeta chapter at CCNY. Its alumni club is the Iota Association - Phi Sigma Kappa.) |
| **Kappa** | 1899 | Pennsylvania State University | State College, Pennsylvania | Active | ^{[pic1][pic2]} | (Note: The chapter was formed from the local fraternity Phi Delta Epsilon, established as Bon Amis in 1891. The chapter's alumni club is the PSK Association of State College.) |
| Lambda | 1899–1971; 1977–2020 | George Washington University | Washington, D.C. | Inactive | ^{[pic1]} | (Note: Chapter was established through the work of members of the Gamma chapter at Cornell. Its alumni club is the Washington Club of PSK.) |
| Mu | 1900–1997; 2001–2007; 2013–2016 | University of Pennsylvania | Philadelphia, Pennsylvania | Inactive | ^{[pic1]} | (Note: Chapter was started by a member of Gamma chapter at Cornell, who had a brother enrolled at Penn. Its alumni club is the Mu Association.) |
| Nu | 1901–2023 | Lehigh University | Bethlehem, Pennsylvania | Inactive | ^{[pic1]} | (Note: This chapter's alumni club is the PSK Alumni Association, Nu Chapter.) |
| Xi | 1902–2004 | St. Lawrence University | Canton, New York | Inactive | ^{[pic1][pic2]} | (Note: Chapter formed from the local group "Decemvirs", established earlier in 1902. The formation of the chapter came about through the efforts of national interfraternity leader, William Raimond Baird, a member of Beta Theta Pi.) |
| **Omicron** | 1902 | Massachusetts Institute of Technology | Cambridge, Massachusetts | Active | ^{[pic1][pic2]} | (Note: This chapter was established through the work of members from Zeta chapter at CCNY. This chapter's alumni club is the Alumni Association of Omicron Chapter.) |
| Pi | 1903–1983 | Franklin & Marshall College | Lancaster, Pennsylvania | Inactive | ^{[pic1][pic2]} | (Note: Beginning in the late 1960s, several small eastern schools banned their fraternity systems out of egalitarian concerns, leading to alarm among fraternity executives that such a trend would be more widespread. However, their worst fears did not come to pass, and the trend fizzled. Some schools, reporting a marked drop in alumni giving, rescinded such bans. For example, former long-time Phi Sig campuses Swarthmore College and Franklin and Marshall now allow Greek organizations to re-charter. Nevertheless, PSK's Chi chapter at Williams College fell to the anti-Greek trend in 1966 and remains closed to recognized expansion today.) (Note: Chapter formed from the Nevonia Club, established in 1897. It became Pi chapter when encouraged by men from Mu chapter at Penn.) |
| Rho | 1903–1914 | Queen's University | Kingston, Ontario, Canada | Inactive | | (Note: Chapter was started by a Gamma chapter brother, and inducted with help from the Xi chapter at St. Lawrence.) (Note: Greek systems have died out on some campuses. At times when the United States or Canada has entered a wartime posture or a period of significant manpower draft, such as the Civil War, World War I or World War II, weaker chapters of many fraternities have had to close, with some unable to recover after the war. Campus acceptance can vary, making re-establishment far more difficult: Fraternities and sororities remain unwelcome at Queen's University, of Kingston, Ontario where PSK's Rho chapter failed when all members of the chapter died in service or failed to return after duty in World War I . In response to efforts by other fraternities to form or re-form on the campus in the 1920s, the university's student senate banned Greek societies in 1933. Likewise at St. John's College, in Annapolis, Maryland, PSK's Sigma chapter failed to reopen after World War II. Neither school has fraternities or sororities today.) |
| Sigma | 1903–1940 | St. John's College | Annapolis, Maryland | Inactive | | (Note: This chapter was started by a brother from Eta chapter) |
| Tau | 1905–1956 | Dartmouth College | Hanover, New Hampshire | Withdrew | | (Note: Chapter separated from the national organization in 1956 over the issue of racial discrimination and became Phi Tau coeducational local fraternity. Two months later, the short-lived policies that incited the separation were themselves dropped, and Phi Sigma Kappa became one of the first fraternities to welcome black students.) (Note: There exists some confusion regarding two chapters named Phi Tau. Phi Sigma Epsilon's Phi Tau chapter at Cornell was present from 1963 until the merger with Phi Sigma Kappa in 1985 when it was released to join another national. The Fraternity retained its much older, original Gamma chapter. The former PSE chapter there should NOT be confused with Phi Sigma Kappa's Tau chapter at Dartmouth, which, upon seceding from the national fraternity in 1956, renamed itself Phi Tau. Name similarity is purely coincidental.) |
| Upsilon | 1906–1939 | Brown University | Providence, Rhode Island | Inactive | | |
| Phi | 1906–1991 | Swarthmore College | Swarthmore, Pennsylvania | Inactive | ^{[pic1]} | |
| Chi | 1906–1966 | Williams College | Williamstown, Massachusetts | Inactive | ^{[pic1][pic2] [pic3]} | (Note: Chapter was started with the aid of members of Beta chapter from a local called the Phi Society that had formed in 1905. All fraternity chapters at Williams are now closed.) |
| **Psi** | 1907–1916; 1921–1936; 1954–1981; 1985 | University of Virginia | Charlottesville, Virginia | Active | ^{[pic1]} | (Note: Chapter formed from a local fraternity, Delta Omega, established in 1905. Its alumni club is the Column Club, Inc.) |
| Omega | 1909–1992 | University of California, Berkeley | Berkeley, California | Inactive | | (Note: Sigma Phi Sigma was a fraternity of 18 chapters that was unable to re-kindle itself after World War II. Several of its largest groups affiliated with Phi Sigma Kappa, merging assets for the benefit of the combined organization after SPS's dissolution in 1947. These include an exceptionally sound chapter at Cal Berkeley, which merged into PSK's Omega chapter, and most of the ex-Nevada and Wisconsin chapter members who also sought PSK. Alumni of the dormant Wisconsin chapters of both SPS and PSK merged their assets and worked together to re-establish Zeta Deuteron on the Wisconsin campus, where it had been defunct since 1931. The fine relationship PSK enjoyed with SPS at its dissolution was spurred by "notably excellent relations with PSK's Bro. Dean Palm and Bro. Bill Wood." (Bairds, page VIII-23 and "California Sigma Phi Sigma joins Phi Sigma Kappa", The Signet, A Magazine for Members of Phi Sigma Kappa Fraternity: Vol XXXIX, No. 4, pg 309, November 1947)) (Note: Chapter was originally the Ridgeroad Club, established in 1905. After WWII, the chapter merged with the Berkeley chapter of Sigma Phi Sigma, a small national fraternity. Omega's alumni club is the Omega Alumni of Phi Sigma Kappa.) |
| **Alpha Deuteron** (see Phi Zeta) | May 10, 1910–2008; 2012 | University of Illinois Urbana-Champaign | Champaign, Illinois | Active | ^{[pic1]} | (Note: The chapter gained members from the Iota chapter of Chi Tau, a small national founded at Duke University that had ceased operations nationally in 1929 but whose Illinois chapter continued operations as a local, merging into Alpha Deuteron in 1933. (The Iota chapter of Chi Tau was formed in 1927 but was originally a local called Delta Pi Epsilon, formed in 1925, two years earlier.) They had been neighbors, residing at 312 E. Daniel between 1928 and 1933. Decades earlier, the original local that formed Alpha Deuteron was the Argos Club. Argos was chartered as a not-for-profit corporation on Dec 13, 1905, according to the biennial report of the Illinois Secretary of State, p.41, accessed 30 March 2019) (Note: The chapter's alumni club is the PSK Assn of Illinois.) |
| **Beta Deuteron** | May 12, 1910 | University of Minnesota | Minneapolis, Minnesota | Active | ^{[pic1][pic2]} | (Note: The chapter formed from a local called the FLX Club, established in September 1908. The chapter's alumni club is the Triton Corporation.) |
| Alpha Epsilon | 1910–1989; 1994–2007; December 8, 2018 – 2019 | Emporia State University | Emporia, Kansas | Inactive | | (Note: This is the founding chapter of Phi Sigma Epsilon national fraternity, which grew to 60 chapters and eventually merged with Phi Sigma Kappa in 1985. It was formed on 20 February 1910. The chapter's alumni club is the PSK Alpha Epsilon Alumni Association.) |
| Gamma Deuteron | 1911–1939 | Iowa State University | Ames, Iowa | Inactive | | |
| Delta Deuteron | 1915–199x?; 2003–2005; 2015–2023 | University of Michigan | Ann Arbor, Michigan | Inactive | ^{[pic1]} | (Note: Originating as the Pylon Club, a six-year-old local, its joining Phi Sigma Kappa was strongly supported by alumni from Alpha and Omicron chapters. The chapter's alumni club is the Delta Deuteron Alumni Club.) |
| **Epsilon Deuteron** | 1915 | Worcester Polytechnic Institute | Worcester, Massachusetts | Active | | (Note: The chapter's alumni club is Kappa Xi Alpha of WPI, Inc., in honor of their original local fraternity, Kappa Xi Alpha. This predecessor group was formed in 1902. It has been suggested to Phi Sigma Kappa as a potential new chapter by inter-fraternal friends at Beta Theta Pi national fraternity after a member of Chi chapter at Williams had previously recommended a local at Williams to that fraternity.) |
| Zeta Deuteron | 1917–1931; 1954–1973 | University of Wisconsin–Madison | Madison, Wisconsin | Inactive | | (Note: Sigma Phi Sigma was a fraternity of 18 chapters that was unable to rekindle itself after World War II. Several of its largest groups affiliated with Phi Sigma Kappa, merging their assets for the benefit of the combined organization after SPS's dissolution in 1947. These include an exceptionally sound chapter at Cal Berkeley, which merged into PSK's Omega chapter, and most of the ex-Nevada and Wisconsin chapter members who also sought PSK. Alumni of the dormant Wisconsin chapters of both SPS and PSK merged their assets and worked together to re-establish Zeta Deuteron on the Wisconsin campus, where it had been defunct since 1931. The fine relationship PSK enjoyed with SPS at its dissolution was spurred by "notably excellent relations with PSK's Bro. Dean Palm and Bro. Bill Wood." (Bairds, page VIII-23 and "California Sigma Phi Sigma joins Phi Sigma Kappa", The Signet, A Magazine for Members of Phi Sigma Kappa Fraternity: Vol XXXIX, No. 4, pg 309, November 1947)) (Note: Chapter formed kappa Phi Gamma, a local fraternity formed in 1907 and existent for ten years, with the support of a faculty member who was an alumnus of Alpha Deuteron. After WWII, the chapter revived with the addition of members of the Wisconsin chapter of Sigma Phi Sigma, a small national fraternity that was at risk of failure due to wartime stress.) |
| Eta Deuteron | 1917–1987; 1994–1998 | University of Nevada, Reno | Reno, Nevada | Inactive | | (Note: Chapter formed from Sigma Alpha, a local fraternity established in 1886. It benefited from the support of a transfer student from Omega at Berkeley. After WWII, the chapter revived with the addition of members of the Nevada Reno chapter of Sigma Phi Sigma, a small national that was at risk of failure due to wartime stress.) |
| Theta Deuteron | 1921–1973; 1989–2001 | Oregon State University | Corvallis, Oregon | Inactive | ^{[pic1]} | (Note: Chapter formed from the Umpqua Club, established in 1915, which had changed its name to Zeta Epsilon, in 1918, then sought entry into Phi Sigma Kappa "based on its profile in Baird's," according to the national history. The chapter's alumni club is the Theta Deuteron Alumni Assn of PSK.) |
| Iota Deuteron | 1923–1941 | Kansas State University | Manhattan, Kansas | Inactive | | (Note: The original local chapter name was Phi Delta Tau, which had formed in 1918, petitioning Phi Sigma Kappa under the strong backing of a professor who was a member of Gamma Deuteron.) |
| **Kappa Deuteron** | 1923 | Georgia Tech | Atlanta, Georgia | Active | | (Note: Original local chapter name was Delta Kappa Sigma, formed in 1922. The chapter's alumni club is K.D. Tech, Inc.) |
| Lambda Deuteron | 1923–1960; 1964–1975; 1979–1992 | University of Washington | Seattle, Washington | Inactive | | (Note: The original local chapter name, the Apres La Guerre Club (French, for "After the War") was formed in 1920.) |
| Mu Deuteron | 1923–1972 | University of Montana | Missoula, Montana | Inactive | ^{[pic1]} | (Note: The original local chapter name, Iota Nu, was established in 1908.) |
| Nu Deuteron | 1923–1973 | Stanford University | Stanford, California | Inactive | | (Note: Chapter formed from the Embarcadero Club, a local fraternity established in 1920.) (Note: In its biggest loss to the co-ed movement which affected some fraternities on a few campuses in the 1970s, Phi Sigma Kappa's Nu Deuteron chapter at Stanford University voted to admit women in 1973, and thus voluntarily removed itself from the national fraternity by 'going local'. Ironically, this action came just before the reintroduction of sororities on campus due to Title IX. Continuing as a local to this day, its former building was retained by the group, still named the "Phi Sig" house, as one of many cooperative housing entities on campus. Its co-ed residents are called "Phi Sigs." However, this group has no connection with the national fraternity at this time. Phi Sigma Kappa has expressed a long-term goal of re-establishing itself on legacy campuses it has lost, such as Stanford.) |
| **Xi Deuteron** | 1925–2017; 2023 | University of Tennessee | Knoxville, Tennessee | Active | ^{[pic1][pic2]} | (Note: Chapter was formed from Omega Beta Sigma (local), established in 1921. Its alumni club is the Xi Deuteron Alumni Assn of PSK. After a two year recolonization period, it was re-chartered on November 1, 2025.) |
| **Omicron Deuteron** | 1925–1990; 1992–1999; 2007 | University of Alabama | Tuscaloosa, Alabama | Active | ^{[pic1]} | (Note: Chapter formed from a local called Phi Tau Omega, established in 1923. Its alumni club is the Omicron Deuteron Alumni Club.) |
| **Pi Deuteron** | 1925–1935; 1946–1975; 2014 | Ohio State University | Columbus, Ohio | Active | ^{[pic1]} | (Note: Chapter formed from Pi Alpha Chi, a local fraternity established in 1912.) |
| Rho Deuteron | 1925–1985; 1989–2014 | Gettysburg College | Gettysburg, Pennsylvania | Inactive | | (Note: The PSK-Druid Alumni Association's website, accessed 14 July 2016, notes that Rho Deuteron began as a local fraternity, the Druids, which formed in 1897. The chapter is currently inactive, but alumni retained their property with year-by-year rentals; with HQ they planned to recolonize in 2019-2020, but held off due to the pandemic that year.) |
| Sigma Deuteron | 1925–1941; September 2026 | University of Nebraska | Lincoln, Nebraska | Provisional | | (Note: Chapter formed from Silver Lynx, a local fraternity established in 1913. The Nebraska campus is targeted for expansion in Fall of 2026.) |
| Tau Deuteron | 1926–1937 | Carnegie-Mellon University | Pittsburgh, Pennsylvania | Inactive | | (Note: Chapter formed from Delta Chi Rho, a local fraternity established in 1922.) |
| Upsilon Deuteron | 1926–1935; 1967–1982 | University of North Carolina at Chapel Hill | Chapel Hill, North Carolina | Inactive | | (Note: Chapter formed from Theta Rho, a local fraternity established in 1923.) |
| **Phi Deuteron** | 1926 | University of Kentucky | Lexington, Kentucky | Active | ^{[pic1][pic2]} | (Note: Chapter formed from Chi Sigma Alpha, a local fraternity established in 1922. Its alumni club is the Phi Deuteron Chapter of PSK.) |
| **Chi Deuteron** | 1926–2005; 2015 | Washington State University | Pullman, Washington | Active | ^{[pic1][pic2]} | (Note: Chapter formed from Beta Chi Alpha, a local fraternity established in 1922. Its alumni club is the Chi Deuteron Alumni Club.) |
| Psi Deuteron | 1926–1956; 1958–1966; 2002–200x ? | University of Oregon | Eugene, Oregon | Inactive | | (Note: This chapter originated from a local called Lambda Psi, which formed on May 2, 1923.) |
| **Beta Epsilon** | 1927–19xx ?; 1985–1987; 2000 | Pittsburg State University | Pittsburg, Kansas | Active | | (Note: Originating as a local fraternity named Pi Sigma Epsilon formed in 1912, this chapter became one of the three that constituted Phi Sigma Epsilon when it became a national order in 1927. The chapter's alumni club is the PSK Beta Epsilon Alumni Corp.) |
| **Gamma Epsilon** | 1927 | Truman State University | Kirksville, Missouri | Active | | (Note: Originating as a local chapter named Sigma Delta Tau that had formed in 1924, this chapter became one of the three that constituted Phi Sigma Epsilon when it became a national order in 1927. Not to be confused with the national sorority of that same name. Its alumni club is the Gamma Epsilon Alumni Association.) |
| **Omega Deuteron** | 1928–2003; 2011 | University of Southern California | Los Angeles, California | Active | ^{[pic2]} | (Note: Chapter formed from Phi Alpha Mu, a local fraternity established in 1921. Its alumni club is the Signet Circle Corporation.) |
| Alpha Triton | 1928–1952 | Wesleyan University | Middletown, Connecticut | Inactive | | (Note: Origination of this chapter was a local called Gamma Psi, which was formed in 1919.) |
| Beta Triton | 1928–1955 | Knox College | Galesburg, Illinois | Withdrew | ^{[pic1]} | (Note: 1952's "Bedford Resolution" was one of the reasons that led to the expulsion of Mu Triton at Boston University, which lost its charter in 1954. Similarly, Beta Triton at Knox seceded back to local status in 1955. Hartwick College's Nu Triton was closed for the same reason, also in 1955. All three are today dormant.) (Note: Origination of this chapter was from a local called Alpha Theta Alpha (The Archive says it was Alpha Theta Alpha), which formed in 1921. After seceding from ΦΣΚ it became a short-lived local called Alpha Delta Epsilon.) |
| **Gamma Triton** | 1929–1963; 2004 | University of South Carolina | Columbia, South Carolina | Active | ^{[pic1]} | (Note: Origination of this chapter was a local group called the Hermes Club, which formed in 1925.) |
| Epsilon Delta | 1930–1986 | Eastern Illinois University | Charleston, Illinois | Inactive | | (Note: Originating in 1928 as a Beta chapter of the local group Delta Lambda Sigma at Indiana State Teachers College in Terre Haute, this chapter shifted its attention to become the fourth unit of Phi Sigma Epsilon soon after that new national fraternity had been created.) |
| **Epsilon Epsilon** | 1930 | Northeastern State University | Tahlequah, Oklahoma | Active | | (Note: Originated as a local named Kappa Phi Kappa, not to be confused with the professional education fraternity of that same name.) |
| Delta Triton | 1930–2024 | Purdue University | West Lafayette, Indiana | Inactive | ^{[pic1]} | (Note: Originated from a local called the Agathon Club which formed in 1910. Its alumni club is the Delta Triton Alumni Association.) |
| Epsilon Zeta | 1930–1979 | Fort Hays State University | Hays, Kansas | Inactive | | |
| Epsilon Eta | 1931–19xx ?; 1985–1985; 1995–2001 | Southeastern State University | Durant, Oklahoma | Inactive | | (Note: The chapter's predecessor was Alpha Theta Beta, formed in 1899.) |
| Epsilon Theta | 1931–1998 | University of Northern Iowa | Cedar Falls, Iowa | Inactive | | (Note: Originated as a local society called the Omigos (possibly a typo for Amigos) which had formed in 1923. This group left Phi Sigma Epsilon in 1960 to become a local called Lambda Psi Omega, which was restored as Phi Sigma Epsilon in 1967.) |
| **Epsilon Iota** | 1931 | University of Central Missouri | Warrensburg, Missouri | Active | | (Note: Originated in 1929 as a local chapter called Phi Kappa Alpha, not to be confused with locals at Freed-Hardeman University in TN nor Hope College in MI. Its alumni club is the Epsilon Iota Alumni Club.) |
| Epsilon Kappa | 1931–1998 | University of Wisconsin–Stevens Point | Stevens Point, Wisconsin | Withdrew | | (Note: The Epsilon Kappa chapter of Phi Sigma Kappa separated from the national organization in 1998 and became a local organization called Phi Sigma Chi fraternity. This is not to be confused with the NY-based multicultural fraternity of Phi Sigma Chi, with which the Stevens Point chapter has no connection. This now-local chapter has disbanded.) |
| Epsilon Lambda (see Chi Pentaton) | 1934–2023 | Eastern Michigan University | Ypsilanti, Michigan | Inactive | | (Note: Originated as a local, first named Chi Delta which formed in 1914, and then as Mu Sigma Chi, before joining Phi Sigma Epsilon. This chapter's combined alumni club is Epsilon Lambda Alumni Chapter, in honor of the older of the two groups that led to its formation.) |
| Epsilon Mu | 1985–1991; 2002 | University of Central Arkansas | Conway, Arkansas | Inactive | | (Note: Chapter formed from a local society called The Owls which became a local chapter called Phi Beta Rho in 1934. (No connection with the fraternity in the Philippines of that same name). The campus Dean of Men suggested they nationalize, referring the chapter to join Phi Sigma Epsilon.) |
| **Epsilon Triton** | 1936 | American University | Washington, D.C. | Active | | (Note: The origin of this chapter was from a local called Phi Beta Zeta which formed in 1929. Its alumni club is the PSK Alumni Club of Epsilon Triton.) |
| **Epsilon Nu** | 1938 | Northwest Missouri State University | Maryville, Missouri | Active | | (Note: Originated as a local, named Sigma Mu Delta formed in 1930, before joining Phi Sigma Epsilon. Not to be confused with the pre-med professional fraternity of that same name, founded a century later. Its alumni club is Epsilon Nu-Phi Sigma Kappa, Inc.) |
| **Zeta Triton** | 1939–2009; 2024 | Montana State University | Bozeman, Montana | Provisional | | (Note: Baird's Manual says this chapter formed from a local called Beta Sigma. The Archive notes it came from a local called Omega Beta formed in 1915.) |
| Epsilon Xi | 1985–1944; 1999–2010 | Central Michigan University | Mount Pleasant, Michigan | Inactive | | (Note: Originated in 1934 as a local named the Senate Social Club, later changing its name to Gamma Phi. (No relation to the national sorority of the same name.)) |
| Epsilon Omicron | 1942–1952 | Wayne State University | Detroit, Michigan | Inactive | | (Note: It appears that, at the time of the merger, the chapter at Wayne State University of Detroit was forgotten in the lists, probably because of confusion with the similarly named Wayne State College of Nebraska. The chapter is missing in Hills and Star editions through 2013, missing from Baird's Manual, and only found in the chapter list on pg. 250 of All the Phi Sigs. on p.255. ATPS notes Omicron [of PSE's] (thus Epsilon Omicron's) charter at Wayne State University was "revoked", clarified on p.194 that this occurred in November of 1952 or 1953). This Michigan group had originated as a local in 1922 named The Cheese Gang, later changing its name to Chega. The Wayne State University group may have voluntarily ceased participation in Phi Sigma Epsilon, as in 1956 the group accepted a charter as a chapter of Delta Chi. As to the chapter at Wayne State College, while it was chartered in 1969, records are unclear as to its closing year. The Archive simply notes its closure in 1985, the year of the merger, but this event occurred earlier.) (Note: Chapter's charter was revoked.) |
| Eta Triton | 1942–2013; April 27, 2018 – 2024 | University of Akron | Akron, Ohio | Inactive | | (Note: This chapter's origination was Alpha Sigma Omicron, a local fraternity formed in 1920. Its alumni club is the PSK Club of Akron.) |
| Epsilon Pi | 1943–2003 | Western Illinois University | Macomb, Illinois | Inactive | | (Note: Originated specifically as a group aiming to join Phi Sigma Epsilon.) |
| Epsilon Rho | 1946–2014; 2019–202x ? | Henderson State University | Arkadelphia, Arkansas | Inactive | | (Note: Originated with encouragement from the Dean of Men, who had similarly encouraged the formation of the Mu chapter at Conway, AR while posted there. Its alumni club is the Epsilon Rho Alumni Assn of PSK.) |
| Theta Triton | 1947–1976 | University of Texas at Austin | Austin, Texas | Inactive | ^{[pic1][pic2][pic3]} | |
| Iota Triton | 1947–1972 | University of Connecticut | Storrs, Connecticut | Inactive | ^{[pic1]} | |
| Kappa Triton | 1947–1959 | Fresno State University | Fresno, California | Inactive | | (Note: This chapter originated in the local group Sigma Beta Mu, formed in 1946. Formation supported by members of Omega and Nu Deuteron.) |
| Epsilon Sigma (see **Pi Pentaton**) | 1947–1976 | Northern Illinois University | DeKalb, Illinois | Active | | (Note: Chapter formed from Alpha Delta Chi, a local fraternity formed in 1945 (no relation to the national Christian sorority of the same name), according to yearbook records accessed 26 Jun 2017. Closure year estimated: The last "Norther" yearbook mention of Sigma (later reformed as Epsilon Sigma chapter), was in 1974. Yearbook commentary notes a severe downturn of the Greek system on that campus, coinciding from 1971-73, which likely was the ultimate cause of the chapter's closure. Alumni of both groups are welcomed by the Pi Pentaton chapter and alumni.) |
| **Epsilon Tau** | 1948 | Ball State University | Muncie, Indiana | Active | | (Note: Originating as a local formed in 1922 named Delta Phi Sigma, it became Tau of Phi Sigma Epsilon. Its alumni club is the PSE Alumni Club of PSK, Inc.) |
| Lambda Triton | 1948–1999 | University of Rhode Island | Kingston, Rhode Island | Inactive | ^{[pic1]} | (Note: Originated from a local chapter named Phi Sigma that had formed in 1925 but closed during WWII. Supported in re-establishment by members of nearby chapters.) |
| Mu Triton | 1948–1953 | Boston University | Boston, Massachusetts | Inactive | | (Note: Originated from a local chapter that had closed during WWII, Kappa Phi Alpha was supported by members of nearby chapters. Reverted to local status in 1954 until 1961 when it merged with the existing chapter of ΤΚΕ, which failed in 1971.) |
| Nu Triton | 1948–1955 | Hartwick College | Oneonta, New York | Inactive | ^{[pic1]} | (Note: Originated from a local chapter that had closed during WWII, Alpha Delta Omega which had formed in 1929. Its restoration and entry into ΦΣΚ was supported by members of nearby chapters.) |
| Xi Triton | 1948–1966 | San Jose State University | San Jose, California | Inactive | | (Note: Originated from a local chapter, Gamma Gamma Gamma which formed in 1940. Sought ΦΣΚ when encouraged by members of Omega at Cal and Nu Deuteron at Stanford. Its alumni club is the Xi Triton Alumni Association.) |
| Omicron Triton | 1948–1973 | University of California, Davis | Davis, California | Inactive | ^{[pic1]} | (Note: Originated from a local chapter, Zeta Xi, formed in 1911. Formation supported by members of Omega at Cal and Nu Deuteron at Stanford.) |
| Pi Triton | 1948–1952 | Eastern Washington University | Cheney, Washington | Inactive | | (Note: The chapter had its origin in Chi Rho, a local fraternity formed in 1946.) |
| Rho Triton | 1949–1959 | San Diego State University | San Diego, California | Inactive | | (Note: The chapter originated from a local fraternity. Its formation was supported by members of Omega and Nu Deuteron.) |
| **Sigma Triton** | 1949–1972; 1991–1998; 2001 | Indiana University Bloomington | Bloomington, Indiana | Active | ^{[pic1]} | (Note: The chapter's alumni club is the Sigma Triton Alumni Club.) |
| **Epsilon Phi** (see Mu Pentaton) | 1949–1970; 1985–1991; 2xxx ? | University of Wisconsin–Milwaukee | Milwaukee, Wisconsin | Active | | (Note: The chapter had its origin in a local fraternity called Sigma Delta Phi, which formed in 1920. Its combined alumni club is the PSK-Epsilon Phi Alumni Club.) |
| Tau Triton | 1949–1955 | Baldwin Wallace College | Berea, Ohio | Inactive | ^{[pic1]} | (Note: Originated from the local Cardinal Club formed in 1949 with the express purpose of pursuing a national fraternity affiliation, supported by members of nearby chapters.) |
| Upsilon Triton | 1949–1955 | Muhlenberg College | Allentown, Pennsylvania | Inactive | | (Note: In 1955 reverted to became local Alpha Mu Iota, which in 1958 became a chapter of ΤΚΕ. This ΤΚΕ chapter survived until 2003, per the Archive, accessed in 2021.) |
| Phi Triton | 1949–1993 | Idaho State University | Pocatello, Idaho | Inactive | | (Note: This chapter had its origin in Zeta Mu, a local fraternity. The Phi Triton chapter was the first fraternity of any national fraternity on the campus, supported in formation by members of nearby chapters.) |
| Chi Triton | 1949–2001; 2009–2011 | Arizona State University | Tempe, Arizona | Inactive | | |
| Psi Triton | 1950–1997; 2009–2019 | Hobart College | Geneva, New York | Inactive | | (Note: This chapter had its origin in Alpha Pi Delta, a local fraternity formed in 1948. Its alumni club is the Psi Triton Alumni Club.) |
| Epsilon Upsilon | 1950–2007 | University of Wisconsin–Whitewater | Whitewater, Wisconsin | Inactive | | |
| Omega Triton | 1950–1986 | Florida Southern College | Lakeland, Florida | Inactive | | (Note: This chapter had its origin in Pi Alpha, a local fraternity formed in 1947.) |
| Alpha Tetarton | 1950–1952 | Linfield College | Portland, Oregon | Inactive | | (Note: This chapter had its origin in Tau Delta Sigma, a local fraternity that formed in 1925.) |
| **Beta Tetarton** | 1950 | Kent State University | Kent, Ohio | Active | | (Note: Originated as Tau Kappa, a local fraternity formed in 1949. ITS alumni club is the Beta Tetarton Alumni Club.) |
| **Gamma Tetarton** | 1950 | Rensselaer Polytechnic Institute | Troy, New York | Active | ^{[pic1]} | (Note: This chapter's alumni club is the Gamma Tetarton Alumni PSK.) |
| Epsilon Psi | 1950–1953 | State University of New York at Geneseo | Geneseo, New York | Withdrew | | (Note: Early in 1954, the courts upheld the NY State University System's decision to ban national fraternities. Thus Phi Sigma Epsilon's Chi (Epsilon Chi) and Psi (Epsilon Psi) were placed in inactive status, with Psi never recovering.) |
| Delta Tetarton | 1951–1959; 1993–2000; 2014–2017 | University of Florida | Gainesville, Florida | Inactive | ^{[pic1]} | (Note: This chapter's alumni club is the Delta Tetarton Alumni Association.) |
| Epsilon Tetarton | 1952–1972 | Washington College | Chestertown, Maryland | Inactive | | (Note: This chapter had its origin in the local fraternity Alpha Nu Omega, formed in 1926) |
| Epsilon Chi | 1952–1954; 1972–2000 | State University of New York at Oswego | Oswego, New York | Inactive | | (Note: Early in 1954, the courts upheld the NY State University System's decision to ban national fraternities. Thus Phi Sigma Epsilon's Chi (Epsilon Chi) and Psi (Epsilon Psi) were placed in inactive status, with Psi never recovering.) (Note: This chapter had its origin in Pi Lambda Tau, a local fraternity that formed in 1949) |
| Epsilon Omega | 1952–1985 | University of Wisconsin–Stout | Menomonie, Wisconsin | Withdrew | | (Note: These four functioning chapters did not participate in the merger between Phi Sigma Kappa and Phi Sigma Epsilon. A total of seven (these four, plus a schismatic group of PSE Lambda chapter alumni who didn't transition into the new Epsilon Lambda, plus two revived chapters) would go on to form Phi Sigma Phi fraternity in 1988. See further discussion on the Talk page.) |
| Phi Alpha | 1952 | | | Memorial | | |
| Phi Beta | 1952–1985 | University of Wisconsin–Eau Claire | Eau Claire, Wisconsin | Withdrew | | (Note: This chapter had its origin in a local fraternity called Phi Beta which formed in 1951 or early 1952.) |
| Phi Delta | 1952–c. 1965 | Black Hills State College | Spearfish, South Dakota | Inactive | | (Note: Originated in 1949 as a local known as Zeta Sigma.) |
| Zeta Tetarton | 1954–1986 | East Tennessee State University | Johnson City, Tennessee | Inactive | | (Note: This chapter had its origin in Mu Epsilon Nu, a local fraternity formed in 1949.) |
| Phi Gamma (see **Chi Tetarton**) | 1956–1980 | Western Michigan University | Kalamazoo, Michigan | Inactive | | (Note: This chapter's combined alumni club is the Chi Tet-PSK Housing Corp.) |
| Phi Epsilon | 1956–2011 | Rider University | Lawrence Township, New Jersey | Inactive | | (Note: Originating in 1949 as The Social Order of the Bearcats, this local fraternity adopted the name Sigma Beta Chi in 1950. This chapter's alumni club is the Rider PSK Alumni Association.) |
| Phi Lambda | 1956–1972 | Parsons College | Fairfield, Iowa | Inactive | | (Note: Originated in 1955 as a local named Lambda Xi Epsilon.) (Note: Parson's College ceased operations in 1973.) |
| Eta Tetarton | 1956–1993; September 2025 | University of Houston | Houston, Texas | Inactive | | (Note: This chapter had its origin in Alpha Delta Psi, a local fraternity formed in 1951.) |
| Theta Tetarton | 1957–1973 | University of Detroit Mercy | Detroit, Michigan | Inactive | | (Note: This chapter had its origin in Zeta Omega, a local formed in 1956.) |
| Iota Tetarton | 1957–1976 | Tufts University | Medford, Massachusetts | Inactive | | (Note: This chapter had its origin in a local fraternity named Theta Delta Theta, formed in 1952.) |
| Kappa Tetarton | 1957–1998; 2003–2020 | Southern Illinois University Carbondale | Carbondale, Illinois | Inactive | | (Note: This chapter had its origin in local fraternity Alpha Sigma Epsilon, formed in 1955. The chapter closed in the spring of 2020 for a minimum of four years for hazing and other risk management violations. Its alumni club is the Kappa Tetarton Alumni Association of PSK.) |
| Lambda Tetarton | 1958–1982 | Wagner College | Staten Island, New York | Inactive | | (Note: This chapter had its origin in the local fraternity Sigma Delta Phi, formed in 1923.) |
| Phi Zeta (see **Alpha Deuteron**) | 1958–1972 | University of Illinois | Champaign, Illinois | Inactive | | (Note: This chapter of Phi Sigma Epsilon was formed through the efforts of transferred members of the fraternity. Its combined alumni club is the PSK Assn of Illinois.) |
| Mu Tetarton | 1958–1983 | Youngstown State University | Youngstown, Ohio | Inactive | | (Note: This chapter had its origin in a local fraternity called Sigma Delta Beta, which formed in 1929.) |
| **Nu Tetarton** | 1959 | Rutgers University | New Brunswick, New Jersey | Active | | (Note: This chapter's alumni club is the Nu Tetarton Alumni Association.) |
| Phi Eta (see Nu Pentaton) | 1959–xxxx ?; 2013–2016 | Clarion University of Pennsylvania | Clarion, Pennsylvania | Inactive | | (Note: California, Edinboro, and Clarion Universities of Pennsylvania merged to become Pennsylvania Western University, "PennWest", with three campuses, on October 14, 2021.) (Note: This chapter had its origin in the Triangles club, formed in 1958. Within a year it became a chapter of Phi Sigma Epsilon. Its alumni club is the Nu Pentaton Area Alumni Association.) |
| Phi Kappa | 1959–1985 | West Virginia Wesleyan College | Buckhannon, West Virginia | Withdrew | | (Note: Twelve years after the PSK/PSE merger, this schismatic chapter finally broke ties with Phi Sigma Phi, a small breakaway group that had formed from a few non-merging chapters, according to their website Archived 2016-02-02 at the Wayback Machine accessed 27 January 2016. They explain that in 1997, 26 active brothers of the Phi Kappa chapter left Phi Sigma Phi and petitioned for a charter to become the Beta Nu chapter of Alpha Sigma Phi (NIC) national fraternity in 1998. At the time, Phi Sigma Phi was not an NIC fraternity. (Phi Sigma Phi joined the NIC soon after; The NIC prohibits such 'poaching' of whole chapters.)) |
| Phi Iota | 1959–1985 | Northland College | Ashland, Wisconsin | Inactive | | (Note: Originated in 1924 as a local named Theta Pi.) |
| Xi Tetarton | 1959–1973 | Michigan State University | East Lansing, Michigan | Inactive | | (Note: Originated as a local group called Kappa Phi which formed in 1958.) (Note: Originated as a local group called Kappa Phi which formed in 1958.) |
| **Phi Theta** | 1958–19xx ?; 1985–2008; 2013 | Shippensburg University of Pennsylvania | Shippensburg, Pennsylvania | Active | | (Note: This chapter's alumni club is the PSK Phi Theta Alumni Association.) |
| Omicron Tetarton | 1959–1979 | Tennessee Wesleyan College | Athens, Tennessee | Inactive | | (Note: This chapter had its origin in local fraternity and campus pioneer Phi Pi Delta, which was formed in 1930. In 1947 it affiliated with Phi Sigma Nu, conjecturally as its Xi chapter, and at the demise of that small national fraternity, in 1958 sought membership in Phi Sigma Kappa. A separate local fraternity on the campus, Alpha Tau, formed in 1957, merged into Phi Sigma Nu shortly before the combined chapter joined ΦΣΚ.) |
| Rho Tetarton | 1959–1972; 19xx?–1989 | Loyola Marymount University | Los Angeles, California | Inactive | | (Note: This chapter had its origin in Sigma Rho, a local fraternity that formed in 1942.) |
| **Pi Tetarton** | 1960–1971; 2014 | LIU Post | Brookville, New York | Active | | (Note: This chapter had its origin in Theta Beta Chi, a local fraternity that was formed in 1957.) |
| Phi Mu | 1960–1985 | Concord University | Athens, West Virginia | Withdrew | | |
| Sigma Chi | 1960–2002 | Shepherd University | Shepherdstown, West Virginia | Inactive | | (Note: Originated from a local chapter named Theta Sigma Chi, which was formed in 1931.) |
| Phi Pi | 1960–1976 | University of Wisconsin–Superior | Superior, Wisconsin | Inactive | | |
| Sigma Tetarton | 1960–1990; 2002–2014 | Midwestern State University | Wichita Falls, Texas | Inactive | | (Note: Originated as a local group called Phi Sigma which formed in 1959.) |
| **Tau Tetarton** | 1960–2016 | University of Tennessee at Martin | Martin, Tennessee | Provisional | | (Note: Chapter had its origin in the local fraternity Alpha Omega Phi, which was formed in 1957. It was inactive during the 2015-2017 biennium (Phi Sigma Kappa report 2015-2017, accessed 29 Nov 2017). It was reformed as a provisional chapter in 2018. Its alumni club is the Tau Tetarton Alumni Club.) |
| Sigma Alpha | 1960–1989 | University of Wisconsin–La Crosse | La Crosse, Wisconsin | Inactive | | (Note: This chapter had its origin in a local fraternity called Alpha Delta Theta, which formed in 1938.) |
| **Upsilon Tetarton** | 1960–2004; 2014 | Rochester Institute of Technology | Rochester, New York | Active | | (Note: Originated from a local chapter called Sigma Theta Gamma which was formed in 1952. Its alumni club is the Sigma Theta Gamma Corp., (Ups Tet), named in honor of their original local.) |
| Phi Tetarton | 1960–1966 | University of the Pacific | Stockton, California | Inactive | | (Note: Origination of this chapter came out of a 102-year-old literary society called Rhizomia, formed in 1858, which later had been named Rho Lambda Phi. Alumni from the group continue to meet annually.) |
| **Chi Tetarton** (see Phi Gamma) | 1961 | Western Michigan University | Kalamazoo, Michigan | Active | | (Note: This chapter's combined alumni club is the Chi Tet-PSK Housing Corp.) |
| Psi Tetarton | 1961–1979 | Waynesburg University | Waynesburg, Pennsylvania | Inactive | | (Note: Originated from a 55-year-old local chapter, Phi Sigma, formed in 1906. Installation into ΦΣΚ was supported by members of ΦΣΚ chapters within Pennsylvania.) |
| Phi Omicron | 1961–1978 | St. Cloud State University | St. Cloud, Minnesota | Inactive | | |
| **Omega Tetarton** | 1962 | California State University, Los Angeles | Los Angeles, California | Active | | (Note: This chapter had its origin in Rho Delta Chi, a local formed in 1949. Its alumni club is the Omega Tetarton Alumni Association.) |
| Phi Nu (see Tau Pentaton) | 1962–1978; 2012–2022 | Mansfield University of Pennsylvania | Mansfield, Pennsylvania | Inactive | | (Note: In July 2021, Pennsylvania higher education officials announced that Mansfield would merge with Bloomsburg University and Lock Haven University in response to financial difficulties and declining enrollment, a consolidation of administrative and other functions, where each institution would represent a campus of a single university. In March 2022, the new institution was created to oversee the three universities and was named the Commonwealth University of Pennsylvania.) (Note: Originated as a local group called the Athenians in 1965. Its combined alumni club is the Phi Nu / Tau Pentaton Alumni Club.) |
| Phi Xi | 1962–1977 | Winona State University | Winona, Minnesota | Inactive | | |
| Alpha Pentaton | 1963–1977 | University of New Mexico | Albuquerque, New Mexico | Inactive | | |
| Phi Tau (see **Gamma**) | 1963–1985 | Cornell University | Ithaca, New York | Inactive | | (Note: Originated in 1951 as the Alpha Beta chapter of Kappa Nu, a small national fraternity that merged with Phi Epsilon Pi in 1961. As both Kappa Nu and an older chapter of Phi Epsilon Pi were present on the Cornell campus, the two groups did not merge, and once released, in 1962, the Kappa Nu chapter sought membership into Phi Sigma Epsilon, becoming its Phi Tau chapter. (Eventually, Phi Epsilon Pi itself became part of Zeta Beta Tau.) 24 years later, this same chapter faced an almost identical situation, when its new national was merged with yet another fraternity, Phi Sigma Kappa, which likewise had an older chapter on the Cornell campus. (This was the only campus where both Phi Sigma Kappa and Phi Sigma Epsilon had active chapters.) Thus in both 1961 and 1985, the group was faced with a merger into another campus group or to disband. They chose to seek membership in Theta Chi, which, according to campus news reports accessed 14 Jun 2017, had in 1983 closed its Lambda chapter on that campus, reviving that chapter. To put a postscript on the matter, the restored Theta Chi at Cornell again closed in 1999, while a brief, 2003 attempt to re-start the chapter was unsuccessful.) (Note: Cornell was the only school with active chapters of both Phi Sigma Kappa and Phi Sigma Epsilon when the two fraternities merged in 1985. Phi Sigma Epsilon's Phi Tau chapter was therefore released to join another national fraternity. It opted to join Theta Chi, but that chapter has since closed. As Theta Chi's alumni held another, larger building the chapter's former building was sold to Alpha Chi Omega sorority. More detail on this may be found in the references.) (Note: The chapter's alumni club is the Gamma Chapter House Association.) |
| Beta Pentaton | 1963–1997; 2003–May 2019 | East Stroudsburg University of Pennsylvania | East Stroudsburg, Pennsylvania | Inactive | | (Note: This chapter had its origin in Phi Sigma, a local chapter formed in 1962. The chapter was closed in May 2019, per national HQ. Its alumni club is the Pocono Mountain Area Alumni Club.) |
| Gamma Pentaton | 1963–1993 | University of Utah | Salt Lake City, Utah | Inactive | | |
| Phi Rho | 1963–1975? | Chadron State College | Chadron, Nebraska | Inactive | | (Note: Originated in 1961 as a local named Omega Chi Epsilon, about a year before induction into Phi Sigma Epsilon. Not to be confused with the Chemical Engineering honors society of the same name.) |
| Delta Pentaton | 1963–1992 | Northeastern University | Boston, Massachusetts | Inactive | | (Note: Originated from a 39-year-old local chapter, Sigma Phi Alpha, established in 1924. Merger was supported by members of ΦΣΚ chapters in the Northeast.) |
| **Phi Upsilon** | 1964 | Valparaiso University | Valparaiso, Indiana | Active | | (Note: This chapter's alumni club is the Phi Upsilon Alumni Chapter, Inc.) |
| Epsilon Pentaton | 1963–1969 | American International College | Springfield, Massachusetts | Inactive | | (Note: This chapter had its origin in 1938 in Phi Delta Mu, a local fraternity.) |
| Zeta Pentaton | 1964–2013 | University of Texas–Pan American | Edinburg, Texas | Inactive | | |
| Eta Pentaton | 1965–1982 | Drexel University | Philadelphia, Pennsylvania | Inactive | | (Note: This chapter had its origin in Delta Kappa Rho, a local formed in 1950.) |
| **Theta Pentaton** | 1965–1995; 2015 | Indiana University of Pennsylvania | Indiana, Pennsylvania | Active | | (Note: This chapter had its origin in Sigma Kappa Phi, a local formed in 1963. Re-Chartered April 22–23, 2016, per national newsletter, the Sig-Net, April 2016 issue. Its alumni club is the Indiana Area Alumni Club.) |
| Phi Sigma | 1965–1990 | Hillsdale College | Hillsdale, Michigan | Inactive | | |
| Phi Phi | 1965–1976 | University of Wisconsin–Oshkosh | Oshkosh, Wisconsin | Inactive | | (Note: Originated in 1925 as a local named the Periclean Club. UW Oshkosh closed most Greek Letter organizations between 1976 and 1979 for risk management issues.) |
| Iota Pentaton | 1966–2020 | California State University, Fullerton | Fullerton, California | Inactive | | (Note: This chapter had its origin in Delta Tau Upsilon, a local formed in 1961. The chapter was suspended in the wake of the finding of a racially offensive watermark at the bottom of a chapter publication in 2019, as noted in a 9 Feb 2020 article in the OC Register. Accessed 9 Oct 2021.) |
| Kappa Pentaton | 1966–1997; 2004–2015; September 2026 | University of California, Santa Barbara | Santa Barbara, California | Provisional | | (Note: This chapter's alumni club is the Kappa Pentaton Alumni Association.) |
| Lambda Pentaton (see **Sigma Epsilon)** | 1966–1977; 1985 | Ferris State University | Big Rapids, Michigan | Active | | (Note: This chapter's alumni club is the Phi Sig Alumni Assn of FSU.) (Note: Both Phi Sigma Kappa and Phi Sigma Epsilon had chapters at Ferris State University. The Phi Sigma Kappa chapter closed in 1978. Phi Sigma Epsilon's Sigma Epsilon chapter became the Sigma Epsilon chapter of Phi Sigma Kappa when the two fraternities merged.) |
| Mu Pentaton (see **Epsilon Phi**) | 1966 | University of Wisconsin–Milwaukee | Milwaukee, Wisconsin | Active | | (Note: This chapter's combined alumni club is the PSK-Epsilon Phi Alumni Club.) |
| Nu Pentaton (see Phi Eta) | 1967–2008; 2013–2016 | Clarion University of Pennsylvania | Clarion, Pennsylvania | Inactive | | (Note: California, Edinboro, and Clarion Universities of Pennsylvania merged to become Pennsylvania Western University, "PennWest", with three campuses, on October 14, 2021) (Note: The chapter had its origin in the Triangles club, formed in 1958. Its alumni club is the Nu Pentaton Area Alumni Association.) |
| **Xi Pentaton** | 1967–1972; 1992–2010; 202x ? | California State University, Northridge | Los Angeles, California | Provisional | | (Note: Originated from "a particularly close-knit local," Sigma Phi Beta formed in 1962. The ~1970 closure was due to counterculture unrest that year. Chapter reformed as a provisional chapter in 2019.) |
| Sigma Beta | 1967–1995 | Missouri State University | Springfield, Missouri | Inactive | | |
| Omicron Pentaton | 1967–1976; 1978–1987 | Edinboro University of Pennsylvania | Edinboro, Pennsylvania | Inactive | | (Note: This chapter had its origin in Phi Sigma Pi, a local fraternity formed in 1957.) |
| **Pi Pentaton** (see Epsilon Sigma) | 1967 | Northern Illinois University | DeKalb, Illinois | Active | | (Note: This chapter was formed from Sigma Delta Phi, a local fraternity established in 1965. Its alumni club is the PSK Alumni Association of Northern IL.) |
| Rho Pentaton | 1967–1976 | Northwestern University | Evanston, Illinois | Inactive | | (Note: This chapter had its origin in Delta Sigma Pi, a local fraternity formed in 1920.) |
| Sigma Pentaton | 1968–1976 | Quinnipiac College | Hamden, Connecticut | Inactive | | (Note: This chapter had its origin in a local fraternity named Sigma Delta Chi, formed in 1966.) |
| Sigma Delta | 1968–1994 | St. Norbert College | De Pere, Wisconsin | Inactive | | |
| Tau Pentaton (see Phi Nu) | 1968–1985; 2012–2022 | Mansfield University | Mansfield, Pennsylvania | Inactive | | (Note: In July 2021, Pennsylvania higher education officials announced that Mansfield would merge with Bloomsburg University and Lock Haven University in response to financial difficulties and declining enrollment, a consolidation of administrative and other functions, where each institution would represent a campus of a single university. In March 2022, the new institution was created to oversee the three universities and was named the Commonwealth University of Pennsylvania) (Note: This chapter's combined alumni club is the Phi Nu / Tau Pentaton Alumni Club.) |
| Sigma Zeta | 1968–19xx ?; 1985–1985; 1994–2005 | University of Wisconsin–River Falls | River Falls, Wisconsin | Inactive | | (Note: The Sigma Zeta chapter of Phi Sigma Epsilon did not participate in the merger with Phi Sigma Kappa. It eventually became a chapter of Phi Sigma Phi but, dissatisfied, was then re-established as a colony of Phi Sigma Kappa in 1996.) (Note: This chapter had its origin in a local fraternity called Kappa Theta, which formed in 1962.) |
| Phi Pentaton | 1968–1978; 1988–1995 | University of Arizona | Tucson, Arizona | Inactive | | |
| **Sigma Epsilon** (see Lambda Pentaton) | 1968 | Ferris State University | Big Rapids, Michigan | Active | | (Note: Both Phi Sigma Kappa and Phi Sigma Epsilon had chapters at Ferris State University. The Phi Sigma Kappa chapter closed in 1978. Phi Sigma Epsilon's Sigma Epsilon chapter became the Sigma Epsilon chapter of Phi Sigma Kappa when the two fraternities merged.) (Note: This chapter's alumni club is the Phi Sig Alumni Assn of FSU.) |
| Chi Pentaton (see **Epsilon Lambda**) | 1968 | Eastern Michigan University | Ypsilanti, Michigan | Inactive | | (Note: This chapter originated as Alpha Beta Sigma, a local fraternity formed in 1963. Its combined alumni club is the Epsilon Lambda Alumni chapter.) |
| Sigma Gamma | 1969–1977 ? | Wayne State College | Wayne, Nebraska | Inactive | | |
| Sigma Eta | 1969–1998 | Southeast Missouri State University | Cape Girardeau, Missouri | Inactive | | |
| Sigma Kappa (see Zeta Hexaton) | 1969–1976 | La Salle University | Philadelphia, Pennsylvania | Inactive | | (Note: This chapter had its origin in Beta Alpha Lambda, a local fraternity that formed in 1963.) |
| Upsilon Pentaton | 1969–1972 | University of Hartford | West Hartford, Connecticut | Inactive | | (Note: This chapter had its origin in Epsilon Xi, a local fraternity formed in 1954.) |
| Sigma Iota | 1969–1991 | University of Wisconsin–Platteville | Platteville, Wisconsin | Inactive | | (Note: The University of Wisconsin–Platteville chapter began as the Philadelphian Society in 1866, the year this school was founded. Sometime after 1893, they adopted the name Phi Sigma, continuing as a local fraternity. The group merged into Phi Sigma Epsilon in 1969, then followed that fraternity's merger with Phi Sigma Kappa in 1985. It withdrew or closed in 1991, possibly becoming dormant for a time. However, the group, now unaffiliated with Phi Sigma Kappa, has emerged with local alumni support as a local under its old name, Phi Sigma. Website accessed 16 Feb 2020. Name similarity to PSK's Phi Sigma chapter, at Hillsdale College is merely coincidental.) (Note: Chapter's predecessor was a local fraternity, coincidentally named "Phi Sigma," as "The Philadelphian Society" in 1866. It once again re-established as a local.) |
| Psi Pentaton | 1969–2001 | University of Memphis | Memphis, Tennessee | Inactive | | (Note: This chapter's alumni club is the Psi Pentaton/Memphis Area PSK Club.) |
| Sigma Theta | 1969–1972 | Hofstra University | Hempstead, New York | Inactive | | |
| Sigma Lambda colony | NA | University of Minnesota Morris | Morris, Minnesota | Inactive | | (Note: Colony was formed from Xi Omega, a local fraternity established in 1967. It was a colony from 1969 to around 1972 but was never chartered.) |
| Sigma Mu colony | 1969–1972 ? | Manhattan College | Bronx, New York City, New York | Inactive | | |
| Omega Pentaton | 1970–1973 | Bethel University | McKenzie, Tennessee | Inactive | | (Note: Originated from a local chapter, Kappa Phi Sigma, which reverted to local status before closing during 1973-era student unrest.) |
| Sigma Nu | 1970–1998 | Slippery Rock University | Slippery Rock, Pennsylvania | Inactive | | |
| Phi Omega | 1970–2005 | Minnesota State University Moorhead | Moorhead, Minnesota | Inactive | | (Note: Originated as a local chapter, Xi Omega, established in 1967.) |
| Sigma Xi | 1970–1975 | Bloomsburg University of Pennsylvania | Bloomsburg, Pennsylvania | Inactive | | (Note: In July 2021, Pennsylvania higher education officials announced that Mansfield would merge with Bloomsburg University and Lock Haven University in response to financial difficulties and declining enrollment, a consolidation of administrative and other functions, where each institution would represent a campus of a single university. In March 2022, the new institution was created to oversee the three universities and was named the Commonwealth University of Pennsylvania.) (Note: Originated in 1967 as a local chapter, unnamed.) |
| Phi Chi | 1970–1976 | Bemidji State University | Bemidji, Minnesota | Inactive | | |
| Phi Psi | 1970–1975 | University of St. Thomas | Saint Paul, Minnesota | Inactive | | |
| Alpha Hexaton | 1971–1975 | Salem College | Salem, West Virginia | Inactive | | (Note: Chapter formed from a local fraternity Phi Sigma Chi, established in 1968.) |
| Beta Hexaton | 1971–1992 | Purdue University Calumet | Hammond, Indiana | Inactive | | (Note: This chapter had its origin in a local fraternity called Sigma Beta Chi which formed in 1969. Unrelated to the Rider University local society of the same name.) |
| **Gamma Hexaton** | 1971–1977; 1986 | Robert Morris University | Moon Township, Pennsylvania | Active | | (Note: This chapter originated as the local fraternity Sigma Beta Mu, established in 1960. The chapter's alumni club is the Gamma Hexaton Alumni Association.) |
| Delta Hexaton | 1971–2006 | Susquehanna University | Selinsgrove, Pennsylvania | Inactive | | (Note: This chapter had its origin in the local fraternity Beta Rho Epsilon, which was formed in 1965.) |
| Sigma Omicron | NA | | | Unassigned | | |
| Sigma Pi | NA | | | Unassigned | | |
| Sigma Rho | NA | | | Unassigned | | |
| Sigma Sigma | NA | | | Unassigned | | |
| Sigma Tau | 1971–1976; 1980–1985; 1985–2015 | Missouri Western State University | St. Joseph, Missouri | Inactive | | (Note: Chapter formed from Sigma Tau, a local fraternity established in 1969.) |
| **Epsilon Hexaton** | 1972–2001; 2007 | Virginia Tech | Blacksburg, Virginia | Active | | (Note: This chapter formed from the local fraternity Alpha Kappa Epsilon, established in 1961. Its alumni club is the Epsilon Hexaton Alumni Foundation.) |
| Zeta Hexaton (see Sigma Kappa) | 1972–1978 | La Salle University | Philadelphia, Pennsylvania | Inactive | | |
| **Eta Hexaton** | 1963–1997; 2001 | University of Dayton | Dayton, Ohio | Active | | (Note: This chapter formed from Delta Chi Delta, a local fraternity established in 1963. Its alumni club is the PSK Alumni Club of Dayton.) |
| Theta Hexaton | 1973–1986 | Nicholls State University | Thibodaux, Louisiana | Inactive | | |
| Iota Hexaton | 1973–1994 | Fairleigh Dickinson University Metropolitan Campus | Teaneck, New Jersey | Inactive | | (Note: Chapter formed from Alpha Pi Chi, a local fraternity established in 1970. Iota Hexaton lost recognition on campus in 1994, but may have lingered sub rosa, without a legal relationship with Phi Sigma Kappa. The last likely graduation dates for former members were c. 1998 to 2000.) |
| **Kappa Hexaton** | 1974 | Stetson University | DeLand, Florida | Active | | (Note: Chapter formed from the local fraternity Delta Rho, established in 1972. Kappa Its alumni club is the Kappa Hexaton Alumni.) |
| Lambda Hexaton | 1976–1987 | Saint Joseph's University | Philadelphia, Pennsylvania | Inactive | | |
| **Mu Hexaton** | 1976–2001; 2007 | Radford University | Radford, Virginia | Active | | (Note: The chapter's alumni club is the Mu Hexaton Alumni Foundation, Inc.) |
| Nu Hexaton | 1976–1977 | West Liberty University | West Liberty, West Virginia | Inactive | | |
| Xi Hexaton | 1976–1990s | Clinch Valley College of the University of Virginia | Wise, Virginia | Inactive | | (Note: This was the pioneer fraternity on the campus. It was colonized in 1975.) |
| Omicron Hexaton | 1977–1983 | Oregon Institute of Technology | Klamath Falls, Oregon | Inactive | | |
| Pi Hexaton | 1979–1995 | Occidental College | Los Angeles, California | Inactive | | (Note: Chapter formed from Sigma Omicron, a local fraternity that formed in 1919 before becoming a chapter of Kappa Sigma in 1933, and then reverting to local status in 1963. In 1976, it reached out to join ΦΣΚ, with the support of nearby chapters. The ΚΣ chapter formed on that campus in 1966 is not connected with this earlier group.) |
| **Rho Hexaton** | 1981 | Northern Arizona University | Flagstaff, Arizona | Active | | |
| Sigma Hexaton | 1982–2005 | Illinois State University | Normal, Illinois | Inactive | | |
| Tau Hexaton | 1983–2010 | Monmouth University | West Long Branch, New Jersey | Inactive | | |
| Upsilon Hexaton | 1984–2022 | Fairleigh Dickinson University Florham Campus | Madison, New Jersey | Inactive | | |
| **Phi Hexaton** | 1985 | Towson University | Towson, Maryland | Active | | |
| Sigma Upsilon | NA | | | Unassigned | | |
| Sigma Phi | NA | | | Unassigned | | |
| Sigma Psi colony | NA | University of Minnesota Duluth | Duluth, Minnesota | Inactive | | (Note: Was a colony from 1985–1988 but was never chartered.) |
| Sigma Omega | NA | | | Unassigned | | |
| Chi Hexaton | 1988–1992? | Virginia Commonwealth University | Richmond, Virginia | Inactive | | |
| Psi Hexaton | 1989–1996 | McGill University | Montreal, Quebec, Canada | Inactive | | |
| Omega Hexaton | 1989–2002 | University of California, Irvine | Irvine, California | Inactive | | |
| Alpha Septaton | 1990–2007 | University of Pittsburgh | Pittsburgh, Pennsylvania | Inactive | | |
| Beta Septaton | 1990–2017 | Florida State University | Tallahassee, Florida | Inactive | | (Note: The chapter's alumni club is the Beta Septaton Alumni Association.) (Note: The chapter's alumni club is the Beta Septaton Alumni Association.) |
| Gamma Septaton | 1990–2002 | Bowling Green State University | Bowling Green, Ohio | Inactive | | |
| Delta Septaton | 1990–1994 | University of Wisconsin–Green Bay | Green Bay, Wisconsin | Inactive | | |
| Epsilon Septaton | 1990–1995 | Frostburg State University | Frostburg, Maryland | Inactive | | (Note: The Epsilon Septaton chapter of Phi Sigma Kappa reverted to its previous local affiliation of Delta Beta Chi in 1995. Kappa Septaton chapter likewise ended its affiliation with Phi Sigma Kappa in 2007 to become the Beta chapter of Delta Beta Chi. Both local chapters are now dormant. This two-chapter group is not to be confused with the small national sorority of the same name) (Note: Chapter formed from Delta Beta Chi, a local fraternity established in 1981. Later, it reverted to local status and failed soon thereafter.) |
| Zeta Septaton | 1990–2002; 2010–2011 | Johnson & Wales University | Providence, Rhode Island | Inactive | | (Note: Chapter formed from Chi Lambda Sigma, a local fraternity dating to 1989 or earlier.) |
| **Eta Septaton** | 1991 | California Polytechnic State University, San Luis Obispo | San Luis Obispo, California | Active | | (Note: The chapter's alumni club is the Eta Septaton Alumni Club of PSK.) |
| Theta Septaton | 1992–1995 | Marist College | Poughkeepsie, New York | Inactive | | |
| Iota Septaton | 1992–2014 | Penn State Altoona | Logan Township, Pennsylvania | Inactive | | (Note: An active Penn State-Altoona member committed suicide while home on spring break in early 2014; allegations that he had earlier been hazed were investigated, and the chapter was placed under suspension and is currently closed.) |
| Kappa Septaton | 1992–2006 | State University College at Buffalo | Buffalo, New York | Inactive | | (Note: Chapter reverted to local status as Delta Beta Chi and failed soon thereafter.) |
| Lambda Septaton | 1994–2014 | Florida International University | University Park, Florida | Inactive | | |
| Mu Septaton | 1995–2014 | University of Delaware | Newark, Delaware | Inactive | | (Note: Chapter was suspended but is now eligible to return, having fulfilled the university's term of suspension. Its alumni club is the Mu Septaton Alumni Club.) |
| Nu Septaton | 1995–2014 | Marian University | Fond du Lac, Wisconsin | Inactive | | (Note: The chapter's alumni club is the PSK-Nu Septaton Alumni Club.) |
| **Xi Septaton** | 1995 | George Mason University | Fairfax, Virginia | Active | | (Note: The chapter's alumni club is the Xi Septaton Alumni Association.) |
| **Omicron Septaton** | 1996 | Villanova University | Villanova, Pennsylvania | Active | | |
| Pi Septaton | 1996–1999 | Texas A&M University | College Station, Texas | Inactive | | |
| Rho Septaton | 1999–2007 | Texas State University | San Marcos, Texas | Inactive | | |
| Sigma Septaton | 2000–2003 | Delaware Valley University | Doylestown, Pennsylvania | Inactive | | (Note: Chapter formed from Delta Phi Theta, a local fraternity.) |
| **Tau Septaton** | 2003 | Hope College | Holland, Michigan | Active | | (Note: The chapter's alumni club is the Tau Septaton Alumni Association.) |
| **Upsilon Septaton** | 2003 | Clemson University | Clemson, South Carolina | Active | | |
| **Phi Septaton** | 2006 | Adelphi University | Garden City, New York | Active | | |
| **Chi Septaton** | 2008–2010; April 1, 2016 | Georgia Southern University | Statesboro, Georgia | Active | | |
| **Psi Septaton** | 2010 | Valdosta State University | Valdosta, Georgia | Active | | (Note: The chapter's alumni club is the Psi Septaton Alumni Club.) |
| **Omega Septaton** | 2010 | Auburn University | Auburn, Alabama | Active | | |
| **Alpha Octaton** | 2012 | New Jersey Institute of Technology | Newark, New Jersey | Active | | |
| Beta Octaton | September 20, 2014–2017 | University of North Carolina at Charlotte | Charlotte, North Carolina | Inactive | | (Note: Chapter was suspended for hazing.) |
| **Gamma Octaton** | 2015 | Young Harris College | Young Harris, Georgia | Active | | |
| **Delta Octaton** | 2017 | Appalachian State University | Boone, North Carolina | Active | | |
| **Epsilon Octaton** | 2017 | University of Cincinnati | Cincinnati, Ohio | Active | | |
| **Texas Tech Provisional** | | Texas Tech University | Lubbock, Texas | Provisional | | (Note: Provisional chapter formed in 2020.) |
