= Shaw Hall =

- Shaw Hall, West Liberty State College
- U.S. National Register of Historic Places
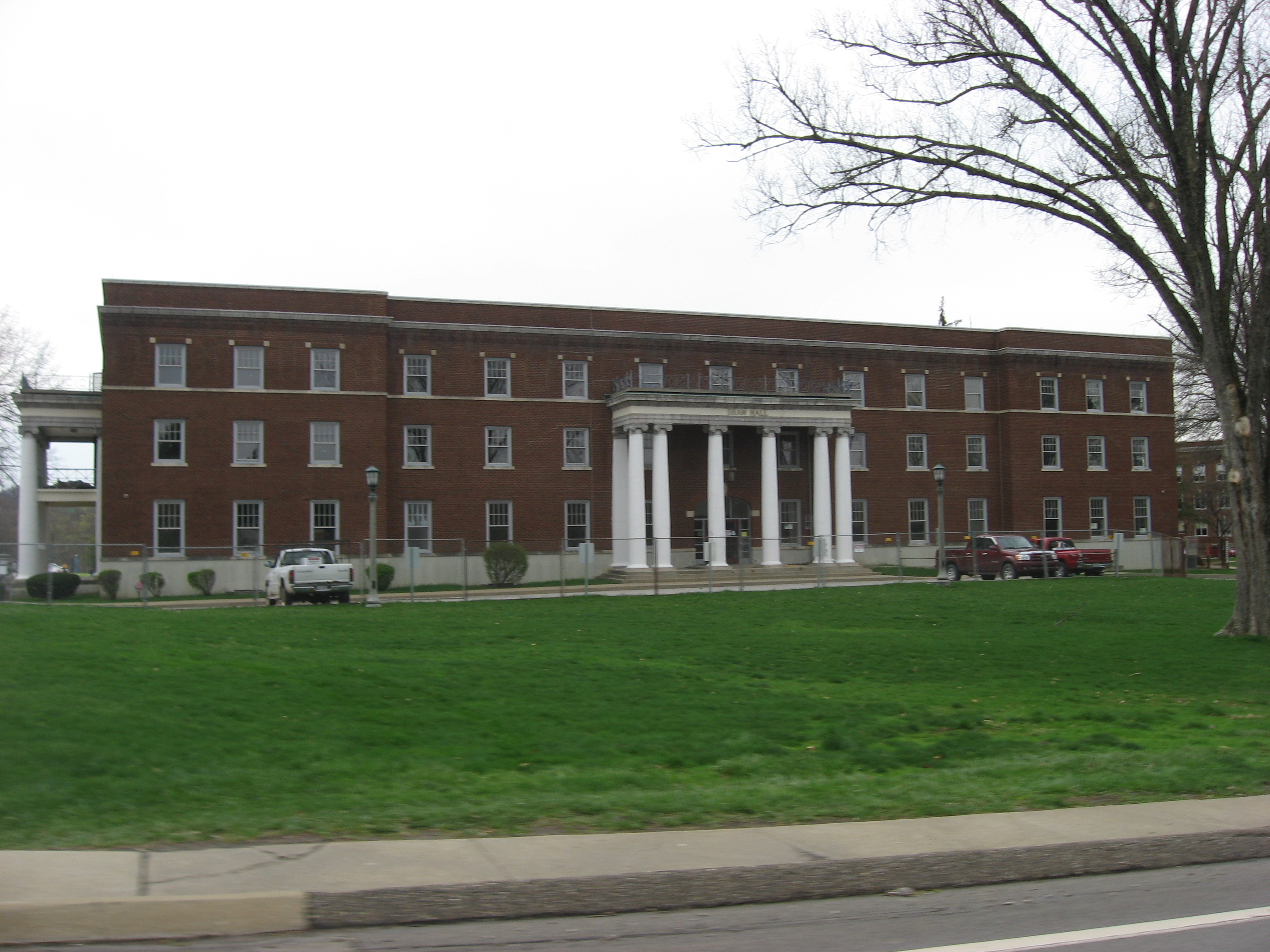
- Shaw Hall, April 2011

- Location within West Virginia Location within the United States
- Location: Bethany Pike, approximately 1.25 mi. S of jct. with Locust Grove Rd., West Liberty, West Virginia
- Coordinates: 40°09′57″N 80°36′06″W
- Area: less than one acre
- Built: 1919
- Architectural style: Classical Revival
- NRHP reference No.: 96001528
- Added to NRHP: December 27, 1996

Shaw Hall is a historic dormitory located on the campus of West Liberty University at West Liberty, Ohio County, West Virginia. It was built in 1919–1920, and is a three-story red brick building in the Classical Revival style. The front and end facades are dominated by two-story porticos with Ionic order columns having a stucco shaft. It was built as the first dormitory on campus and housed female students. It is the oldest building on the campus of West Liberty University. The building now houses classrooms and administrative offices. The building is named for John C. Shaw, president of West Liberty Normal School from 1908 to 1919.

It was listed on the National Register of Historic Places in 1996.

== See also ==
- University and college buildings listed on the National Register of Historic Places
