= Attorney General Allen =

Attorney General Allen may refer to:

- Charles Allen (jurist) (1827–1913), Attorney General of Massachusetts
- Ebenezer Allen (Texas politician) (1804–1863), Attorney General of Texas
- John Campbell Allen (1817–1898), Attorney General of New Brunswick
- J. Weston Allen (1872–1942), Attorney General of Massachusetts

== See also ==
- John Allan (Australian politician) (1866–1936), Attorney-General of Victoria
- William Allain (1928–2013), Attorney General of Mississippi
- General Allen (disambiguation)
