= John R. Allen Jr. =

US Air Force general

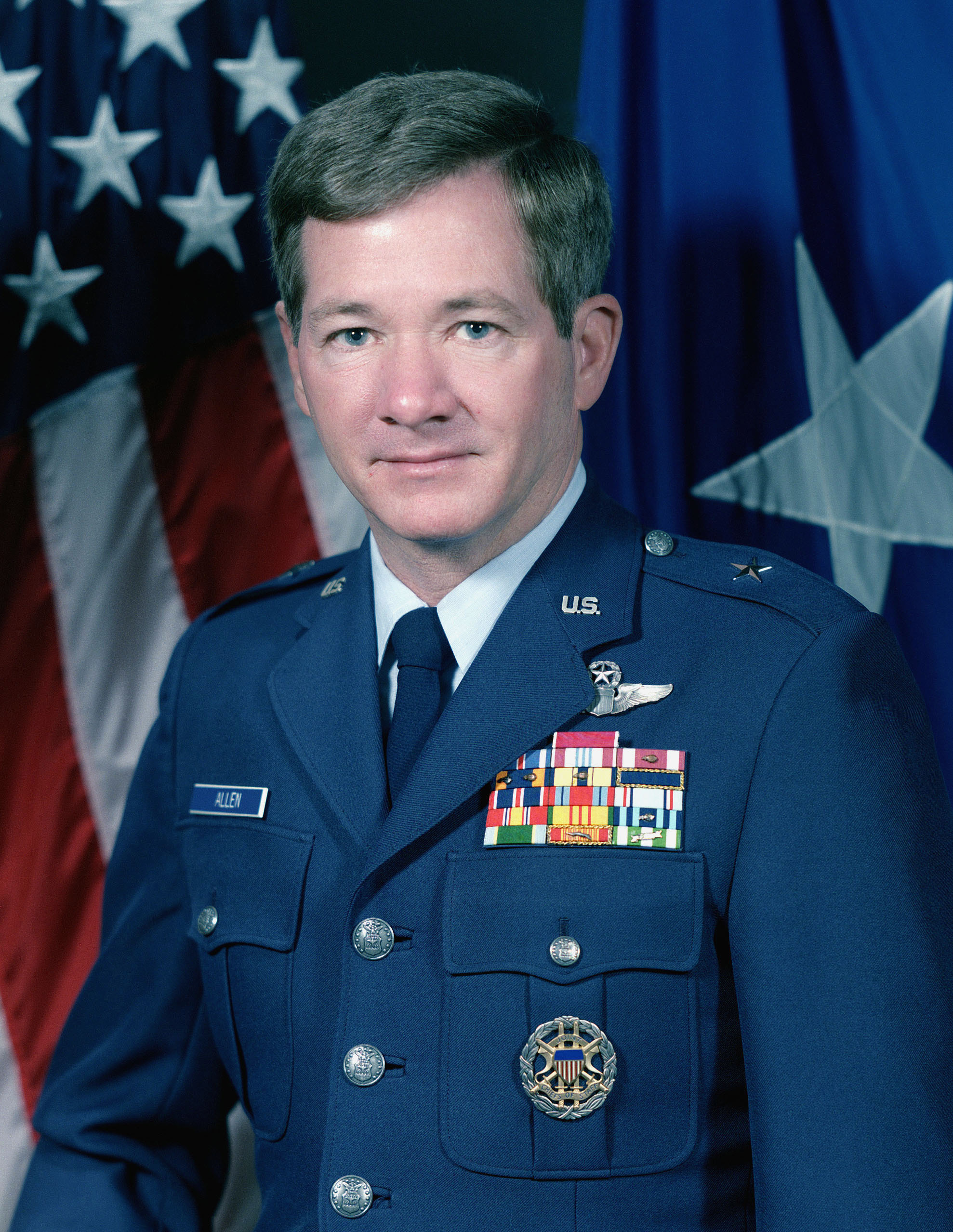
- Brig. Gen. Allen in 1986
- Born: 1935 (age 90–91); Louisville, Kentucky, U.S.
- Military career
- Allegiance: United States of America
- Branch: United States Air Force
- Service years: 1959–1990
- Rank: Brigadier general
- Commands: 46th Bombardment Squadron; 92nd Bombardment Wing; 45th Air Division
- Conflicts: Vietnam War
- Awards: Defense Superior Service Medal; Legion of Merit; Distinguished Flying Cross
- Other work: National Association of Installation Developers

John R. Allen Jr. (born 1935) is a retired United States Air Force (USAF) brigadier general. Allen served on active duty for 31 years, until his retirement in 1990. He is a highly decorated command pilot with over 6,000 flying hours on B-47 Stratojet, FB-111, B-52 Stratofortress, KC-135 Stratotanker and T-39 Sabreliner aircraft.

== Biography ==
=== Early years and education ===
John R. Allen Jr. was born in Louisville, Kentucky, in 1935. He graduated from high school in Spartanburg, South Carolina, in 1954. He received a Bachelor of Arts degree from the University of Nebraska–Lincoln in 1975 and a Master of Arts degree in Management and Supervision from Central Michigan University in 1979. He completed Squadron Officer School in 1966, Industrial College of the Armed Forces in 1980 and the program for senior officials in national security at the John F. Kennedy School of Government, Harvard University, in 1985.

== Career ==
=== Military career ===
Allen was commissioned in December 1959 and assigned to Little Rock Air Force Base, Arkansas, as a B-47 co-pilot. In June 1964, he transferred to the 393rd Bombardment Squadron, Pease AFB, New Hampshire, as a B-47 commander. In April 1966, he entered B-52 training and upon completion was assigned to the 20th Bombardment Squadron, Carswell AFB, Texas, as a B-52 commander, later serving as chief of the Standardization Division. Between 1969 and 1971, he flew 150 B-52 combat missions in the Vietnam War during three temporary duty tours in Southeast Asia and served as chief of the Tactical Evaluation Division, 8th Air Force, Andersen AFB, Guam. Allen then served as the Arc Light liaison officer at USAF Headquarters, Washington, D.C., from April through September 1972.

Allen was an air operations staff officer at Headquarters Strategic Air Command (SAC), Offutt AFB, Nebraska, until March 1974. His varied duties included the certification of U.S. Navy sea mines for use on B-52D's and feasibility tests of B-52 high-altitude laser-guided bomb delivery. He then became chief of the Aircraft and Weapons Test Branch and, later, executive officer to the deputy chief of staff for operations, also at SAC headquarters.

Allen assumed command of the 46th Bombardment Squadron, Grand Forks AFB, North Dakota, in February 1977. He was assigned to the Air Staff at USAF Headquarters in August 1978 as one of two action officers who presented Air Force positions regarding the Strategic Arms Limitation Talks to the Joint Staff. After completing the Industrial College of the Armed Forces in June 1980, Allen was assigned as chief of the Nuclear Contingency Branch, Strategic Operations Division, Directorate of Operations, Organization of the Joint Chiefs of Staff, Washington, D.C.

He transferred to the 92nd Bombardment Wing, Fairchild AFB, Washington, as vice commander in January 1982 and in August 1982 assumed command of the wing. In addition to his accomplishments while wing commander, he developed Fairchild's Year 2000 Plan, a far-reaching plan to replace many old buildings and modernize the base.

In September 1984, Allen was assigned as the senior military adviser to the director, U.S. Arms Control and Disarmament Agency, Washington, D.C., where he provided high-level liaison with the Office of the Secretary of Defense and the Joint Chiefs of Staff in policy formulation, arms control negotiations and agency operations.

In June 1986, he was assigned as commander of SAC's 45th Air Division, consisting of FB-111s at Pease AFB and Plattsburgh AFB, New York; and B-52G's at Loring AFB, Maine.

In September 1987, Allen became vice commander, Sacramento Air Logistics Center, Air Force Logistics Command, McClellan AFB, California.

In August 1989, he became the vice commander of Oklahoma City Air Logistics Center, Air Force Logistics Command, Tinker AFB, Oklahoma. He retired after 31 years of service on October 1, 1990.

=== Military awards and decorations ===
Allen's military decorations and awards include the Defense Superior Service Medal, Legion of Merit, Distinguished Flying Cross, Defense Meritorious Service Medal, Meritorious Service Medal with oak leaf cluster, Air Medal with six oak leaf clusters, Air Force Commendation Medal with oak leaf cluster and Combat Readiness Medal.

- Defense Superior Service Medal
- Legion of Merit
- Distinguished Flying Cross
- Defense Meritorious Service Medal
- Meritorious Service Medal with oak leaf cluster
- Air Medal with six oak leaf clusters
- Air Force Commendation Medal with oak leaf cluster
- Combat Readiness Medal

=== Post-military career ===
After retiring from the U.S. Air Force, brigadier general Allen became the first executive director of the National Association of Installation Developers, which assists communities through the effects of the closure of a military base in their area.
