= West Liberty University =

Public university in West Liberty, West Virginia, US

Coordinates: 40°9′48″N 80°36′8″W

- Former names: West Liberty Academy (1837–1870); West Liberty State Normal School (1870–1931); West Liberty State Teachers College (1931–1943); West Liberty State College (1943–2009)
- Type: Public university
- Established: March 30, 1837 (189 years ago)
- Accreditation: HLC
- Academic affiliations: WVHEPC
- Endowment: $20.3 million (2021)
- President: Tim Borchers
- Academic staff: 143
- Students: 2,505 (fall 2022)
- Undergraduates: 1,919
- Postgraduates: 396
- Location: West Liberty, West Virginia, United States
- Campus: 290 acres (1.2 km^{2}); Fringe rural
- Other campuses: Triadelphia
- Newspaper: The Trumpet
- Colors: Black and gold
- Nickname: Hilltoppers
- Sporting affiliations: NCAA Division II - MEC
- Mascot: Topper the Bear
- Website: westliberty.edu

West Liberty University (WLU) is a public university in West Liberty, West Virginia, United States. Located in the state's Northern Panhandle, it was established as an academy in 1837 and is the oldest university in West Virginia. It offers more than 70 undergraduate majors and graduate programs and had an enrollment of approximately 2,500 students in 2022.

WLU's athletic teams, known as the West Liberty Hilltoppers, are charter members of the NCAA Division II Mountain East Conference with nearly 400 student-athletes participating in 16 intercollegiate sports, including football, basketball, wrestling, track, acrobatics & tumbling and baseball.

== History ==
What is now West Liberty University was established as West Liberty Academy on March 30, 1837, before the state broke away from Virginia during the American Civil War. Under the guidance of Reverend Nathan Shotwell, it was created to respond to the need for higher educational opportunities west of the Appalachian ridge. The institution was originally a normal school and was named after the town in which it is located. West Liberty was so named in the late 18th century as the westernmost point of the new liberty proclaimed by the U.S. Declaration of Independence.

Under the direction of Paul N. Elbin, the youngest president of a four-year college in the U.S. at age 30, the West Liberty Academy transitioned to West Liberty State Teachers College and eventually West Liberty State College. Under Elbin's 35-year leadership, the college developed a full curriculum, faculty, staff, student services, and activities including music and theatre.

West Liberty was approved to become a university by the West Virginia Higher Education Policy Commission in November 2008. The West Liberty Board of Governors voted to change to West Liberty University on May 3, 2009. The bulk of its student body comes from the Northern Panhandle of West Virginia, eastern Ohio, and western Pennsylvania.

Tim Borchers was appointed as the university's 38th president on May 12, 2023, by the West Liberty University Board of Governors. He assumed his role on July 1, 2023.

=== Presidents ===
Presidents of the institution have included:

- Nathan Shotwell, 1838-1854
- A. F. Ross, 1857-1861
- James Tyler Bradbury, 1862-1863
- John Allen Brown, 1864-1867
- John Creighton Frazier, 1867-1870
- F. H. Crago, 1870-1873
- James E. Morrow, 1873-1875
- J. Clinton Gwynne, 1875-1879
- Robert McPheeters, 1879-1881
- Daniel T. Williams, 1881-1884
- J. A. Cox, 1884-1886
- Robert Allen Armstrong, 1886-1893
- J. N. Deahl, 1893-1898
- W. B. Cutright, 1898-1899
- J. M. Skinner, 1899-1901
- W. L. McCowan, 1901-1903
- Lorain Fortney, 1903-1908
- John C. Shaw, 1908-1919
- Clinton T. Bogus (acting), 1919-1920
- Howard J. McGinnis, 1920-1925
- Earl C. Bowman (acting), 1925-1926
- John S. Bonar, 1926-1933
- John C. Shreve, 1933-1935
- Paul N. Elbin, 1935-1970
- James L. Chapman, 1970-1984
- Lawrence H. Talley (interim), 1984
- Clyde D. Campbell, 1984-1995
- Donald C. Darnton (interim), 1995-1996
- Ronald M. Zaccari, 1996-2001
- John P. McCullough (interim), 2001
- Richard H. Owens, 2002-2005
- John P. McCullough (interim), 2005-2007
- Robin C. Capehart, 2007-2015
- John P. McCullough (interim), 2015
- Stephen G. Greiner, 2016-2020
- W. Franklin Evans, 2021-2022
- Cathy Monteroso (interim), 2023
- Timothy A. Borchers, 2023-present

== Campus ==
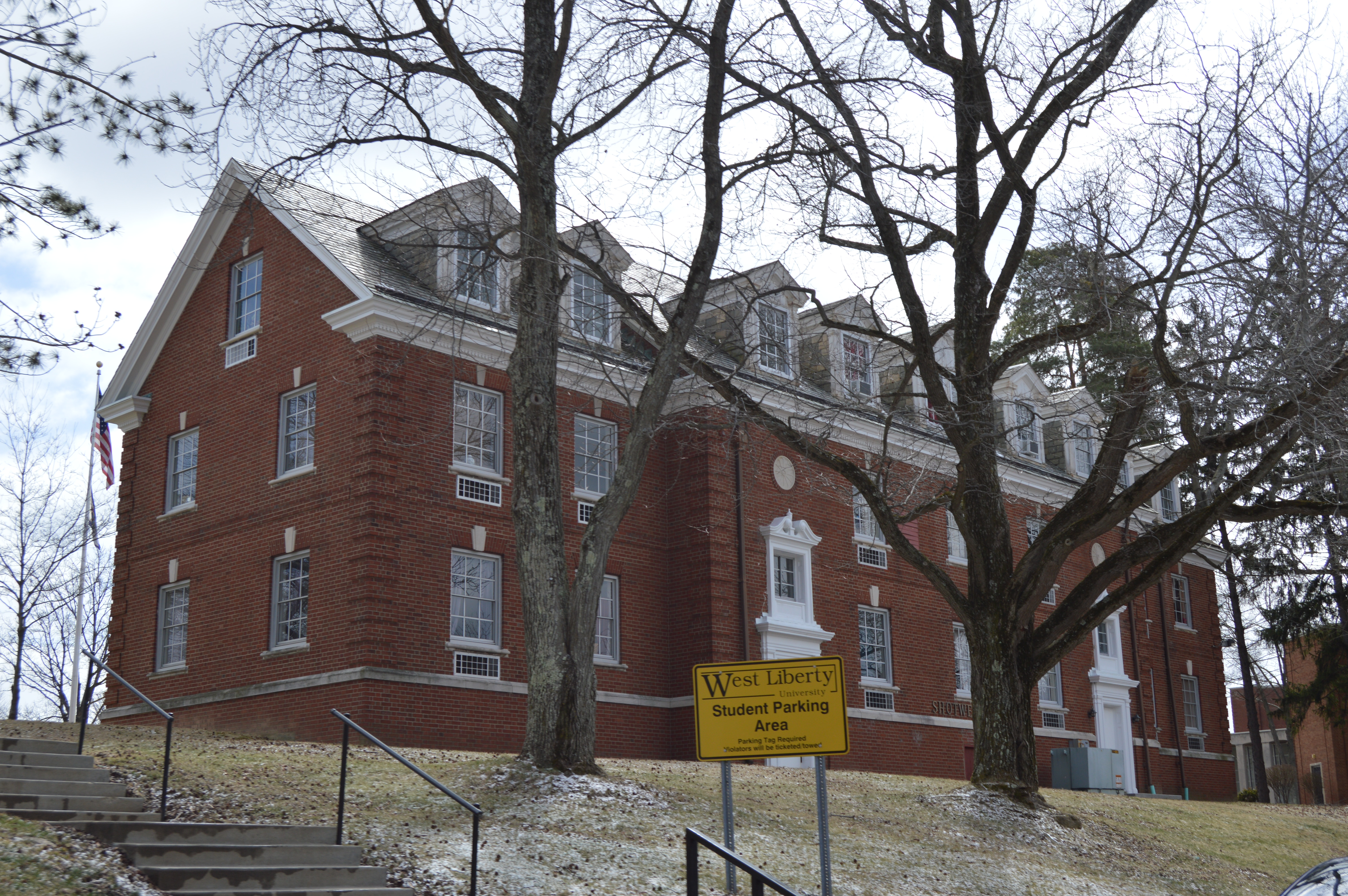
Shotwell Hall

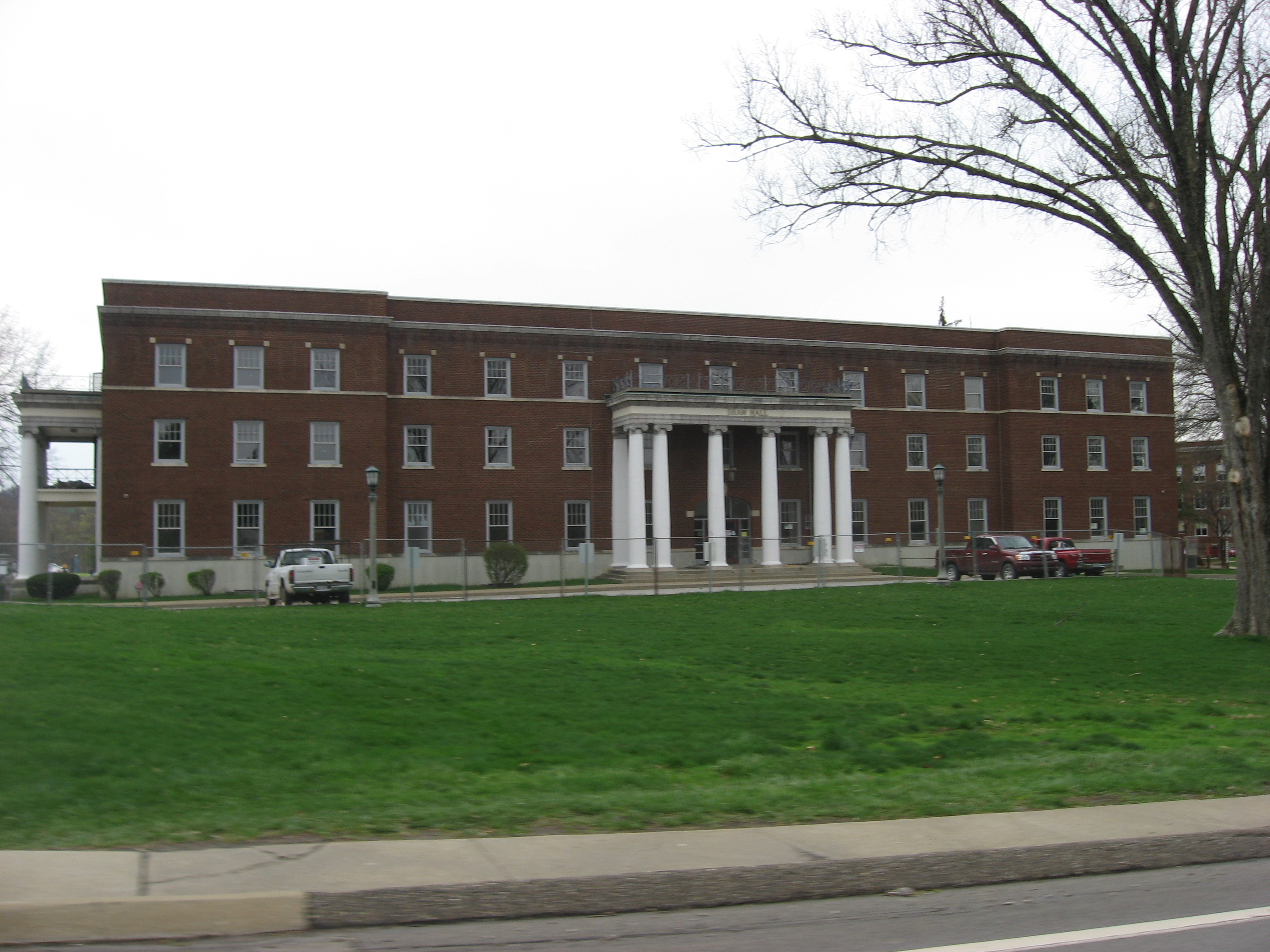
Shaw Hall

Main Hall is the university's central academic building, which contains the Gary E. West College of Business, the College of Education and Human Performance, and several original campus wings named for early West Liberty families. The Paul N. Elbin Library provides extensive academic resources across three floors, including special collections, technology-equipped study areas, and the Humanities Department. Arnett Hall of Natural Sciences houses biology and chemistry labs, and a greenhouse. College Hall includes the 450-seat Helen Pierce Elbin Auditorium and music studios. The Hall of Fine Arts, along with the Media Arts Center, serves as the creative hub for the Department of Arts and Communications, offering performance spaces and specialized labs.

Student life and university operations are centered around the College Union, which offers dining, retail, media outlets, and student services. Shaw Hall, a former residence hall now on the National Register of Historic Places, houses administrative offices for admissions and student life. Shotwell Hall, also a historic site, is home to the international and graduate studies offices.

== Academics ==
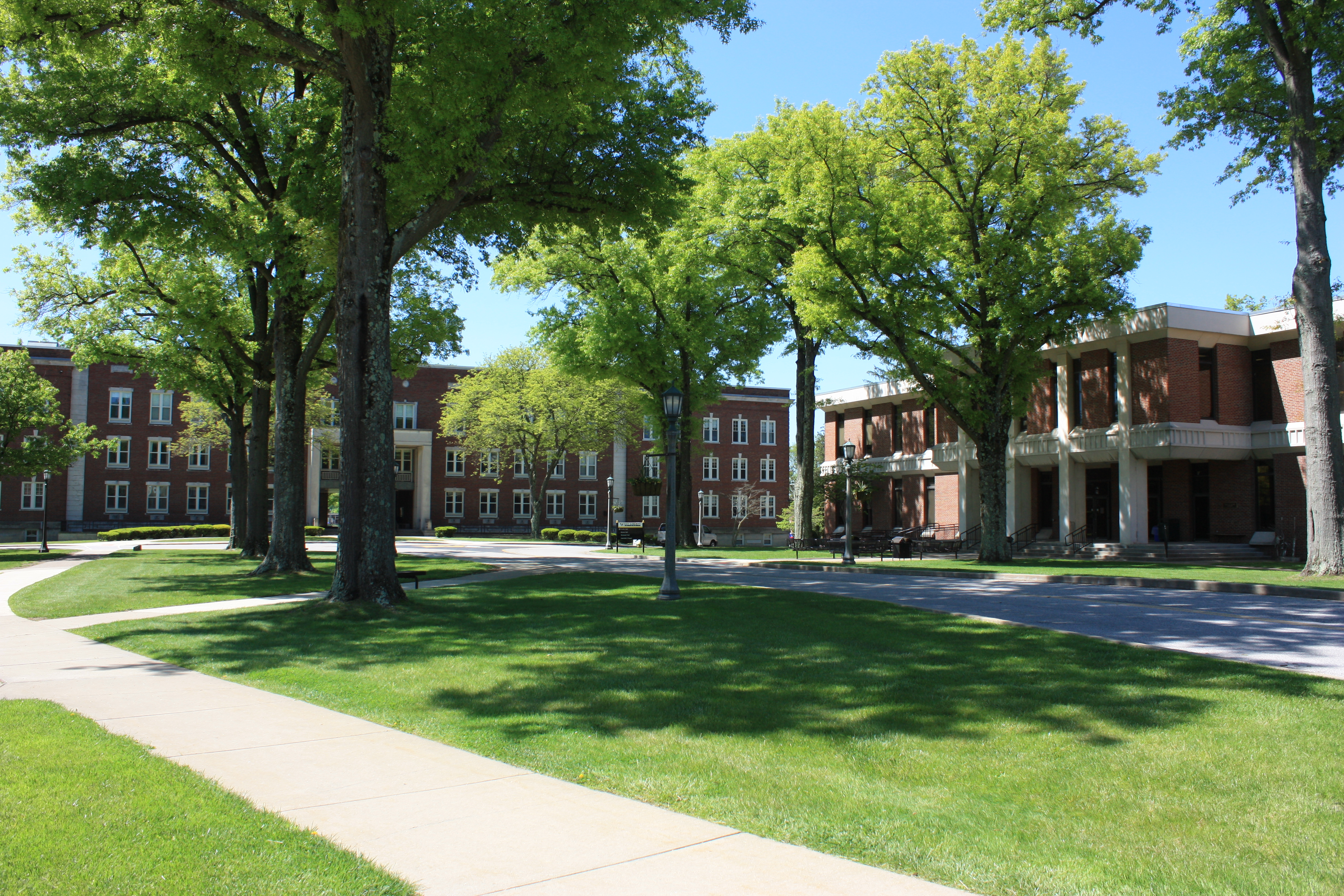
Main Hall and Paul N. Elbin Library

=== Gary E. West College of Business ===
In 1938, West Liberty Teacher's College began offering courses in Business and Commerce: a two-year Secretarial Studies program and a four-year Business education degree. By 1963, the college had established a full Department of Business Administration offering curricula in accounting, management and marketing to 338 business students. It is accredited by the International Accreditation Council for Business Education (IACBE) and offers a Bachelor of Science degree and a Masters of Business Administration (MBA).

=== College of Liberal and Creative Arts and Communication ===
The college includes the departments of Humanities and Social Sciences, English and Modern Languages, Media and Visual Arts, Music and Theater, Criminal Justice/Criminology, and Social Work. Academic disciplines in the college include visual communication design, digital media design, communications studies, journalism, public relations, broadcasting, creative arts therapy, music, theater, English, geography, history, political science, sociology, criminal justice, criminology, and social work.

==== Media Arts Center ====
The West Liberty University Media Arts Center opened in November 2006. The 5 million dollar facility includes: a recording studio, a television control, engineering core, and studio, where studio newscasts, television shows and special televised events take place. The building is also furnished with an editing classroom, 3D Audio voice-over room, and a multi-purpose classroom.

WLTV-14 (The campus's community television station) airs on Comcast Cable in Brooke, Hancock, Ohio and Marshall Counties in West Virginia. The school's community television station began in August 2007, but the television program has been on-going since 1990.

=== College of Education and Human Performance ===
The College of Education and Human Performance is divided into two departments: the Department of Professional Education and the Department of Health and Human Performance.

=== College of Sciences ===
The College of Sciences at West Liberty is divided into five departments: Physical Sciences and Mathematics (Chemistry, Mathematics, and Physics), Biological Sciences, Health Sciences (Dental Hygiene, Nursing, Medical Laboratory Sciences, and Speech Pathology and Audiology), Psychology, and Physician Assistant Studies.

==== Dental hygiene ====
West Liberty University offers one of the few comprehensive dental hygiene programs in the Ohio Valley. It was also one of the first colleges in the nation to offer such a program. The program is accredited by the American Dental Association Commission of Dental Accreditation. The program was opened in September 1938, and graduated its first class in 1940. Since then, about 2,345 students have graduated from the program. The dental hygiene students have the opportunity to enroll for a professional program ending with an Associate of Science Degree in Dental Hygiene or a professional program ending with a Bachelor of Science in Dental Hygiene. The Dental Hygiene office offers dental cleaning services for any member of the community at affordable rates.

==== Campbell Hall of Health Sciences ====
The $20 million, 70,000 sq.ft. Health Sciences Building was dedicated and opened on May 3, 2014. The Dental Hygiene, Medical Laboratory Sciences, Nursing, Physician Assistant Studies Master's Program, Speech Pathology and Audiology, and Chemistry programs are located in the new building, along with the Behavioral Health Clinic and the Speech and Hearing Clinic.

== Student life ==
Interfaith Chapel

Undergraduate demographics as of Fall 2023
Race and ethnicity	Total
White	83%
Two or more races	6%
Black	3%
International student	3%
Unknown	3%
Economic diversity
Low-income (Note: The percentage of students who received an income-based federal Pell grant intended for low-income students.)	36%
Affluent (Note: The percentage of students who are a part of the American middle class at the bare minimum.)	64%

There are seven residence halls on campus.

West Liberty University offers 9 organizations made up of fraternities and sororities, 18 academic and professional organizations, 10 honoraries, 6 sports and recreational clubs, 6 religiously affiliated groups and 23 special interest groups. There is a physical education club for students majoring in physical education, and an intramural program covering activities such as basketball, volleyball, softball, tennis, swimming, racquetball, ping pong, billiards, flag football, aerobics, euchre, and 3-on-3 basketball. This program is operated by the office of the Vice President of Student Affairs.

West Liberty University has several Greek organizations on campus.

== Athletics ==
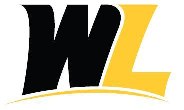
West Liberty Hilltoppers logo.

West Liberty University's Intercollegiate Athletics Program is an integral part of the institution's total educational mission. Sixteen men's and women's sports are offered: football, women's volleyball, men's and women's cross country, men's and women's basketball, wrestling, women's softball, men's baseball, men's and women's track, men's and women's golf, men and women's soccer and women's acrobatic and tumbling. The men's and women's tennis teams were discontinued in May 2023. There is also a coed cheerleading squad. The college is a member of NCAA Division II and formerly belonged to the 16-member West Virginia Intercollegiate Athletic Conference (WVIAC). In June 2012, it was one of nine WVIAC members that announced plans to leave the conference after the 2012–13 school year to start a new Division II league. Two months later, the new league was unveiled as the Mountain East Conference, with West Liberty as one of its 12 charter members.

== Alumni ==
The West Liberty University Alumni Association was founded in June 1877 with 103 members. Today, the Alumni Association represents nearly 20,000 alumni. The Alumni Association Board of Directors maintains an "Alumni Wall of Honor" to honor some of the college's distinguished alumni.

Alumni Park was home to three black granite pyramids displaying the engraved names of alumni and friends of West Liberty University. Alumni Park was located in the "heart" of the campus – just outside Main Hall and adjacent to the Union, at the edge of the 'quad'. In the summer of 2017, these structures were removed due to deterioration. A replacement wall of alumni and friends is expected to be erected within the breezeway of Main Hall. Currently, a fire globe is situated in Alumni Park.

=== Notable alumni ===
- George C. Allen II, Air National Guard Brigadier General
- Chris Booker, radio talk-show host
- Todd H. Bullard (B.A., 1953), founding member of Chi Nu fraternity and former president of Potomac State College and Bethany College
- Derrick Evans, professional football coach and politician, former West Virginia legislator
- Erik Fankhouser, professional bodybuilder, International Federation of BodyBuilding & Fitness (IFBB)
- Tim Hicks, professional football player
- Chip Ingram, Christian pastor, author, and teacher
- Mickey Marotti, football coach
- Andy McKenzie, former West Virginia Senate and mayor of Wheeling, West Virginia
- Mark Murphy, professional football player
- Joe Niekro, professional baseball player
- Brad Paisley, country music singer and songwriter; attended two years
- Maria Pappas, Cook County, Illinois Treasurer (1998–present)
- Lou Piccone, professional football player
- Rick Schneider-Calabash, animation producer, writer, director for Walt Disney Studios
- Ray Searage, professional baseball player
- Jimmy Willis (politician), member of the West Virginia House of Delegates for district 3
