= George C. Allen II =

United States Air Force personnel of the Gulf War

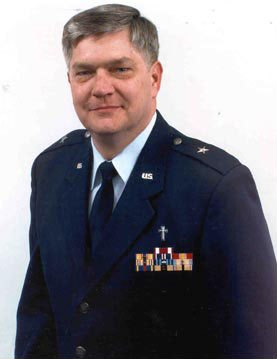
Brig. Gen. George Allen

George C. Allen II is a former brigadier general in the Delaware Air National Guard and Air National Guard Assistant to the Chief of Chaplains of the United States Air Force.

== Career ==
Allen originally joined the United States Coast Guard in 1972 and was later stationed at Coast Guard Station Boston. He joined the Delaware Air National Guard in 1979 and was assigned to the 166th Airlift Wing. Later, he would serve in the Gulf War.

In 1996, Allen became Air National Guard assistant to the Command Chaplain of Air Combat Command. He was named Air National Guard assistant to the Chief of Chaplains in 1999.

As a civilian, Allen was a reporter for The Intelligencer in Wheeling, West Virginia, and stringer for the Associated Press before becoming associate editor of Forward Movement, an official agency of The Episcopal Church, and a priest associate at Christ Church Cathedral in Cincinnati, Ohio.

Awards he received during his military career include the Meritorious Service Medal, the Air Force Commendation Medal, the Air Force Achievement Medal, the Air Force Longevity Service Award, the National Defense Service Medal, the Southwest Asia Service Medal, the Armed Forces Reserve Medal and the Air Force Training Ribbon.

== Education ==
- West Liberty University
- Episcopal Divinity School, Cambridge, Mass.
- Air War College
