= Phi Sigma Phi =

American collegiate social fraternity

- ΦΣΦ
- Founded: July 30, 1988; 38 years ago South Bend, Indiana
- Type: Social
- Affiliation: NIC
- Status: Active
- Scope: National
- Motto: "Do unto others as you would have them do unto you."
- Pillars: Honor, Justice, and Wisdom
- Colors: Cardinal Red Silver
- Symbol: The Phoenix
- Flower: Fire and Ice Rose
- Chapters: 5 Active, 20 Inactive
- Headquarters: 6771 Gifford Way; San Diego, California 92111; United States
- Website: phisigmaphi.org

Phi Sigma Phi (ΦΣΦ) (Phi Sig) is a national fraternity in the United States founded on July 30, 1988, in South Bend, Indiana, by chapters formerly of Phi Sigma Epsilon that declined to participate in that fraternity's merger into Phi Sigma Kappa. There are currently five Active Chapters and one Active Colony of Phi Sigma Phi nationwide. The current National President is University of Wisconsin-Stevens Point Alumnus, Joshua Finch.

== History ==
Phi Sigma Phi formed from the 1985 merger of Phi Sigma Epsilon and Phi Sigma Kappa. A small group of Phi Sigma Epsilon Alumni and Undergraduate Collegians opposed the merger with Phi Sigma Kappa and instead decided to form a new national fraternity.

On July 30, 1988, Phi Sigma Phi National Fraternity, Inc. was formally organized in South Bend, Indiana, to serve as a national organization. The Fraternity was founded as an evolution of ideals and dedication to independence and freedom of choice. Former Phi Sigma Epsilon alumni were elected to serve as Phi Sigma Phi's first National Council.

Seven chapters were the foundation of the new fraternity. These chapters are known as the "Founding Seven" Chapters:

- Lambda, Eastern Michigan University
- Omega, University of Wisconsin–Stout
- Phi Beta, University of Wisconsin–Eau Claire
- Phi Iota, Northland College
- Phi Kappa, West Virginia Wesleyan College
- Phi Mu, Concord University
- Sigma Zeta, University of Wisconsin–River Falls

Although there was strong support for this new fraternity from many campuses and Alumni, the first years of Phi Sigma Phi's existence were difficult. From 1988 to1990, the National Fraternity struggled for survival, and expansion was non-existent. Establishing new national programs, publications, visitations, and a new financial program were top priorities and took most of the new fraternity's energy and efforts.

In the early 1990s, the National Council and Staff of Phi Sigma Phi emphasized service and support of Members. In 1991, Epsilon Alpha chapter formed at Michigan State University. This was followed by Xi Chapter at Central Michigan University in 1995 and several other new Chapters. Phi Sigma Phi became the 66th member fraternity of the North American Interfraternity Conference (NIC) in 1997.

== Symbols ==
The Fraternity's colors are Cardinal Red and Silver. Its symbol is the Phoenix. Its flower is the Fire and Ice Rose. Its motto is ''Do unto others as you would have them do unto you.''

== Philanthropy ==
Phi Sigma Phi is a partnering organization with the President's Council on Service and Civic Participation. This partnership was first implemented by the Epsilon Zeta Chapter at Fairmont State University and was expanded to a national effort at the fraternity's July 2015 National Leadership Development Academy in Morgantown, West Virginia.

== Chapters ==
Following is a list of Phi Sigma Phi chapters. Active Chapters are indicated in bold. Inactive Chapters are in italics.

Chapter	Charter date and range	Institution	Location	Status	Ref.
Lambda	July 30, 1988–2023	Eastern Michigan University	Ypsilanti, Michigan	Inactive	(Note: "Founding Seven" Chapter, established with the National Fraternity. It was originally Chartered as a Phi Sigma Epsilon Chapter in 1934.)
**Omega**	July 30, 1988	University of Wisconsin–Stout	Menomonie, Wisconsin	Active	(Note: "Founding Seven" Chapter, established with the National Fraternity. It was originally Chartered as a Phi Sigma Epsilon Chapter in 1952.)
Phi Beta	July 30, 1988–2011	University of Wisconsin-Eau Claire	Eau Claire, Wisconsin	Inactive	(Note: "Founding Seven" Chapter, established with the National Fraternity. It was originally Chartered as a Phi Sigma Epsilon Chapter in 1952.)
Phi Iota	July 30, 1988–1990; 2001–20xx ?	Northland College	Ashland, Wisconsin	Inactive	(Note: "Founding Seven" Chapter, established with the National Fraternity. It was originally Chartered as a Phi Sigma Epsilon Chapter in 1959. After going dormant, it reformed as a Colony in 1999.)
Phi Kappa	July 30, 1988–1998	West Virginia Wesleyan College	Buckhannon, West Virginia	Withdrew (ΑΣΦ)	(Note: "Founding Seven" Chapter, established with the National Fraternity. It was originally Chartered as a Phi Sigma Epsilon Chapter in 1959. Twenty-six Members left the Chapter in 1997 and reestablished the Beta Nu chapter of Alpha Sigma Phi fraternity in 1998.)
Phi Mu	July 30, 1988–2022	Concord University	Athens, West Virginia (Note: "Founding Seven" Chapter, established with the National Fraternity July 30, 1988, but had previously been Chartered as a Phi Sigma Epsilon Chapter in 1960.)	Inactive	(Note: "Founding Seven" Chapter, established with the National Fraternity. It was originally Chartered as a Phi Sigma Epsilon Chapter in 1960.)
Sigma Zeta	July 30, 1988–1994	University of Wisconsin–River Falls	River Falls, Wisconsin	Withdrew (ΦΣΚ)	(Note: "Founding Seven" Chapter, established with the National Fraternity. It was originally Chartered as a Phi Sigma Epsilon Chapter in 1968. It withdrew from Phi Sigma Phi and joined Phi Sigma Kappa as their Sigma Zeta Chapter in 1998, but closed in 2005.)
Epsilon Eta	1988–1995	Southeastern Oklahoma State University	Durant, Oklahoma	Inactive	(Note: Chapter was originally Chartered as a Phi Sigma Epsilon Chapter in 1931.)
Epsilon Alpha	1991–1997	Michigan State University	East Lansing, Michigan	Inactive	
Xi	August 19, 1995–2023	Central Michigan University	Mt. Pleasant, Michigan	Inactive	(Note: Chapter formed from Phi Sigma Kappa, established in 1985.) (Note: The Chapter was banned permanently by the CMU administration for conduct and Risk Management issues. Phi Sigma Phi still considered Xi Chapter an Active Chapter, will full operational rights and privileges while the ban was being challenged.)
Epsilon Beta	April 20, 1996–2023	Wright State University	Dayton, Ohio	Inactive	
Epsilon Delta	1998–2008	Bluefield State College	Bluefield, West Virginia	Inactive	(Note: Chapter formed from Delta Sigma Tau, established in 1995.)
Epsilon Zeta	2000–2022	Fairmont State University	Fairmont, West Virginia	Inactive	
**Epsilon Nu**	2005	York College of Pennsylvania	York, Pennsylvania	Active	(Note: Chapter formed from Phi Sigma Pi (local), established in 1969.)
Epsilon Kappa	200x ?–20xx ?	Johnson & Wales University	Providence, Rhode Island	Inactive	
Epsilon Lambda	2010–2022	University of Michigan-Dearborn	Dearborn, Michigan	Inactive	(Note: Chapter formed as a Colony in 2009.)
Epsilon Xi	2011–2013	Long Island University	Brooklyn, New York	Inactive	
Epsilon Omicron	September 24, 2014–2018	Penn State Harrisburg	Lower Swatara Township, Pennsylvania	Inactive	(Note: Chapter formed as a Colony in 2011.)
**Kappa**	April 25, 2015	University of Wisconsin-Stevens Point	Stevens Point, Wisconsin	Active	(Note: Chapter formed as a Colony in 2012.)
**Epsilon Chi**	2018	West Virginia University	Morgantown, West Virginia	Active	
**Alpha Epsilon**	2022	University of Wisconsin–Madison	Madison, Wisconsin	Active	(Note: Chapter formed as a Colony in 2021.)
**Beta Epsilon**	2024	Charleston Southern University	North Charleston, South Carolina	Colony	
**Phi Xi**	2026	Winona State University	Winona, Minnesota	Colony	

== See also ==
- List of social fraternities and sororities
