= Phi Sigma Epsilon =

American collegiate fraternity 1910–1985

- ΦΣΕ
- Founded: February 20, 1910; 116 years ago Kansas State Normal College
- Type: Social
- Former affiliation: NIC; Association of Teachers College Fraternities
- Status: Merged
- Merge date: August 14, 1985
- Successor: Phi Sigma Kappa
- Scope: National
- Motto: "Golden Rule"
- Colors: Cardinal red and Silver
- Symbol: Triangle
- Flower: White tea rose
- Publication: The Triangulum
- Chapters: 64
- Members: 20,000 lifetime
- Nickname: Phi Sig
- Headquarters: 2925 East 96th Street; Indianapolis, Indiana 46240; United States

Phi Sigma Epsilon (ΦΣΕ) was a North American social fraternity that operated for 75 years (February 20, 1910 – August 14, 1985) until its merger with the Phi Sigma Kappa (ΦΣΚ) fraternity. In 1985, most Phi Sigma Epsilon chapters participated in the merger. Phi Sigma Kappa incorporated many of the symbols of Phi Sigma Epsilon into its own, changing its crest, and expanding its Cardinal Principals, symbolism, rituals, and historical canon to embrace the milestones of Phi Sigma Epsilon's development. These changes were soon fully adopted by all chapters of the fraternity which retained the name Phi Sigma Kappa.

Before the merger, both fraternities used the nickname Phi Sig. This was one of many similarities between the groups. A few chapters and scattered alumni refused the merger, eventually forming a new national fraternity Phi Sigma Phi that incorporated traditions similar to the original Phi Sigma Epsilon.

== History ==
Phi Sigma Epsilon Fraternity was founded on February 20, 1910, at Kansas State Normal College, now Emporia State University. Its founders were Raymond Victor Bottomly, W. Roy Campbell, W. Ingram Forde, Humphrey Jones, Robert C. Marley, Orin M. Rhine, and Fred M. Thompson.

Initially, the fraternity existed as an underground organization because secret societies were frowned upon by many of the college authorities until 1912. The fraternity's willingness to cooperate and its program of scholastic and social improvements won over its opposition. In 1913, Phi Sigma Epsilon was officially recognized on campus. Professor C. R. Phipps became its sponsor.

In 1926, Phi Sigma Epsilon held preliminary meetings with two nearby local fraternities: Sigma Delta Tau (Note: Not to be confused with the national sorority of the same name. That sorority, also Sigma Delta Tau, had been founded in 1917 and had created twelve chapters by the time the three local fraternities constituting ΦΣΕ met in their first conclave to form Phi Sigma Epsilon into a national fraternity. Such naming confusion happened occasionally with that period's blizzard of the creation of new local chapters across America.) of Kirksville State Teachers College and Pi Sigma Epsilon (Note: This local Pi Sigma Epsilon should not be confused with the national professional fraternity of the same name, founded in 1952 for marketing and sales management students.) of Kansas State Teachers College. These three groups joined as Phi Sigma Epsilon, becoming a national teachers' college fraternity at its first conclave on December 30, 1927. The name was selected based on which group was established first. Appointed members developed the fraternity's charter, constitution, and bylaws. Others, led by Fred Schwengel, authored the fraternity's new ritual over the following year.

In 1932, the fraternity began publishing The Triangulum, a magazine for members. In 1937, after a year of negotiations with other fraternities at teachers' colleges, Phi Sigma Epsilon worked with Sigma Tau Gamma to form the Association of Teachers College Fraternities on January 9, 1937.

The fraternity expanded to many other campuses until World War II when an acute manpower crisis caused every chapter to cease operations between 1941 and 1946. Under the leadership of national president Shannon Flowers, the fraternity was successfully revived after the war with all chapters reopening. With the influx of returning GIs to colleges after the war, the mission of many teacher's colleges expanded. By 1947, Phi Sigma Epsilon similarly broadened its focus and no longer remained strictly a fraternity for teachers, embracing the general academic population. In 1952, the fraternity became a junior member of the North American Interfraternity Conference (NIC) and a senior member in 1965.

Half of the Fraternity's chapters came from affiliating with local chapters, some that had existed for many decades before joining Phi Sigma Epsilon. (Note: Where known, these are noted in the references for each chapter on the List of Phi Sigma Kappa chapters, with information taken from All the Phi Sigs, the history of the combined fraternity of Phi Sigma Kappa and Phi Sigma Epsilon.) In most cases, these former locals became the strongest or most resilient chapters. The others started as new groups on campus and were often short-lived, especially those formed from 1950 onward.

=== Growth and decline ===
Phi Sigma Epsilon had an unofficial goal of having sixty chapters, a milestone it reached under the leadership of President James Whitfield, doubling in size between 1958 and 1970. Whitfield retired in 1970, after twelve years as president. This was the high-water mark for the fraternity. On February 20, 1970, the 60th anniversary of the founding was observed in Emporia. Founder and first initiate, Fred Thompson with James Whitfield, cut the anniversary cake, which bore seven candles in the representation of the seven founders. Thompson was 86 years old at the 23rd conclave, on September 5, 1970.

By 1972, growth had ceased while expenses grew. Like many fraternities, Phi Sigma Epsilon had difficulty managing its chapters in that time of social change. The lack of fraternity interest on its campuses was another contributing factor. Attempts were made to innovate, for example, by hosting regionalized conclaves rather than a single national meeting. By the beginning of the 1978–79 academic year, there were only 38 chapters on the roll, nine fewer than in 1974 and 22 fewer than in 1970. This alarming situation precipitated aggressive action to shore up or re-charter struggling groups, resulting in 45 chapters by the 1980 conclave.

Fiscal problems and staff difficulties continued to weaken the fraternity. Complaints came in from various chapters of dissatisfaction with services and a lack of cooperation from the national office. Between 1980 and 1984, significant concerns were raised about the financial health of the organization. Executive officer Ric Hoskin, who had served since the mid-1960s, resigned on July 28, 1984. An emergency council meeting was called where president John Sandwell was appointed to replace Hoskin as interim acting executive officer. An audit confirmed the council's worst fears: Phi Sigma Epsilon's only asset was its equity in its national headquarters building.

One month later, at a belated and hastily called 30th Conclave, James Whitfield was again elected to serve as president. The following day, immediate past president Sandwell resigned as executive officer. The Council named Whitfield acting executive officer without compensation. Leaders also considered all aspects of revitalization and recessed the conclave until the summer of 1985. The fall ushered in a flurry of activity, with plans for a follow-up Council meeting and publication of a series of chapter bulletins to teach the basics of fraternity management.

=== Merger ===
A few months after the fall 1984 council meeting, Whitfield attended a NIC meeting on Dec. 1, 1984. There, he met Phi Sigma Kappa's grand president, Anthony Fusaro. They were seated next to each other due to the alphabetized seating of all the fraternities. While talking to Fusaro, Whitfield learned that two Phi Sigma Epsilon chapters—the Phi Epsilon chapter at Rider College and the Epsilon Tau chapter at Ball State University—had contacted Phi Sigma Kappa during the 1983-84 year, seeking assistance from Phi Sigma Kappa because of "the lack of services from Phi Sigma Epsilon". Phi Sigma Kappa executive director Brett Champion explained to these chapters that NIC rules prohibited this, and then Phi Sigma Epsilon president Sandwell was contacted. However, in the transition from Sandwell to Whitfield, this information had not been shared.

A friendship developed, in this meeting of peers. The word "merger" was mentioned, and the two agreed to talk further, expanding the conversation to a half dozen or more fraternal leaders from both groups. These men realized the similarities between the fraternities and set a framework to continue the discussion. A favorable response by both organizations' councils led to the preparation of merger documents. Phi Sigma Epsilon sent a letter to its chapters and alumni clubs, with 26 of 29 respondents declaring in the affirmative, two negative votes, both from alumni clubs, and one un-indicated.

Phi Sigma Epsilon was scheduled to resume its conclave on June 1, 1985. The evening prior, the council met to review general fraternity operations, but final decisions on all items were deferred until action on the merger vote. There was a significant division of opinion and the council members were lobbied well into the evening. The next day, the final vote was 40 to 39 in favor of the merger. Active chapters more strongly supported the action, with alumni less inclined. The larger chapters voted significantly for the merger. Phi Sigma Epsilon's 31st and last conclave's final vote was the unanimous selection of James Whitfield to sign and implement the merger documents. It was announced that Phi Sigma Kappa had already voted by mail overwhelmingly in favor of the merger, an action that was ratified at its 50th Convention by a unanimous vote, held later that summer on August 14, 1985.

With the merger, all Phi Sigma Epsilon alumni were welcomed into equal status in Phi Sigma Kappa. A vigorous plan was set in motion to onboard active chapters of Phi Sigma Epsilon as Phi Sigma Kappa chapters. All living past presidents of Phi Sigma Epsilon were inducted into Phi Sigma Kappa's court of honor. Phi Sigma Epsilon's past president Shannon Flowers became its recorder. James Whitfield and Larry Beck of Phi Sigma Epsilon were placed onto an enlarged grand council as directors, with Phi Sigma Epsilon's Ron Cowan Jr. joining that body in 1987. Scott Hull of Phi Sigma Epsilon was brought on as a fourth leadership consultant on staff. Fred Schwengel, who witnessed the formation of Phi Sigma Epsilon as a national fraternity and wrote its ritual in 1927, agreed to serve as a historian for the combined fraternity and as a trustee of the Phi Sigma Kappa Foundation.

Guided by the two men who knew the two rituals best, Schwengel and Fusaro, the Phi Sigma Kappa's Ritual of Association was rewritten to include significant portions of the Phi Sigma Epsilon ritual. The Phi Sigma Epsilon ritual itself was cast into a special lecture added to the ritual book of all chapters for use on particular occasions. Similarly, Phi Sigma Kappa's Cardinal Principals were amended to reflect the ideals of Phi Sigma Epsilon: justice, wisdom, and honor.

The fraternity took action over the next several years to assist former Phi Sigma Epsilon chapters in their transition to the revised ritual, operations, and requirements of the greatly enlarged fraternity. The fraternity agreed to honor the badges and words of recognition of both fraternities when presented by visiting alumni. At the 1987 convention, the Phi Sigma Kappa flag and crest were changed to incorporate the symbolism of Phi Sigma Epsilon.

All active Phi Sigma Epsilon chapters were welcomed into Phi Sigma Kappa, and most joined. While most Phi Sigma Epsilon chapters, their alumni, and most current and past national officers took part in the merger, a small percentage of active chapters did not. Some chapters were at a level of disorganization or actual dormancy that there were no members left on those campuses to manage the merger. The Phi Tau chapter at Cornell University was released to join another national organization due to the presence of both chapters on campus.

A few opted immediately to decline and seven chapters deliberated on the matter between 1985 and 1987, eventually choosing to revert to local status in anticipation of the entity that would become Phi Sigma Phi in 1988. (Note: The organization took several years and the eventual name of the new fraternity was not determined until ΦΣΚ and the non-merging chapters resolved trademark and copyright issues.) These include the Omega chapter at the University of Wisconsin–Stout, the Phi Mu chapter at Concord University, the Phi Kappa chapter at West Virginia Wesleyan College, the Phi Iota chapter at Northland College, the Sigma Zeta chapter at the University of Wisconsin–River Falls, and the Phi Beta chapter at the University of Wisconsin–Eau Claire. In addition, the alumni of the Lambda chapter at Eastern Michigan University seceded and joined Phi Sigma Phi, resulting in both the Phi Sigma Kappa's Epsilon Lambda chapter which was a continuation of the active group, and Phi Sigma Phi's Lambda chapter which was established by the Phi Sigma Epsilon alumni who chose not to merge.

For the groups that declined the merger and for the long-dormant groups, Phi Sigma Kappa has continued to reach out the hand of brotherhood to alumni of those chapters. There is no legal connection between Phi Sigma Phi and Phi Sigma Kappa, nor their respective chapters, even if there is an occasional similarity between chapter names. There is no formal agreement on naming rights between Phi Sigma Kappa and Phi Sigma Phi, thus each fraternity is free to name its chapters as it sees fit.

The merger terms allowed a special naming provision for the first three chapters of Phi Sigma Epsilon. Instead of starting with the letter Epsilon, their name letters were reversed, designating Alpha Epsilon chapter, Beta Epsilon chapter, etc. This model was only used for the first three, oldest chapters of Phi Sigma Epsilon.

From 1985 onward, the continuing history of Phi Sigma Epsilon may be found in Phi Sigma Kappa's article.

== Symbols ==
Phi Sigma Epsilon's motto was "Golden Rule". Its colors were cardinal red and silver. Its symbol was the triangle. Its flower was the white tea rose. The fraternity's publication was The Triangulum. Its nickname was Phi Sig.

== Chapters ==
Phi Sigma Epsilon had chartered 64 chapters and had one unchartered colony before its merger.

== See also ==
- Phi Sigma Kappa
- List of Phi Sigma Kappa chapters
- List of Phi Sigma Kappa members
- Phi Sigma Phi
