= West Liberty, West Virginia =

Town in West Virginia, US

- Town
- West Liberty University

- Location of West Liberty in Ohio County, West Virginia.
- Coordinates: 40°9′56″N 80°35′41″W
- Country: United States
- State: West Virginia
- County: Ohio
- Incorporated: 1975

Area
  - Total: 1.09 sq mi (2.83 km^{2})
  - Land: 1.09 sq mi (2.83 km^{2})
  - Water: 0 sq mi (0.00 km^{2})
- Elevation: 1,224 ft (373 m)

Population (2020)
  - Total: 1,454
  - Estimate (2021): 1,548
  - Density: 1,325.5/sq mi (511.77/km^{2})
- Time zone: UTC-5 (Eastern (EST))
  - Summer (DST): UTC-4 (EDT)
- ZIP code: 26074
- Area code: 304
- FIPS code: 54-85876
- GNIS feature ID: 1555947
- Website: https://www.westlibertywv.gov/

West Liberty is a town in Ohio County, West Virginia, United States. The population was 1,557 at the 2020 census. It is part of the Wheeling metropolitan area and is home to West Liberty University.

== History ==
West Liberty was given its name during the American Revolution. It served as the county seat of Ohio County, Virginia from 1777 to 1797.

== Geography ==
West Liberty is located at 40°9′56″N 80°35′41″W (40.165495, −80.594656).

According to the United States Census Bureau, the town has a total area of 0.68 square miles (1.76 km^{2}), all land.

== Demographics ==
Historical population
Census	Pop.	Note	%±
1850	219		—
1860	280		27.9%
1870	251		−10.4%
1880	269		7.2%
1980	744		—
1990	1,434		92.7%
2000	1,220		−14.9%
2010	1,542		26.4%
2020	1,454		−5.7%
2021 (est.)	1,548	▲	6.5%
U.S. Decennial Census

=== 2010 census ===
At the 2010 census there were 1,542 people, 243 households, and 119 families living in the town. The population density was 2,267.6 inhabitants per square mile (875.5/km^{2}). There were 263 housing units at an average density of 386.8 per square mile (149.3/km^{2}). The racial makeup of the town was 94.3% White, 3.2% African American, 0.3% Asian, 0.1% from other races, and 2.0% from two or more races. Hispanic or Latino of any race were 1.2%.

Of the 243 households 18.1% had children under the age of 18 living with them, 34.6% were married couples living together, 7.4% had a female householder with no husband present, 7.0% had a male householder with no wife present, and 51.0% were non-families. 27.2% of households were one person and 9.5% were one person aged 65 or older. The average household size was 2.23 and the average family size was 2.85.

The median age in the town was 20.9 years. 5% of residents were under the age of 18; 73.2% were between the ages of 18 and 24; 8.2% were from 25 to 44; 9.2% were from 45 to 64; and 4.2% were 65 or older. The gender makeup of the town was 43.3% male and 56.7% female.

=== 2000 census ===
At the 2000 census there were 1,220 people, 241 households, and 120 families living in the town. The population density was 1,865.9 inhabitants per square mile (724.7/km^{2}). There were 285 housing units at an average density of 435.9 per square mile (169.3/km^{2}). The racial makeup of the town was 96.64% White, 1.89% African American, 0.08% Native American, 0.33% Asian, 0.33% from other races, and 0.74% from two or more races. Hispanic or Latino of any race were 0.74%.

Of the 241 households 15.8% had children under the age of 18 living with them, 39.4% were married couples living together, 5.8% had a female householder with no husband present, and 50.2% were non-families. 26.1% of households were one person and 5.8% were one person aged 65 or older. The average household size was 2.29 and the average family size was 2.93.

The age distribution was 6.7% under the age of 18, 70.0% from 18 to 24, 10.9% from 25 to 44, 8.2% from 45 to 64, and 4.2% 65 or older. The median age was 21 years. For every 100 females there were 103.0 males. For every 100 females age 18 and over, there were 101.4 males.

The median household income was $28,393 and the median family income was $38,125. Males had a median income of $18,750 versus $19,375 for females. The per capita income for the town was $7,573. About 13.3% of families and 29.0% of the population were below the poverty line, including 8.2% of those under age 18 and 15.7% of those age 65 or over.

== Education ==
West Liberty is the site of West Liberty University, a public university established in 1837.

== Notable person ==
- Thomas Ewing (1789–1871), served in the U.S. Senate as well as serving as the Secretary of the Treasury and the first Secretary of the Interior
