= List of Worcester Polytechnic Institute fraternities and sororities =

The following is a list of Worcester Polytechnic Institute fraternities and sororities. As of 2026, there were thirteen active fraternities and six sororities.

== Fraternities ==
The governing body of all fraternities is the Interfraternity Council.

Organization	Local charter date and range	Chapter name	Status	Ref.
Alpha Chi Rho	1978	Delta Sigma Phi	Active	(Note: Chapter formed from Delta Sigma Tau, established in 1966.)
Alpha Tau Omega	1906	Gamma Sigma	Active	(Note: Chapter formed from Arm & Hammer, organized in 1903.)
Beta Theta Pi	2019	Eta Tau	Active	(Note: The chapter started as a colony in 2012.)
Lambda Chi Alpha	1913–1988, 1994	Pi	Active	(Note: Chapter formed from Zeta Sigma Tau, local fraternity established in 1912.)
Phi Gamma Delta	1891	Pi Iota	Active	(Note: Originally formed in 1886 as the Zeta chapter or "Worcester chapter" of Q.T.V., an early Latin-named regional fraternity.)
Phi Kappa Theta	1936-2004, 2008	Massachusetts Lambda	Active	(Note: Chapter formed from the Lambda chapter of Theta Kappa Phi when the two fraternities merged in 1959. Lambda was formed from Friars, established in 1930.)
Phi Sigma Kappa	1914	Epsilon Deuteron	Active	(Note: Chapter formed from local fraternity Theta Chi, established in 1902, which renamed to Kappa Xi Alpha in 1909 when the national chapter chartered on campus.)
Sigma Alpha Epsilon	1894	Massachusetts Delta	Active	(Note: Chapter formed from the Tech Cooperative Society, organized in 1889.)
Sigma Phi Epsilon	1938	Massachusetts Beta	Active	(Note: Chapter formed from the Beta Alpha chapter of Theta Upsilon Omega, established in 1924, as part of the national merger of the two fraternities. Beta Alpha was formed from Delta Tau, a local fraternity chartered in 1906.)
Sigma Pi	1965	Gamma Iota	Active	(Note: Chapter formed from Psi Theta Nu, a local fraternity established in 1962.)
Tau Kappa Epsilon	1959	Zeta Mu	Active	(Note: Chapter formed from Sigma Delta, a local fraternity established in 1956.)
Theta Chi	1909	Epsilon	Active	(Note: Chapter formed from Pi Omega Pi, a local fraternity established in 1905 by students who were members of athletic teams.)
Zeta Psi	1976	Pi Tau	Active	
Alpha Epsilon Pi	1940–1973	Epsilon Deuteron	Inactive	(Note: Chapter formed from the Theta chapter of Sigma Omega Psi, established in 1919, as part of the national merger of the two fraternities. Theta was formed from the Six Tex Club, established in 1919.)

== Sororities ==
The governing body of the sororities is the Panhellenic Council.

Organization	Local charter date and range	Chapter name	Status	Ref.
Alpha Gamma Delta	1980	Zeta Zeta	Active	
Alpha Phi	2011	Iota Omicron	Active	
Alpha Xi Delta	2007	Iota Xi	Active	(Note: Started as a Sorority Interest Group in 2005.)
Chi Omega	2014	Theta Mu	Active	
Phi Sigma Sigma	1977	Gamma Iota	Active	
Theta Nu Xi	2010	Alpha Lambda	Active	
Delta Phi Epsilon	1979-1993	Phi Omicron	Inactive	(Note: Chapter formed from Zeta Psi Little Sisters, established in 1977.)
Zeta Phi Beta	2022-2025	Psi Phi	Inactive	
