= Sigma Alpha Epsilon Pi =

American collegiate Jewish sorority

- ΣΑΕΠ
- Founded: October 1, 1998; 27 years ago University of California, Davis
- Type: Social
- Affiliation: Independent
- Status: Active
- Emphasis: Jewish
- Scope: National
- Motto: "Spirit, Strength, Sisterhood"
- Colors: Blue and Gold
- Symbol: Paw
- Flower: Blue Iris
- Jewel: Sapphire
- Mascot: Lioness
- Publication: The Iris Petal
- Philanthropy: American Jewish World Service
- Chapters: 11 active
- Members: 750+ active
- Headquarters: Seattle, Washington; United States
- Website: www.sigmaaepi.com

Sigma Alpha Epsilon Pi (ΣΑΕΠ) is a national Jewish sorority. It was founded on October 1, 1998, at the University of California, Davis.

== History ==
In the early 1990s with the closing of a national Jewish sorority on its campus, the University of California, Davis was left without a Jewish women's social organization. Several women on campus noticed the gap left by the absence of the former sorority and began strategizing how to start an organization on campus that would fill the need. Members of Alpha Epsilon Pi, a national Jewish fraternity, also urged the women of Davis to start a Jewish women's social organization of their own. With a positive response from the campus, Sigma Alpha Epsilon Pi was formed.

The "Sigma" is meant to represent "sisters of" in honor of Alpha Epsilon Pi's contributions towards the formation of the sorority. Sigma is also the 18th letter of the Greek alphabet; in Jewish tradition, the number eighteen means chai (life). The six women who founded the sorority—Alycia Seaman, Erin Glick, Leah Dansker, Rachel Rothfarb, Erin Barker, and Dana Miller—are considered the eternal mothers of the sorority.

Despite its formative Jewish identity, the sorority allows no discrimination based on race, ethnicity, national origin, religion, sexual orientation, or handicap. SAEPi's publication is called The Iris Petal, with a quarterly publication schedule.

The first season of MTV’s Sorority Life was filmed in the spring of 2002 on the UC Davis campus featuring members and pledges of ΣΑΕΠ. Through the airing of the show, ΣΑΕΠ began to expand across the country.

== Symbols ==
The sorority's mascot is the lioness, representing "strength, power, and force." The sorority's flower is the blue iris. From the Iris, its colors are blue and gold, explained as. "Blue is prominent in Judaism, and gold symbolizes the richness ΣΑΕΠ brings to its members." Additionally, these colors are used to identify the University of California, where the sorority was founded. The sorority's gemstone is the sapphire.

== Governance ==
A national board was started in the summer of 2002 to oversee the expansion and growth of ΣΑΕΠ as a nationwide sorority. Currently, there are seven alumnae from different chapters voluntarily serving as directors on the National Board. In early 2017, the National Board voted to restructure to consolidate operational functions into the Executive Office, maintaining the National Board for governance, strategic planning, and oversight.

== Philanthropy ==
At the 2008 national convention, Cancer Schmancer was selected as the sorority's national philanthropy. In 2011, the National Board re-evaluated the national philanthropy and decided to move on to an organization that encompasses all of the philosophies of Sigma Alpha Epsilon Pi. American Jewish World Service was chosen. In addition to the national philanthropy, some chapters also support local philanthropies.

== Chapters ==
In the following list of Sigma Alpha Epsilon Pi chapters, active chapters are listed in bold and inactive chapters are listed in italics.

Name	Charter date and range	Institution	Location	Status	Ref.
**Charter**	October 1, 1998	University of California, Davis	Davis, California	Active	
Alpha	2003–2005	Arizona State University	Tempe, Arizona	Inactive	
**Beta**	2003–2008, 2018–2024	University of Minnesota	Minneapolis, Minnesota	Inactive	(Note: Chapter formed from Achayot, established in 2002.)
Gamma	2003–2006	University of California, Riverside	Riverside, California	Inactive	
Delta	2005–2022	University of California, Santa Cruz	Santa Cruz, California	Inactive	
Epsilon	2005–2005	University of Oregon	Eugene, Oregon	Inactive	
Zeta	2005–2011	Virginia Tech	Blacksburg, Virginia	Inactive	
Eta	2008–2020	University of California, Los Angeles	Los Angeles, California	Inactive	
Theta	2008–2011	Eastern Michigan University	Ypsilanti, Michigan	Inactive	
Iota	2009–2014	University of Maryland, Baltimore County	Baltimore, Maryland	Inactive	
Kappa	2009–2020	University of Cincinnati	Cincinnati, Ohio	Inactive	
Lambda	2010–2017	University of Missouri	Columbia, Missouri	Inactive	
Mu	2010–2020	James Madison University	Harrisonburg, Virginia	Inactive	
Nu	2011–2019	University of California, Santa Barbara	Santa Barbara, California	Inactive	
**Xi**	2013	Binghamton University	Binghamton, New York	Active	
**Omicron**	2014	California State University, Northridge	Northridge, California	Active	
**Pi**	2015	University of Nevada, Reno	Reno, Nevada	Active	
Rho	2017–2019	Rutgers University	New Brunswick, New Jersey	Inactive	
Sigma	2018–2021	Queens College	Queens, New York	Inactive	
**Tau**	2017	Colorado State University	Fort Collins, Colorado	Active	
**Upsilon**	2018	University of Colorado, Boulder	Boulder, Colorado	Active	
Phi	2018–2019	California State University, Fullerton	Fullerton, California	Inactive	
Chi	2018–2019	Hunter College, City University of New York	New York City, New York	Inactive	
Psi	2018–2019	Wilfrid Laurier University	Waterloo, Ontario	Inactive	
Omega	2018–2022	Florida Gulf Coast University	Fort Myers, Florida	Inactive	
Sigma Alpha	2018–2021	State University of New York, New Paltz	New Paltz, New York	Inactive	
Sigma Beta	2018–2019	Ryerson University	Toronto, Ontario	Inactive	
Sigma Gamma	2018–2019	University of Nevada, Las Vegas	Las Vegas, Nevada	Inactive	
Sigma Delta	2018–2020	Florida International University	South Miami, Florida	Inactive	
Sigma Epsilon	2018	University of Pittsburgh	Pittsburgh, Pennsylvania	Inactive	
**Sigma Zeta**	2018	Brandeis University	Waltham, Massachusetts	Active	
Sigma Eta	2019	Stockton University	Galloway, New Jersey	Inactive	
Sigma Theta	2019–2020	University of Hartford	West Hartford, Connecticut	Active	
Sigma Iota	2019–2020	Baruch College	New York, New York	Inactive	
Sigma Kappa	2019–2021	Towson University	Towson, Maryland	Inactive	
**Sigma Lambda**	2019	George Washington University	Washington, D.C.	Active	
**Sigma Mu**	2022	University at Albany	Albany, New York	Inactive	

== See also ==
- List of social sororities and women's fraternities
- List of Jewish fraternities and sororities
