= Alpha Mu Sigma =

American Jewish fraternity (1914–1963)

- ΑΜΣ
- Founded: March 21, 1914; 112 years ago Cooper Union
- Type: Social
- Affiliation: Independent
- Status: Defunct
- Defunct date: 1963
- Emphasis: Jewish
- Scope: National
- Colors: Black and Gold
- Flower: Yellow chrysanthemum
- Publication: The Shield
- Chapters: 23
- Headquarters: United States

Alpha Mu Sigma (ΑΜΣ) was an historically Jewish fraternity founded in March 1914 at Cooper Union. It disbanded in 1963.

== History ==
Alpha Mu Sigma was founded at Cooper Union on March 21, 1914. According to Baird's Manual, "The original plan was to limit membership to men of the Jewish faith and the first expansion was limited to similar engineering institutions." Its founders were:

- Irwin S. Chanin
- Henry Charles Dinney
- Irving H. Fisher
- Edward D. Fox
- Henry I. Gilbert
- Theodore F. Haynes
- Julius Liebing
- Benjamin Rothstein
- Saul Shaw
- Samuel H. Solodar
- Jonas I. Speciner
- Joseph Spies

The fraternity expanded many chapters in the 1920s. However, only a few survived the Great Depression. Its total membership in 1945 was 1,500.

The national fraternity disbanded in 1963, with the remaining four chapters becoming inactive or being absorbed by other, larger Jewish fraternities. Alpha chapter at Cooper Union functioned until 1971.

== Symbols ==
Alpha Mu Sigma's badge is a black concave shield with the Greek letters ΑΜΣ vertically in gold with a border of sixteen pearls and sapphires in the corners. Its pledge ben is a black enamel shield, with a jagged white streak through it.

The fraternity's colors are black and gold. Its flower is the yellow chrysanthemum. Its magazine is The Shield.

== Chapters ==
Following is a list of the chapters of Alpha Mu Sigma, with inactive chapters and institutions in italics.

Chapter	Charter date and range	Institution	Location	Status	Ref.
Alpha	March 21, 1914 – 1971	Cooper Union Institute of Technology	New York City, New York	Inactive	
Beta	1917–1930, 1948–1963	City College of New York	New York City, New York	Inactive	
Gamma	1917–1925, 1935–1938	Brooklyn Polytechnic Institute	Brooklyn, New York City, New York	Inactive	
Delta	1919–1926	Massachusetts Institute of Technology	Cambridge, Massachusetts	Inactive	
Epsilon	1920–1921	Columbia University	New York City, New York	Inactive	
Zeta	1921–1940	New York University	New York City, New York	Inactive	
Eta	1922–1923	Harvard University	Cambridge, Massachusetts	Inactive	
Theta	1922–1923	Bellevue Hospital Medical College of New York University	New York City, New York	Inactive	
Iota	1922–1923	Yale University	New Haven, Connecticut	Inactive	
Lambda	1923–1925	University of Pennsylvania	Philadelphia, Pennsylvania	Inactive	
Mu	1925–1926	University of Maryland	College Park, Maryland	Inactive	
Nu	1925–1926	University of Virginia	Charlottesville, Virginia	Withdrew (ΤΕΦ)	(Note: Became the "Tau Nu chapter" of Tau Epsilon Phi in 1936.)
Omicron	1926–1927	University of Southern California	Los Angeles, California	Inactive	
Xi	1927–193x ?	Union College	Schenectady, New York	Inactive	(Note: Chapter formed from Sigma Lambda Chi (local), established in 1925.)
Rho	1927–1928	University of Alabama	Tuscaloosa, Alabama	Inactive	
Pi	1928–1956	Long Island University	Brooklyn, New York City, New York	Withdrew (ΤΔΦ)	(Note: Chapter formed from Lambda Iota Upsilon (local), established in 1927.) (Note: Became the Tau Xi chapter of Tau Delta Phi in 1956. Some of ΤΔΦ's records were lost; While the Almanac notes in the listing for ΤΔΦ that the Alpha Mu Sigma chapter from which it evolved dates to 1920, this appears to be an error. A 1928 start date for Pi chapter of ΑΜΣ is more likely, confirmed by the Baird's Manual chapter list for ΑΜΣ and the date of the originating local.)
Tau (1)	1928–1930	Roanoke College	Salem, Virginia	Inactive	
Kappa	1929–1930	Boston University	Boston, Massachusetts	Inactive	
Sigma	1930–1931	Lewis Institute	Chicago, Illinois	Inactive	
Tau (2)	1937–1938	George Washington University	Washington, D.C.	Inactive	
Upsilon	1937–1960	Brooklyn College	Brooklyn, New York City, New York	Inactive	
Phi (1)	1939–1963	St. John's University	Queens, New York	Inactive	
Phi (2)	1958–1962	Pratt Institute	Brooklyn, New York City, New York	Withdrew (ΤΕΦ)	(Note: Became the "Tau Omicron chapter" of Tau Epsilon Phi in 1963.)

== See also ==
- List of Jewish fraternities and sororities
