= Rho Pi Phi =

North American pharmacy fraternity

- ΡΠΦ
- Founded: January 20, 1919; 107 years ago Massachusetts College of Pharmacy
- Type: Professional
- Affiliation: PFA
- Former affiliation: PIC
- Status: Active
- Emphasis: Pharmacy
- Scope: International
- Colors: Dark blue White
- Publication: ROPE Links
- Chapters: 5 (active)
- Nickname: ROPE, RPP, RPF
- Headquarters: 9280 Hamlin Avenue; Des Plaines, Illinois 60016; United States

Rho Pi Phi International Pharmaceutical Fraternity (ΡΠΦ) is a co-ed collegiate professional fraternity dedicated to the profession of pharmacy.

== History ==
In November 1918, students at the Massachusetts College of Pharmacy established the Ram Bam Pharmaceutical Society. Its members, thirteen men and three women, formed Ram Bam after a campus bulletin stated that non-white and Jewish students were not welcome in existing fraternities. Dean Theodore Bradley helped the students create their non-sectarian organization.

On January 20, 1919, its members agreed to form Rho Pi Phi, a pharmaceutical fraternity. Rho Pi Phi was founded to promote friendship, professionalism, and community service. The thirteen founders and charter members of Rho Pi Phi were:

- Samuel Deutchman
- Joseph Dunn
- Robert Goodless
- Samuel Greenberg
- Samuel Nannis
- Ralph Polian
- Max Stoller
- Israel Stone
- Louis Tankel
- Isaac Weiser
- Hyman Wolf
- Irving Zolotoy

In 1922, the fraternity held its first national convention, electing a Supreme Council and adopting a constitution. It became an international fraternity with the chartering of Nu chapter at the University of Toronto in 1926. Later, the fraternity formed alumni chapters.

== Symbols and traditions ==
The colors of Rho Pi Phi are blue and white. The fraternity's badge is a diamond shape in gold. Its center is black enamel with the Greek letters ΡΠΦ in gold, surrounded by twelve pearls, with a thirteenth pearl in the enamel. Its quarterly publication, the International Rope News, started in 1929; it is now called ROPE Links.

The motto of Rho Pi Phi is:

To maintain the ethical standards, dignity of, and pride in the most ancient and honorable profession of pharmacy.
To contribute to the moral, social, and intellectual welfare of all students in Pharmacy.
That we may take the lamp of research into the dark recesses of things unknown and make our contribution to our fellow man.

== Chapters ==
Following is a list of Rho Pi Pi chapters. Active chapters are indicated in bold. Inactive chapters are in italics.

Chapter	Charter date	Institution	Location	Status	Ref.
Alpha	January 20, 1919	Massachusetts College of Pharmacy	Boston, Massachusetts	Inactive	
**Beta**	1921	Albany College of Pharmacy and Health Sciences	Albany, New York	Active	
Gamma	1921	Columbia University	New York City, New York	Inactive	
Delta	1922	University of Rhode Island College of Pharmacy	Kingston, Rhode Island	Inactive	
Epsilon	1922	University at Buffalo School of Pharmacy and Pharmaceutical Sciences	Buffalo, New York	Inactive	
Zeta	1923	Ohio State University	Columbus, Ohio	Inactive	
Eta (First)	1923–1925	Ohio Northern University	Ada, Ohio	Moved	
Theta	1923	Brooklyn College	Brooklyn, New York	Inactive	
Iota (First) (see Rho)	1923–1934	Fordham University	New York City, New York	Moved	
Eta (Second)	1925	Rutgers College of Pharmacy	Newark, New Jersey	Inactive	
Kappa	1923	University of Southern California	Los Angeles, California	Inactive	
Lambda	1925	University of California, San Francisco	San Francisco, California	Inactive	
Mu	1926	University of Connecticut	Storrs, Connecticut	Inactive	
Nu	1926	University of Toronto	Toronto, Ontario, Canada	Inactive	
Xi	1928	Wayne State University	Detroit, Michigan	Inactive	
Omicron	1929–19xx ?	North Pacific College of Pharmacy	Portland, Oregon	Inactive	
Iota (Second)	1934	St. John's College of Pharmacy	Brooklyn, New York	Inactive	
Pi	1938	St. Louis College of Pharmacy	St. Louis, Missouri	Inactive	
Rho (see Iota First)	1939	Fordham University	New York City, New York	Inactive	
Beta Galen	1952	University of the Sciences in Philadelphia	Philadelphia, Pennsylvania	Inactive	
Gamma Galen	1952	Temple University	Philadelphia, Pennsylvania	Inactive	
Sigma	1956	University of Florida College of Pharmacy	Gainesville, Florida	Inactive	
Tau (First)	1957–1962	University of New England School of Pharmacy	Portland, Maine	Moved	
**Delta Kappa Sigma**	1958	University of Illinois Chicago	Chicago, Illinois	Inactive	
Tau (Second	1962	Northeastern University	Boston, Massachusetts	Inactive	
Phi Alpha	1968	University of Maryland School of Pharmacy	Baltimore, Maryland	Inactive	
Upsilon Tau	1984	University of Toledo College of Pharmacy	Toledo, Ohio	Inactive	
Sigma Epsilon	1988	Nova Southeastern University College of Pharmacy	Miami, Florida	Inactive	
**Gamma Gamma Rho**		Midwestern University	Downers Grove, Illinois	Active	
**Lambda Sigma Delta**	1992	University of the Pacific	Stockton, California	Active	
**Upsilon Lambda**	2011	California Northstate University College of Pharmacy	Sacramento, California	Active	

== Notable members ==
- Bernard Marcus (Eta Second), co-founder of The Home Depot

== See also ==
- List of Jewish fraternities and sororities
- Professional fraternities and sororities
- Rho Chi, co-ed, pharmacy honor society
