= Alpha Zeta Omega =

American professional fraternity

- ΑΖΩ
- Founded: December 19, 1919; 106 years ago Philadelphia College of Pharmacy
- Type: Professional
- Affiliation: Independent
- Status: Active
- Emphasis: Pharmacy
- Scope: National (United States)
- Colors: Blue and White
- Publication: AZOan
- Chapters: 42
- Nickname: AZO, Dead Men's Club
- Headquarters: Yorktown Heights, New York; United States
- Website: www.azo.org/

Alpha Zeta Omega (ΑΖΩ or AZO) is an American co-ed, pharmaceutical professional fraternity founded on December 19, 1919. It was originally known as the Dead Men's Club.

== History ==
=== Origins ===
Alpha Zeta Omega was founded in Philadelphia, at the Philadelphia College of Pharmacy and Science, which is now called the University of the Sciences in Philadelphia. The leader and originator of this group was Ephraim G. Sless. The original members (also known as fraters) were:

- Harry Althouse
- Lawrence Rosenfeld
- Morris Arkans
- Abe M. Bernstein
- David Champaine
- David L. Dyen
- Stanley Rosenfeld
- Al Rosenfield
- Louis Snyder
- David Schwartz
- Morris Shuman
- Ephraim G. Sless
- Joshua Zimskind

These eleven men secretly started a pharmaceutical fraternity they dubbed the Dead Men's Club. Soon after its founding, Harry Althouse was added, and as its members then numbered twelve, the group was often referred to as "The Dozen". Later, Dr. Lawrence Rosenfeld, an eminent Philadelphia bacteriologist, also became a member, but the name of "The Dozen" persisted. Because of strenuous opposition to the formation of new organizations at the Philadelphia College of Pharmacy and Science by older fraternities and clubs, the newly formed Dead Men's Club would exist as a secret society for several years.

Alpha Zeta Omega was formed for academic support; the original stated goal was to ensure 100% graduation of its members. Members participated in a structured series of quizzes, designed and executed by the members most proficient in the particular subject under discussion. These frequent study sessions resulted in bringing together the social life of the members. In 1921, the Dead Men's Club boasted 100% graduation of its thirteen members. In addition to the original goal of "100% graduation" the purpose of the Fraternity is now designated chiefly as "to spread the spirit of Fraternalism, Brotherly Love, Friendship and Good Will towards Mankind."

The original constitution of AZO was drawn up by A.M. Bernstein and D.L. Dyen. Stanley Rosenfeld was elected the first "Supreme Directorum" (President) of the fraternity. The original thirteen members termed themselves the Alpha chapter. The Supreme chapter, consisting of the Supreme Officer and delegates from subordinate chapters, meets regularly twice a year in January and July. As the fraternity began to grow in its early years, it became necessary to hold a yearly convention. The first such affair took place at the Hotel Walton, Philadelphia in June 1922, with E. Fullerton Cook, chairman of the Pharmacopoeia Revision Committee, as guest and toastmaster.

After the Dead Men's Club founding members graduated, the group held its first official gathering at the home of Abe M. Bernstein. It was at this time decided to change the name of the organization to Alpha Zeta Omega Fraternity. In 1922, Alpha Zeta Omega Fraternity Supreme Chapter was officially incorporated under the laws of the State of Pennsylvania. The fraternity's yearly publication, Hazy-O, started in December 1922 and was edited by Si Sless.

At the 1925 Convention in Newark, NJ, the Philadelphia alumni chapter was chartered, which nullified the charter of the Alpha chapter. The Alpha fraters then became the charter members of the Philadelphia alumni chapter.

In 1937, the Ohio River Floods caused considerable damage to pharmacies owned by several members. An emergency session of the fraternity was called and a support drive was held to assist those members' businesses that were damaged or destroyed in the flood. In 1938, plans to offer insurance to the members of the fraternity were adopted, and when finalized, $100,000 worth of insurance was written.

In 1939, a Ladies Auxiliaries was established at several chapters for the wives of AZO fraters. At the Detroit Convention in 1940, a National Auxiliary was founded.

In 1961, the book 40 Years of AZO was published, detailing the history of AZO. Additional historical publications would follow, outlining the history of AZO from 1960 to 1970, and then again from 1970 to 1980. In the early 1970s, AZO began admitting women as members for the first time and thus became a co-ed fraternal organization.

== Symbols ==
The Greek letters AZO were chosen to represent:

- Alpha—the first letter in the Greek alphabet, representing the beginning of time
- Zeta—a mnemonic of the founder's names, a symbol of the link between the creation and eternity
- Omega—the last letter of the Greek alphabet, was taken to represent the end of time.

The fraternity's pin was designed by A. M. Bernstein, D. L. Dyen, M. Shuman, and E. G. Sless. The fraternity's shield and recognition pin was approved in 1924.

== Activities ==
=== Conventions ===
Currently, two meetings are held each year—a National Convention in July and a Regional Convention in January. The AZOan is the fraternity's yearly publication. Its quarterly newsletter is AZO Apothecary.

=== Awards ===
The fraternity has numerous awards. The Directorum's Cup was established in June 1926 and is awarded annually to a subordinate chapter for its excellent standing. The Newspaper Cup is awarded to subordinate chapters for chapter publications. The Meritorious Award is presented to a member for "long and distinguished activity on behalf of the fraternity". The Supreme Undergraduate Award is given to exceptional undergraduates annually at conventions. The S. I. Sless Award is presented to an undergraduate member for undergraduate service to the fraternity. The E. G. Sless Award is given to a member for long and distinguished service to the fraternity on the chapter level. The Achievement Medal is presented to a person (not necessarily a member) for "long and meritorious service to the Profession of Pharmacy". The Order of the Double Star is awarded to members "who attain positions of respect and importance within the Profession of Pharmacy".

=== Charity ===
In June 1946, AZO presented funds for the pharmacy of the Hadassah Memorial Hospital in Mandatory Palestine. This was part of the $15,000 pledged by the fraternity to build a pharmacy building at the hospital. In 1956, AZO took on as its cultural program, the task of raising money for the Hebrew University in Israel. The stated goal was to raise $100,000 in three years. The fraternity surpassed its goal and raised $103,000 in just two years.

In 1976, the founder of AZO, Ephraim G. Sless, died. In honor of their late founder, the membership began a campaign to establish scholarships across the United States and in Israel.

After the events of September 11, 2001, AZO started a project to benefit the Dean Street Heroes Fund, N.Y. Fire Dept., Engine Co. 219. After the devastation caused by Hurricane Maria to Puerto Rico, where one of AZO's chapters resides, a project was started to benefit the rebuilding of the territory.

== Governance ==
The fraternity is organized by chapters, each representing a specific pharmacy school or geographic area. Chapters may be formed by undergraduates and alumni, and in some instances are mixed, containing both undergraduate and graduate members.

The government has alternative names for their officers which follow:

- Directorum - President
- Sub-Directorum - Vice President
- Signare - Secretary
- ExCheque - Treasurer
- Bellarum - Sergeant of Arms

== Chapters ==
=== Collegiate chapters ===
Following is a list of the undergraduate chapters of Alpha Zeta Omega. Active chapters are indicated in bold. Inactive chapters are in italics.

Chapter	Charter date and range	Institution	Location	Status	Ref.
Alpha (First)	December 19, 1919 – 1925	Philadelphia College of Pharmacy and Science	Philadelphia, Pennsylvania	Inactive	(Note: Became the Philadelphia Alumni chapter.)
Beta	1925	Philadelphia College of Pharmacy	Philadelphia, Pennsylvania	Inactive	(Note: This is a mixed chapter that includes undergraduate and alumni members.)
Gamma	1921	Temple University	Philadelphia, Pennsylvania	Inactive	
Delta		McGill University	Montreal, Quebec	Inactive	
**Epsilon**	1923	Rutgers University Ernest Mario School of Pharmacy	Piscataway, New Jersey	Active	(Note: Chapter was formed at Rutgers Newark)
Zeta		Columbia University	New York City, New York	Inactive	
Eta	1924	University of Cincinnati	Cincinnati, Ohio	Inactive	
Theta (First)		Case Western Reserve University	Cleveland, Ohio	Inactive	
Iota		Arnold and Marie Schwartz College of Pharmacy	Long Island, New York	Inactive	
Kappa	1923	University of Maryland School of Pharmacy	Baltimore, Maryland	Inactive	
Lambda	1947–January 2016	University of Louisville	Louisville, Kentucky	Inactive	
Mu		University of Pittsburgh	Pittsburgh, Pennsylvania	Inactive	
**Nu**	1928	University of Connecticut	Storrs, Connecticut	Active	
Xi	1929	Fordham University	Bronx, New York	Inactive	
Omicron	1930	Detroit Institute of Technology	Detroit, Michigan	Inactive	
Pi	1931	George Washington University and Howard University	Washington, D.C.	Inactive	
**Rho**	1942	St. Louis College of Pharmacy	St. Louis, Missouri.	Active	
**Sigma**	1950	University of Toledo College of Pharmacy and Pharmaceutical Sciences	Toledo, Ohio	Active	
**Tau**	1950	Massachusetts College of Pharmacy and Health Sciences	Boston, Massachusetts	Active	(Note: Chapter formed at the Hampden College of Pharmacy.)
Upsilon	1950	Northeastern University	Boston, Massachusetts	Inactive	(Note: Chapter formed at the New England College of Pharmacy which became Northeastern University.)
Phi	1951	Wayne State University	Detroit, Michigan	Inactive	
**Psi**		Nova Southeastern University College of Pharmacy	West Palm Beach, Florida	Active	
Omega	1960	Hebrew University of Jerusalem	Jerusalem, Israel	Inactive	
Epsilon Chi		University of Missouri–Kansas City School of Pharmacy	Kansas City, Missouri	Inactive	
Zeta Phi		University of Iowa	Iowa City, Iowa	Inactive	
Eta Upsilon		St. John's University College of Pharmacy	Queens, New York City, New York	Inactive	
Theta Alpha	1952	Ohio Northern University	Ada, Ohio	Inactive	
Theta Beta		Ohio State University	Columbus, Ohio	Inactive	
Nu Mu		University of New Mexico	Albuquerque, New Mexico	Inactive	
Omicron Alpha		Ferris State University College of Pharmacy	Big Rapids, Michigan	Inactive	
Omega Chi	1949	Virginia Commonwealth University School of Pharmacy	Richmond, Virginia	Inactive	(Note: Chapter formed at the Medical College of Virginia which later merged to form VCU.)
**Pi Rho**		University of Puerto Rico College of Pharmacy	San Juan, Puerto Rico	Active	
**Theta Gamma**	201x ?	University of Findlay	Findlay, Ohio	Active	
**Delta Tau**	201x ?	Western New England University College of Pharmacy	Springfield, Massachusetts	Active	
**Lambda Nu**	201x ?	University of New England College of Pharmacy	Portland, Maine	Active	
**Psi Beta**	201x ?	Nova Southeastern University	San Juan, Puerto Rico	Active	
**Rho Iota**	201x ?	University of Rhode Island	Kingston, Rhode Island	Active	

=== Alumni chapters ===
Following is a list of the alumni chapters of Alpha Zeta Omega. Active chapters are indicated in bold. Inactive chapters are in italics.

Chapter	Charter date and range	Location	Status	Ref.
Alpha (Second)	1925	Philadelphia, Pennsylvania	Inactive	
**Epsilon**	1923	Piscataway, New Jersey	Active	
**Eta**	1924	Cincinnati, Ohio	Active	(Note: This was previously a mixed chapter, consisting of both undergraduates and alumni.)
Theta (Second)		Cleveland, Ohio	Inactive	
**Kappa**	1923	Baltimore, Maryland	Active	
Lambda	1947 – January 2016	Louisville, Kentucky	Inactive	
Mu	1927	Pittsburgh, Pennsylvania	Inactive	
Nu	1928	Storrs, Connecticut	Inactive	
Pi	1931	Washington, D.C.	Inactive	
Rho	1942	St. Louis, Missouri	Inactive	
Sigma	1950	Toledo, Ohio	Inactive	
**Tau**	1950	Boston, Massachusetts	Active	
Upsilon	1950	Boston, Massachusetts	Inactive	
Phi	1951	Detroit, Michigan	Inactive	
Chi		Los Angeles, California	Inactive	
Psi		Miami, Florida	Inactive	
Beta Alpha		Milwaukee, Wisconsin	Inactive	
Gamma Psi		Phoenix, Arizona	Inactive	
Delta Alpha		Chicago, Illinois	Inactive	
Epsilon Alpha / Western Florida		Tampa, Florida	Inactive	
Omicron Beta / Florida Tri-County		Fort Lauderdale, Florida	Inactive	
Omega Chi	1949	Richmond, Virginia	Inactive	
Theta Gamma		Findlay, Ohio	Inactive	
**Delta Tau**		Springfield, Massachusetts	Active	
Virginia		Norfolk, Virginia	Inactive	
Connecticut		Hartford, Connecticut	Inactive	
Southern Connecticut		Bridgeport, Connecticut	Inactive	
**New York**		New York City, New York	Active	
**AZO Philadelphia**		Philadelphia, Pennsylvania	Active	
**Puerto Rico**		San Juan, Puerto Rico	Active	

== See also ==
- List of Jewish fraternities and sororities
- Professional fraternities and sororities
- Rho Chi, co-ed, pharmacy honor society
