= List of Jewish fraternities and sororities =

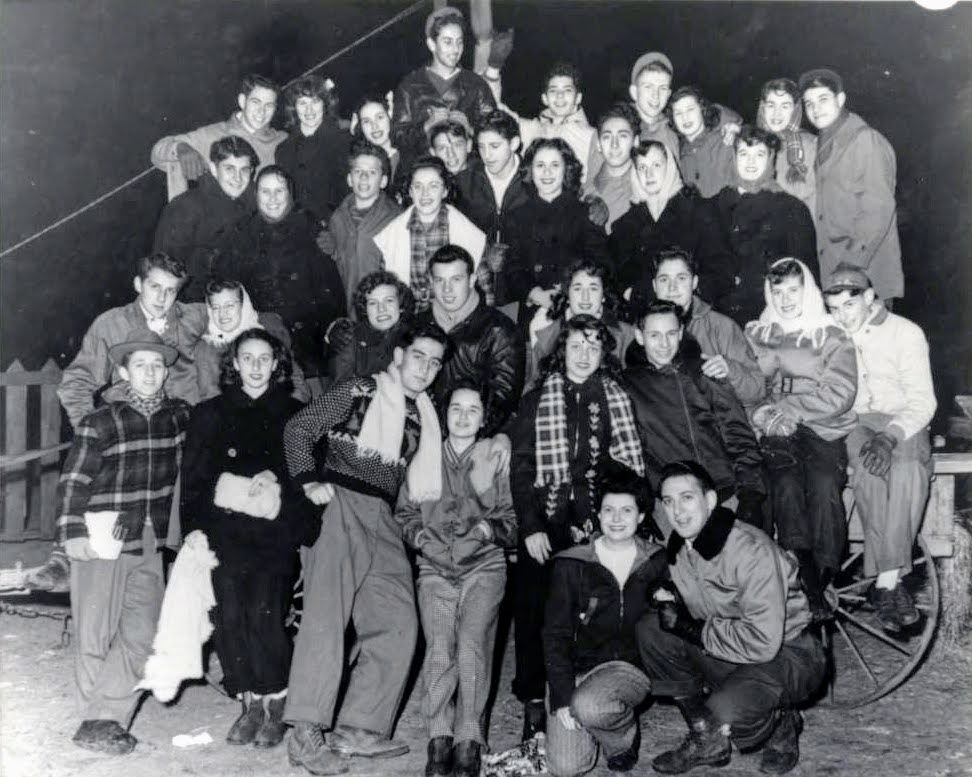
1949 Jewish fraternity and sorority gathering in Minneapolis, Hennepin, Minnesota, U.S.

This is a list of historically Jewish fraternities and sororities in the United States and Canada. These organizations exemplify (or exemplified) a range of "Jewishness"; some are historically Jewish in origin but later became strictly secular. Some remain more celebratory of their Jewish roots from a historical perspective only, and some actively promote Jewish culture and religious traditions within their current program.

The terms "fraternity" and "sorority" are used somewhat interchangeably, with men's and co-ed groups always using "fraternity", and women's groups using either "fraternity" or "sorority". For convenience, the term "Greek letter society" is a generic substitute. The word "Greek" in this case refers to the use of Greek letters for each society's name, and not to Greek ethnicity.

== Collegiate ==
The following list include the larger groups. There were many Jewish local chapters formed at universities around the United States, most of which eventually became a chapter of these larger entities. Bold indicates active groups. Italic indicates dormant groups, or those which merged into another, larger society.

=== Social fraternities ===
Name	Symbols	Charter date and range	Founding location	Affiliation	Scope	Active chapters	Status	Ref.
**Alpha Epsilon Pi**	ΑΕΠ	November 7, 1913	New York University	FFC	International	176	Active	
Alpha Eta Phi	ΑΗΦ	February 22, 1922 – 19xx ?				0	Inactive	
Alpha Mu Sigma	ΑΜΣ	March 1914 – 1963	Cooper Union	Independent	National	0	Merged	
Beta Sigma Rho	ΒΣΡ	October 12, 1910 – 1920	Cornell University	NIC	National	0	Merged	(Note: Started as Beta Samach. The second symbol in the name was Hebrew. Beta Samach changed its name with the chartering of its third chapter, becoming Beta Sigma Rho.) (Note: Merged with Pi Lambda Phi in 1920.)
Hai Resh		November 8, 1908 – 19xx ?				0	Merged	(Note: Merged with Pi Tau Pi.)
Kappa Nu	ΚΝ	November 12, 1911 – 1961	University of Rochester	NIC	National	0	Merged	(Note: Merged with Phi Epsilon Pi in 1961.)
Mu Alpha Delta	ΜΑΔ	1923–19xx ?	City University of New York		National	0	Inactive	
Mu Sigma	ΜΣ	1906–19xx ?				0	Inactive	
Omicron Alpha Tau	ΟΑΤ	1912–1934	Cornell University	NIC	National	0	Merged	(Note: Merged with Tau Delta Phi in 1934.)
Phi Alpha	ΦΑ	October 14, 1914 – 1959	George Washington University	NIC	National	0	Merged	(Note: Merged with Phi Sigma Delta in 1959.)
Phi Beta Delta	ΦΒΔ	1912–1941	Columbia University	NIC	National	0	Merged	(Note: Merged with Pi Lambda Phi in 1941.)
Phi Delta Mu	ΦΔΜ	1920–c. 1935	City University of New York		National	0	Inactive	(Note: Cornell's Zeta chapter merged into Phi Beta Delta in 1935.)
Phi Delta Pi	ΦΔΠ	1899–c. 1955	New York City, New York		National	0	Merged	(Note: Merged with Tau Kappa Epsilon.)
Phi Epsilon Pi	ΦΕΠ	November 13, 1904 – 1970	New York City, New York	NIC	International	0	Merged	(Note: Merged with Zeta Beta Tau in 1970.)
Phi Lambda Delta	ΦΛΔ	1920–19xx ?	Columbia University		Regional	0	Inactive	(Note: Expanded to five chapters.)
Phi Sigma Delta	ΦΣΔ	November 10, 1909 – 1970	Columbia University	NIC	National	0	Merged	(Note: Merged with Zeta Beta Tau in 1970.)
**Pi Lambda Phi**	ΠΛΦ	March 21, 1895	Yale University	NIC	International	44	Active	(Note: Founded as non-sectarian but was predominantly Jewish until the end of World War II.)
Pi Tau Pi	ΠΤΠ	November 9, 1909 – 19xx ?			National	0	Inactive	
**Sigma Alpha Mu**	ΣΑΜ	November 26, 1909	City College of New York	NIC	International	50	Active	(Note: The fraternity dropped its Jewish affiliation and became open to men of all faiths in 1953.)
Sigma Lambda Pi	ΣΛΠ	1915–1932	New York University	Independent	National	0	Merged	(Note: The Rider University chapter of Sigma Lambda Pi retained the former national's name as a local, later adding a second chapter. Both are dormant. Merged with Phi Epsilon Pi.)
Sigma Omega Psi	ΣΩΨ	1914–1940	City College of New York		National	0	Merged	(Note: Three active chapters merged with Alpha Epsilon Pi in 1940.)
Sigma Tau Epsilon	ΣΤΕ	1923–19xx ?			National	0	Inactive	
Sigma Tau Phi	ΣΤΦ	1918–1947	University of Pennsylvania		National	0	Merged	(Note: Originally only admitted Jewish men in the fields of Engineering and Architecture, but changed to all Jewish men after the addition of a second chapter. It merged with Alpha Epsilon Pi in 1947.)
Tau Delta Mu	ΤΔΜ	1920–19xx ?	City University of New York		National	0	Inactive	(Note: Expanded to around ten chapters.)
**Tau Delta Phi**	ΤΔΦ	June 10, 1910	New York City, New York	NIC	National	5	Active	(Note: Tau Delta Phi was the first NIC fraternity to integrate by welcoming all races, creeds, ethnicities, and religions in 1945, and was the first to open membership to include transgender, gender fluid, and non-binary members in February 2021.)
**Tau Epsilon Phi**	ΤΕΦ	October 10, 1910	Columbia University	NIC	International	144	Active	
Tau Sigma Omicron	ΤΣΟ	1917–19xx ?			National	0	Merged	(Note: Seven chapters merged with Alpha Epsilon Pi.)
**Zeta Beta Tau**	ΖΒΤ	December 29, 1898	Jewish Theological Seminary	NIC	International	82	Active	(Note: Originally a Zionist youth society, it became nonsectarian and opened to non-Jewish members in 1954. Considered the first Jewish fraternity.)

=== Social sororities ===
Name	Symbols	Charter date and range	Founding location	Location	Affiliation	Scope	Active chapters	Status	Ref.
**Alpha Epsilon Phi**	ΑΕΦ	October 24, 1909	Barnard College	New York City, New York	NPC	National	50	Active	
**Delta Phi Epsilon**	ΔΦΕ	March 17, 1917	New York University School of Law	New York City, New York	NPC	International	110	Active	(Note: Although their founders were Jewish, Delta Phi Epsilon and Phi Sigma Sigma are historically nonsectarian sororities.)
**Delta Pi**	ΔΠ	November 2, 1989	York University	York, Ontario, Canada	Independent	Regional	4	Active	
Iota Alpha Pi	ΙΑΠ	March 3, 1903– July 1971	New York City Normal College (now Hunter College)	New York City, New York	NPC	International	0	Inactive	
Pi Alpha Tau	ΠΑΤ	May 1917 – c. 1950	Hunter College	New York City, New York	Independent	National	0	Inactive	
**Phi Sigma Sigma**	ΦΣΣ	November 26, 1913	Hunter College	New York City, New York	NPC	National	115	Active	
**Sigma Alpha Epsilon Pi**	ΣΑΕΠ	October 1, 1998	University of California, Davis	Davis, California	Independent	National	12	Active	
**Sigma Delta Tau**	ΣΔΤ	March 25, 1917	Cornell University	Ithaca, New York	NPC	National	64	Active	
**Zeta Beta Omega**	ΖΒΩ	December 3, 2018	University of Toronto, St. George Campus	Toronto, Canada	Independent	Local	1	Active	

== Professional ==
Information on the continuing activity of some of these societies may be missing. Active groups are listed in bold. Inactive groups are listed in italic.

Name	Symbols	Charter date and range	Founding location	Focus	Affiliation	Scope	Active chapters	Status	Notes	Ref.
Alelph Yodh He	איה	1907–1921	Chicago College of Medicine and Surgery	Medical		National	0	Merged		(Note: Merged with Phi Lambda Kappa)
**Alpha Omega**	ΑΩ	December 20, 1907	Baltimore, Maryland	Dental	Independent	International	125	Active		
Alpha Zeta Gamma	ΑΖΓ	1910 – September 17, 1932	Chicago College of Dental Surgery	Dental	Independent	National	0	Merged		(Note: Merged with Alpha Omega.)
**Alpha Zeta Omega**	ΑΖΩ	December 19, 1919	Philadelphia College of Pharmacy and Science	Pharmacy	Independent	National	42	Active	coed	(Note: Originally known as the Dead Men's Club.)
Iota Theta	ΙΘ	1918–19xx ?		Law			0	Inactive		
Kappa Epsilon Phi	ΚΕΦ	1930–19xx ?	Alfred University	Engineering		National	0	Inactive		(Note: The Alfred University chapter was founded in 1930 and became Kappa Nu in 1933. The Ohio State chapter was founded in 1935 and lasted two years.)
Lambda Alpha Phi	ΛΑΦ	1919–19xx ?		Law			0	Inactive		
Lambda Gamma Phi	ΛΓΦ	October 21, 1921 – 19xx ?		Law			0	Inactive		
Lambda Epsilon Xi	ΛΕΞ	1936 or earlier–19xx ?		Law			0	Inactive		
**Lambda Omicron Gamma**	ΛΟΓ	1924		Osteopaths				Active		
Mu Beta Chi	ΜΒΧ	1933–19xx ?		Business			0	Inactive		
Mu Sigma Pi	ΜΣΠ	January 18, 1932 – 19xx ?		Optometrists			0	Inactive		
**Nu Beta Epsilon**	ΝΒΕ	1919	Columbus, Ohio	Law		National	15	Active	coed	
**Phi Delta Epsilon**	ΦΔΕ	1903	Cornell University Medical College	Medical	PFA	International	182	Active	coed	
**Phi Lambda Kappa**	ΦΛΚ	1907	University of Pennsylvania	Medical		International	41	Active	coed	
Phi Sigma Mu	ΦΣΜ	1932–19xx ?	Omaha University Night Law School	Law		Local	0	Inactive		(Note: Not to be confused with the fictional fraternity of the same name, from the movie G.O.A.T.)
**Rho Pi Phi**	ΡΠΦ	January 3, 1919	Massachusetts College of Pharmacy	Pharmacy	PFA	National		Active	coed	
Sigma Epsilon Delta	ΣΕΔ	1901–19xx ?	University of Pennsylvania	Dental		Local	0	Inactive		(Note: Baird's 1923 edition has this as a local at Penn; may have expanded to multiple chapters.)
Sigma Iota Zeta	ΣΙΖ	1933–19xx ?		Veterinarians			0	Inactive		
**Tau Epsilon Rho Law Society**	ΤΕΡ	1921	Western Reserve University School	Law		National		Active		(Note: Tau Epsilon Rho formed in 1921 by the merger of the local Lambda Eta Chi Law Fraternity, established in 1919 at Western Reserve University School of Law, and the local Phi Epsilon Rho, established in 1921 at Ohio State University Law School. Both groups were Jewish law fraternities. It became the Tau Epsilon Rho Law Society in 1985.)

== High school ==
Information on the continuing activity of some of these societies may be missing. Known active groups are listed in bold; dormant groups are listed in italics.

Name	Symbols	Charter date and range	Founding location	Type	Scope	Active chapters	Status	Ref.
**Aleph Zadik Aleph**	אצא	1924	Omaha, Nebraska	Fraternity	International		Active	
**BBG** (BBYO)	בבג	1944	San Francisco, California	Sorority	International		Active	
Hai Resh		July 7, 1907 – 1937		Fraternity	National		Merged	(Note: The fraternity declined when most of its leadership entered World War I. It continued but merged with Pi Tau Pi by 1937.)
Iota Gamma Phi	ΙΓΦ			Sorority		0	Inactive	
Iota Phi	ΙΦ			Sorority	National	0	Inactive	
Phi Beta	ΦΒ	1920–19xx ?		Fraternity	National	0	Inactive	(Note: Not to be confused with the professional fraternity for the creative and performing arts.)
Phi Sigma Beta	ΦΣΒ	June 22, 1910 – 1914	DeWitt Clinton High School	Fraternity		0	Inactive	(Note: Became ΤΔΦ collegiate fraternity in 1914.)
Pi Tau Pi				Fraternity		0	Inactive	
Pi Upsilon Phi	ΠΥΦ			Fraternity	National	0	Inactive	
**Sigma Alpha Rho**	ΣΑΡ	November 18, 1917	West Philadelphia High School	Fraternity	International		Active	
Sigma Theta Pi	ΣΘΠ	1909		Sorority	National	0	Inactive	(Note: Not to be confused with the international sorority with a similar name, Sigma Thêta Pi, founded in 2003, nor the local Christian fraternity at Howard Payne University, founded in 2004.)
Sigma Omega Pi	ΣΩΠ	c. 1950–1970s	Norfolk, Virginia	Sorority		0	Inactive	
Upsilon Lambda Phi	ΥΛΦ	April 5, 1916		Fraternity	International	0	Inactive	(Note: Voted to become nonsectarian in 1966.)

== See also ==
- College fraternities and sororities
- High school fraternities and sororities
- List of Jewish universities and colleges in the United States
- Defunct North American collegiate sororities
- List of social fraternities and sororities
- Cultural interest fraternities and sororities
