= Sigma Tau Phi =

Defunct American collegiate Jewish fraternity

- ΣΤΦ
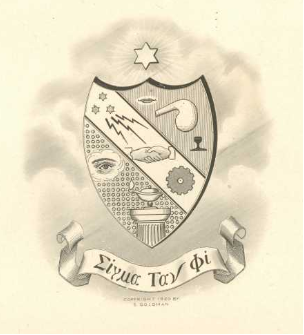
- Founded: 1918; 108 years ago University of Pennsylvania
- Type: Social
- Former affiliation: NIC
- Status: Merged
- Merge date: March 1947
- Successor: Alpha Epsilon Pi
- Scope: Regional
- Colors: Blue and Gold
- Publication: Sigma Tau Phi Record
- Chapters: 7
- Members: 1000+ lifetime
- Headquarters: Philadelphia, Pennsylvania; United States

Sigma Tau Phi (ΣΤΦ) was a historically Jewish collegiate fraternity. It was founded in 1918 at the University of Pennsylvania as a society for engineering and architecture students. Later, it became a social fraternity and a member of the National Interfraternity Conference. It merged into Alpha Epsilon Pi in 1947.

== History ==
Sigma Tau Phi was founded at the University of Pennsylvania in 1918. It was originally a professional fraternity for men studying engineering and architecture. After expanding to University of Cincinnati in 1920, it became a general social fraternity. The fraternity became a junior member of the National Interfraternity Conference in 1930. Its membership in 1945 was 1,000.

The fraternity merged with Alpha Epsilon Pi (AEPi) in March 1947. On March 22, 1947 the Alpha chapter was merged with Gamma chapter of Alpha Epsilon Pi. The Beta chapter became Omicron Deuteron of AEPi, the Gamma colony became Pi Deuteron at chartering, and the Delta chapter became Rho Deuteron. Of the remaining chapters, AEPi agreed to make efforts to reactivate the chapters at Dickinson College and Temple University but not the one at NYU, as there was an active AEPi group there at the time. The Alpha Pi chapter of AEPi established at Temple University in 1956 is considered to be a reactivation of Zeta chapter.

In addition, the Sigma Tau Phi Alumni Clubs in Wilmington, Delaware and Cincinnati, Ohio were granted charters with Alpha Epsilon Pi.

== Symbols ==
Sigma Tau Phi's badge was black enamel with the Greek letters ΣΤΦ set in pearls. Its pledge button was circular, with a gold hollow triangle on a blue background. The fraternity's colors were blue and gold. Its publications were the annual The Sigma Tau Phi Record and the quarterly The News-Dispatch.

== Chapters ==
The chapters of Sigma Tau Phi were:

| Chapter | Charter date and range | Institution | Location | Status | Ref. |
|---|---|---|---|---|---|
| Alpha | 1918 – March 22, 1947 | University of Pennsylvania | Philadelphia, Pennsylvania | Merged (ΑΕΠ) | (Note: Some sources list a charter date of April 1917.) (Note: Chapter merged with the Gamma chapter of Alpha Epsilon Pi.) |
| Beta | 1920–March 1947 | University of Cincinnati | Cincinnati, Ohio | Merged (ΑΕΠ) | (Note: Chapter became the Omicron Deuteron chapter of Alpha Epsilon Pi with the national merger of the two fraternities.) |
| Gamma | 1921–March 1947 | Pennsylvania State University | State College, Pennsylvania | Merged (ΑΕΠ) | (Note: Chapter became the Omicron Deuteron chapter of Alpha Epsilon Pi with the national merger of the two fraternities.) |
| Delta | 1925–March 1947 | University of Delaware | Newark, Delaware | Merged (ΑΕΠ) | (Note: Chapter became the Rho Deuteron chapter of Alpha Epsilon Pi with the national merger of the two fraternities.) |
| Epsilon | 1926–19xx ? | Dickinson College | Carlisle, Pennsylvania | Inactive | |
| Zeta | 1927–19xx ? | Temple University | Philadelphia, Pennsylvania | Inactive | (Note: Chapter was reactivated as the Alpha Pi chapter of Alpha Epsilon Pi in 1956.) |
| Eta | 1929–19xx ? | New York University | New York City, New York | Inactive | |

== See also ==
- List of Jewish fraternities and sororities
