= The Century (apartment building) =

Residential skyscraper in Manhattan, New York

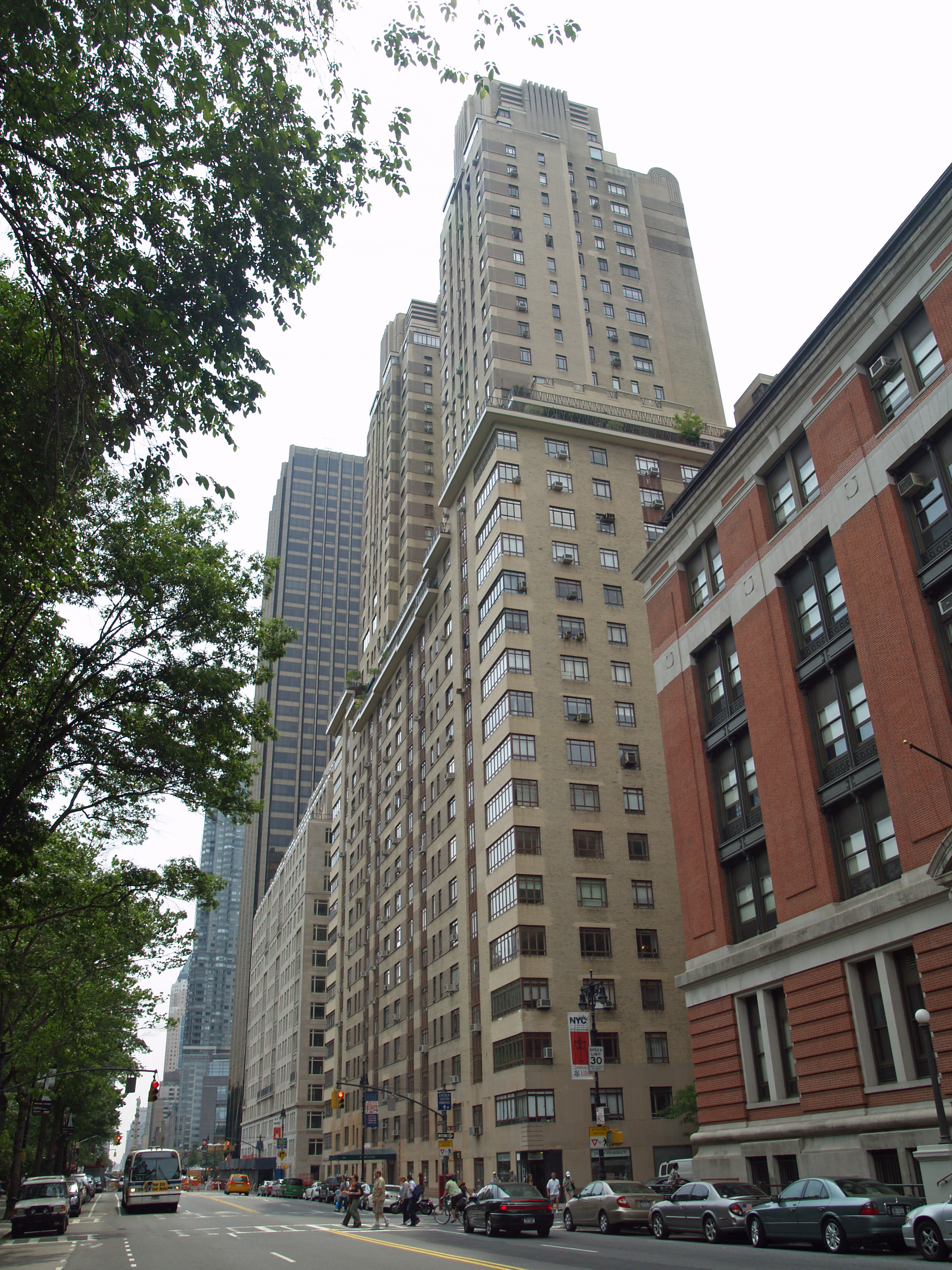
- View from 64th Street and Central Park West
- Alternative names: Century Apartments

General information
- Type: Housing cooperative
- Architectural style: Art Deco
- Location: 25 Central Park West, Manhattan, New York, United States
- Coordinates: 40°46′14″N 73°58′51″W
- Construction started: October 1930
- Completed: December 1931

Height
- Height: 300 ft (91 m)

Technical details
- Structural system: Steel superstructure
- Floor count: 30

Design and construction
- Architects: Irwin S. Chanin, Jacques Delamarre
- Main contractor: Chain Construction Co.
- The Century
- U.S. Historic district – Contributing property
- New York City Landmark
- Part of: Central Park West Historic District (ID82001189)
- NYCL No.: 1517

Significant dates
- Added to NRHP: November 9, 1982
- Designated NYCL: July 9, 1985

The Century is an apartment building at 25 Central Park West, between 62nd and 63rd Streets, adjacent to Central Park on the Upper West Side of Manhattan in New York City, United States. It was constructed from 1930 to 1931 at a cost of $6.5 million and designed by the firm of Irwin S. Chanin in the Art Deco style. The Century is 30 stories tall, with twin towers rising from a 19-story base. The building is a contributing property to the Central Park West Historic District, a National Register of Historic Places–listed district, and is a New York City designated landmark.

The lowest 19 stories surround an interior courtyard to the west, and two towers rise from the eastern portion of the base above that level. There are several cantilevered terraces with Art Deco balustrades. The ground story, and much of the second story, is clad with an ochre-colored stone facade and contains a water table of pink granite. The remainder of the facade is largely made of tan brick, with multi-paned windows, though some portions of the facade are clad with brown brick. There are shallow bow windows on Central Park West, as well as enclosed solariums at the northeast and southeast corners. When the building opened, it operated much like a short-term hotel with housekeeping and catering services, and it had 417 apartments and 1,688 rooms.

The Century was officially completed at the end of December 1931. Numerous entertainment and business tenants have lived in the building over the years, and Irwin Chanin lived in the building for over a half-century. The Century was purchased in 1982 by a consortium that proposed the next year to convert the building into a housing cooperative; the consortium withdrew the plan and a tenant–landlord dispute continued for several years. Most of the building was converted to condominiums in 1989, and the Century remained a luxury residential apartment building through the beginning of the 21st century.

== Site ==
The Century is at 25 Central Park West on the Upper West Side of Manhattan in New York City, United States. The building occupies the western sidewalk of Central Park West (formerly Eighth Avenue) between 62nd Street to the south and 63rd Street to the north. The Century Apartments occupies a rectangular land lot with an area of 50,208 square feet (4,664.5 m^{2}). The land lot has a frontage of 200 feet (61 m) along Central Park West and 250 feet (76 m) each along 62nd and 63rd Streets. 15 Central Park West is immediately to the south, the Society for Ethical Culture School and 5 West 63rd Street are to the north, and Central Park is to the east.

The current apartment building replaced the Century Theatre (originally the New Theatre) at 25 Central Park West. The New Theatre, which had opened in 1909 to designs by Carrère and Hastings, was initially backed by many wealthy New Yorkers but it quickly became unprofitable. The theater had an ornate gray-and-gold interior with carvings and marble surfaces, as well as a large stairway and foyer. While the Century Theatre was architecturally acclaimed, its production history was marked by failures. The theater's original tenant had moved out within two years of the theater's opening, and the theater hosted flops and revivals for most of its history. By the 1920s, high-rise apartment buildings were being developed on Central Park West in anticipation of the construction of the New York City Subway's Eighth Avenue Line.

== Architecture ==
The building was designed and developed by Irwin Chanin, who worked with his firm's architectural director Jacques Delamarre. It is 30 stories tall. The Century Apartments was Chanin's second Art Deco residential building; he also developed the Majestic several blocks north in the same style. The Century, 55 Central Park West, the Majestic, the El Dorado, 241 Central Park West, and the Ardsley constitute a major grouping of Art Deco buildings on Central Park West. The Art Deco structures contrast with the Beaux-Arts buildings that surround them. The modernistic Art Deco design was intended to appeal to "new money" residents, as opposed to the classical designs of the Beresford and the San Remo, where many residents were of "old money" wealth. The Century's original design survives almost in its entirety, except for some modifications to the upper stories.

=== Form ===
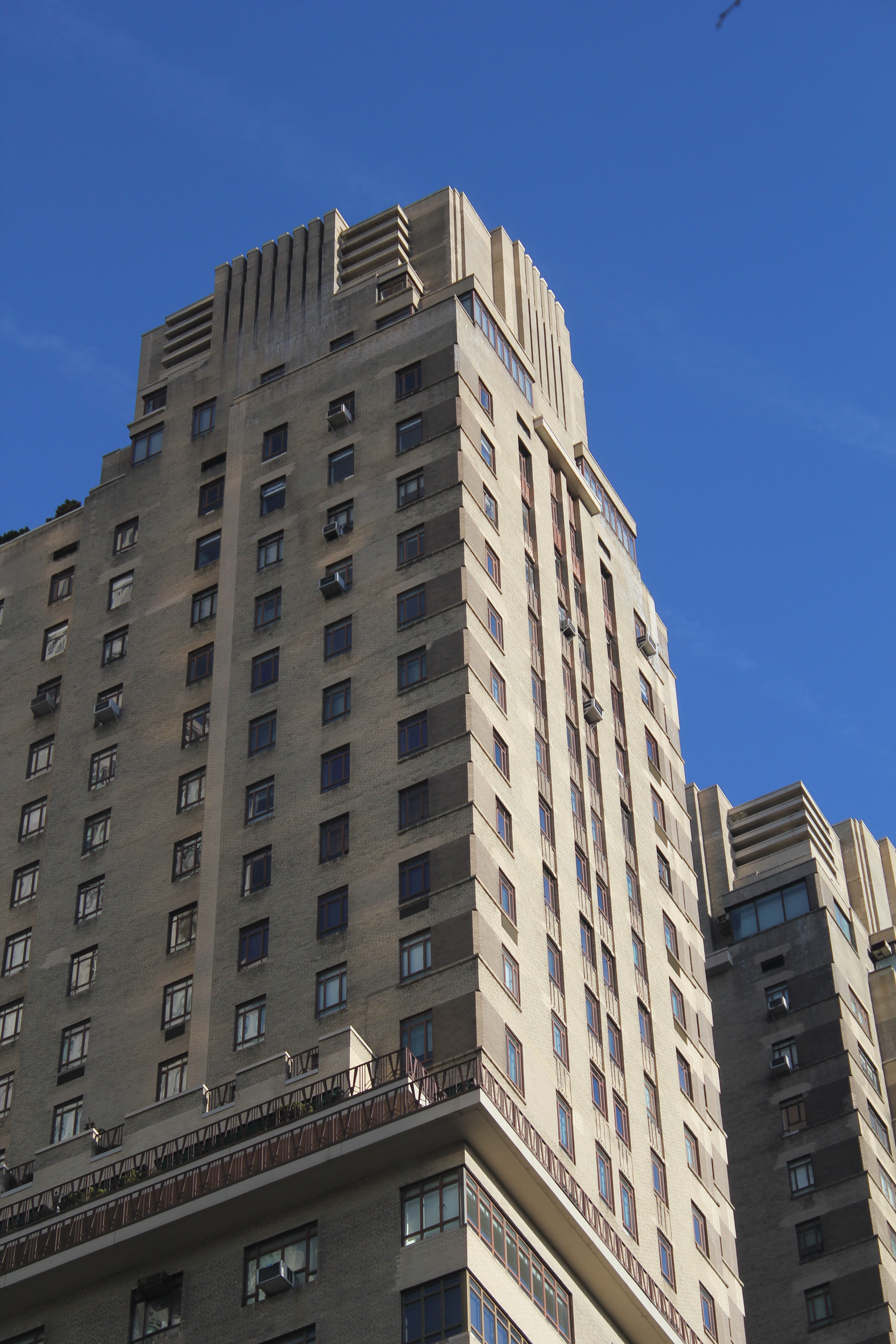
Detail of the top of the building, showing terraces at the setbacks, as well as horizontal and vertical grooves at the crown

At the Century's 19-story base, the building's massing, or shape, fills its lot line on the north, east, and south, and there is an interior courtyard. Two wings on the western section of the site, one each on 62nd and 63rd Street, flank the interior courtyard. The wings step down, as required by the 1916 Zoning Resolution and the Multiple Dwelling Act, and are arranged in four tiers. The inner courtyard measures 80 feet (24 m) wide from west to east. Above the 19th story, two towers rise from the eastern portion of the base. The towers are approximately 300 feet (91 m) tall. The Century is one of four buildings on Central Park West with a twin-towered form; the others are the Majestic, the San Remo, and the El Dorado. (Note: The New York Times also characterizes the Beresford as having twin towers. However, the structure actually has three relatively short, octagonal pinnacles.) By splitting the upper stories into twin towers, as opposed to a single bulky tower, the developers could increase the amount of space that was near a window.

The massing of the Century, and those of similar buildings, was shaped primarily by the Multiple Dwelling Act of 1929. Under this legislation, the "street walls" of apartment buildings could rise one and a half times the width of the adjacent street before they had to set back. On lots of more than 25,000 square feet (2,300 m^{2}), the street walls could rise three times the width of the adjacent street. In practice, this meant that buildings on Central Park West could rise 19 stories before setting back. The legislation also mandated courtyards in large apartment buildings.

=== Facade ===
The ground story contains an ochre facade of stone above a water table of pink granite. Much of the second story, except for the section directly above the main entrance on Central Park West, is also faced in stone. Above the ground story, the building is largely clad with tan brick, which was intended to be similar to the color of limestone. The building contains a limited amount of ornamentation, which is mostly concentrated around major design elements such as the entrances, the setbacks, and the tops of the towers.

==== Lower section ====
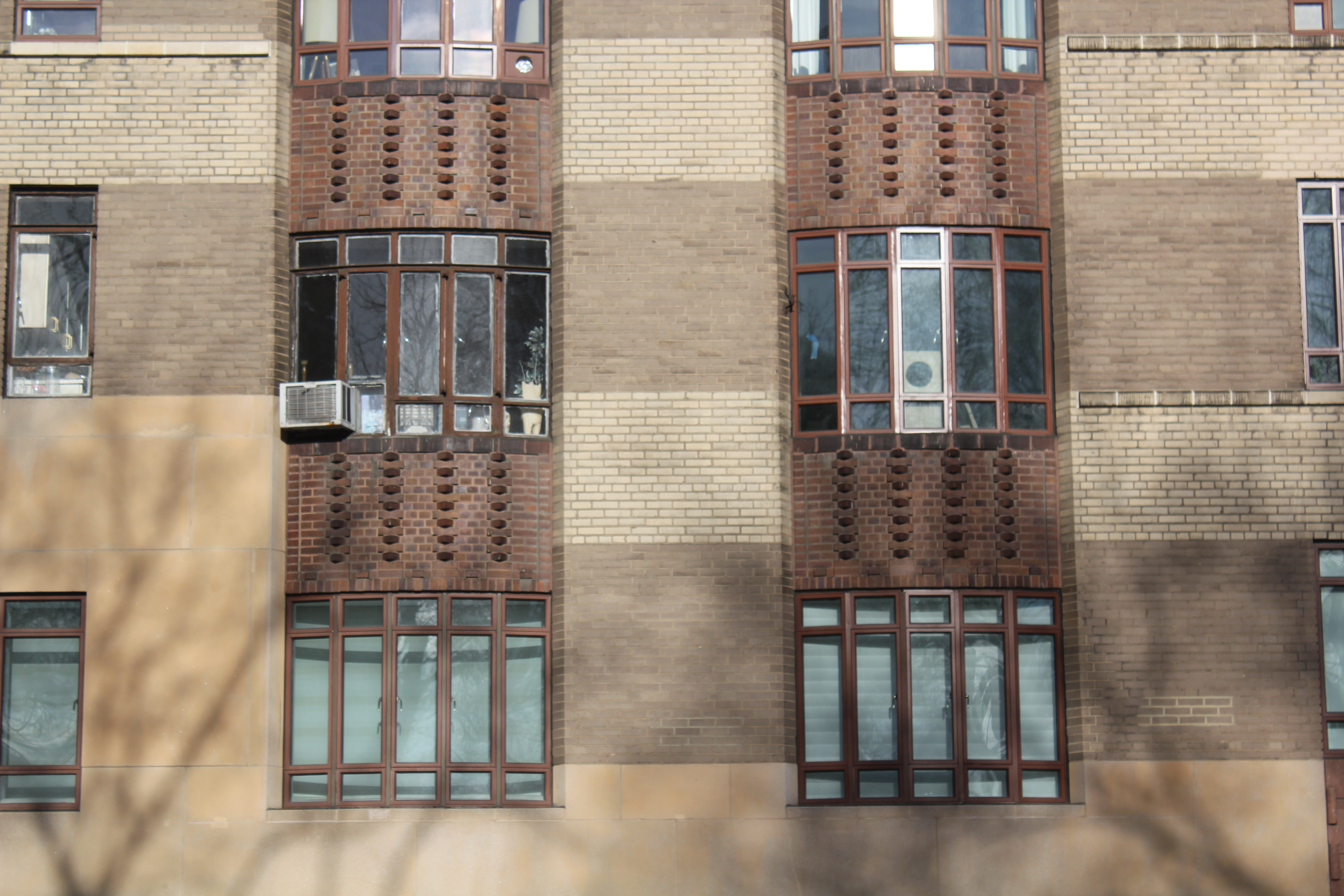
Two bays of bow windows on the second and third stories are visible here. Each window is divided horizontally and vertically by mullions. The windows on different floors are separated horizontally by rust-colored spandrels. Windows on the same floor are separated vertically by panels of darker-brown brick. Below the second-story windows is the stone base.

The main entrance is in the middle of the Central Park West elevation and is surrounded by a pink granite doorway with vertical quoins and horizontal molded blocks. The main doors contain Art Deco grilles made of white metal, surrounded by a metal frame. The rest of the ground story contains doorways to individual ground-floor offices. The southeast and northeast corners of the building contain doorways that lead to storefronts; the doorways are part of the original design, but the storefronts were added after the building opened. The storefront entrance from the southeast corner, facing Central Park West and 62nd Street, is chamfered; the apartments are cantilevered above it.

Above the second story, there are six bays of shallow bow windows on the Central Park West elevation. The six bays are arranged in a 1-2-2-1 pattern, dividing the Central Park West elevation vertically into five "pavilions". Metal mullions divide each bow window vertically into five sections with movable casements. (Note: The bow windows are divided vertically into five sections and horizontally into three sections. The three central panes are movable casement windows, while the two outer panes are stationary. The upper part of each bow window contains a fixed transom, while the lower part contains a jalousie.) The bow windows on different floors are separated horizontally by rust-colored spandrels, which contain angled bricks that roughly correspond with the metal mullions in each window. There are concrete sills beneath each window, as well as brick lintel bands above. The bow windows are slightly below the other windows on each floor, since the living rooms behind them were sunken below the rest of the apartments.

In the three middle pavilions on Central Park West, the windows on each floor are separated vertically by darker brown brick (except for the bow windows on either end of the facade, which are flanked by light brick). On the 2nd through 15th stories, the central pavilion has two double-casement windows on each floor, which share a concrete sill. On the 3rd through 15th stories, the second-from-center pavilions (on either side of the central pavilion) have one double casement window and two single-casement windows on each floor. (Note: The double-casement windows are divided vertically into four sections. The two central panes are movable casements, while the two outer sections are stationary. There are also four transom panes above, as well as jalousie windows below.) The corners of the building are clad entirely in tan brick. The corners are outfitted with windows wrapping around the edge at a 90-degree angle, which Chanin referred to as solariums. (Note: The southeast-corner windows are divided vertically into three panes along the south elevation and eight panes along the east elevation. Likewise, the northeast-corner windows are divided into three panes along the north elevation and eight panes along the east elevation. Except for the outermost panes on the east elevation, all of the panes are movable casements. At both corners, each pane has upper and lower transoms.) The corner windows rise to the 17th story.

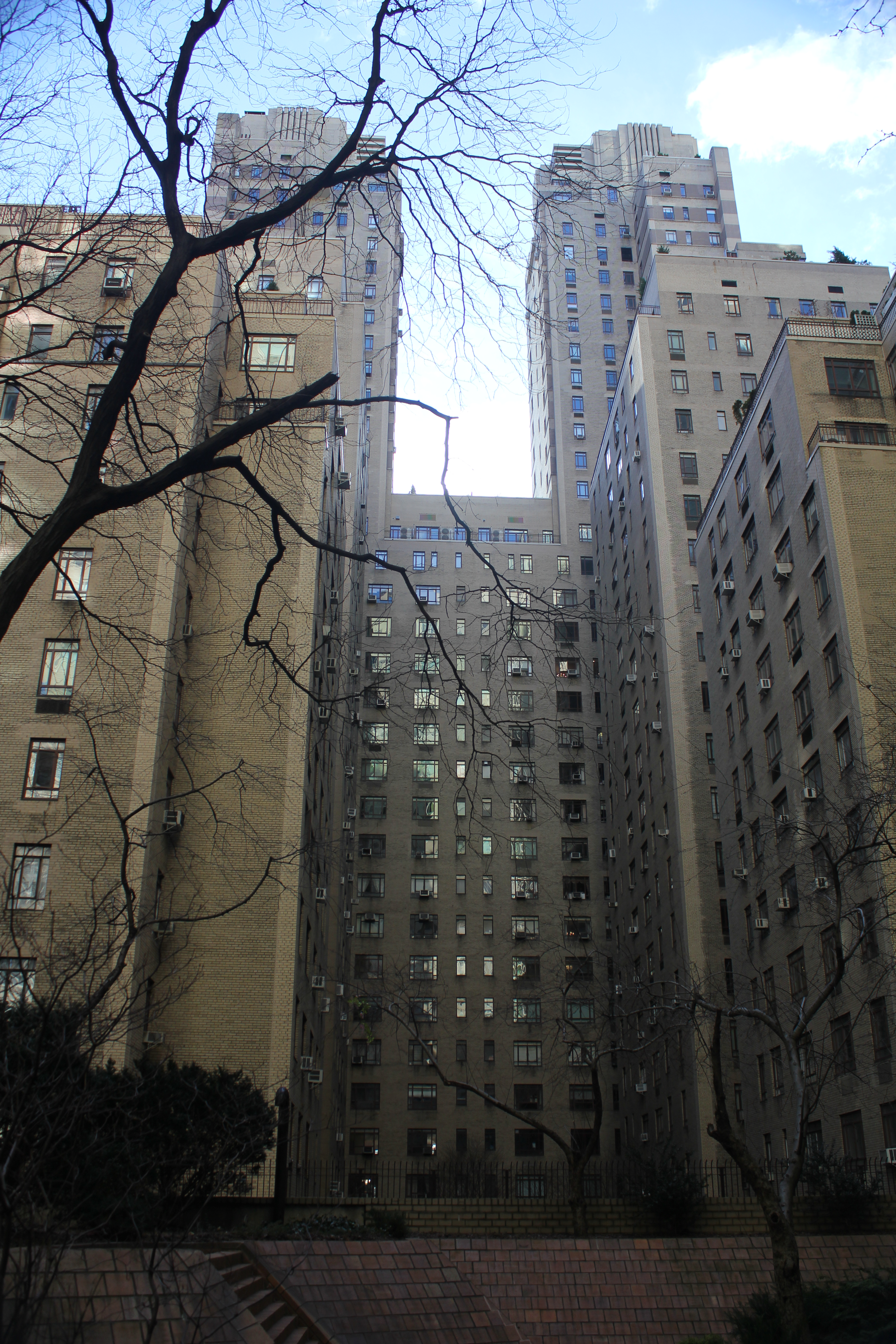
The interior courtyard is visible from an adjacent plaza and is faced in tan brick similar to the rest of the facade.

The 62nd and 63rd Street wings are shorter than the main section of the building. Where the wings step down, the roofline contains cantilevered terraces with Art Deco chevron designs on their balustrades. The 62nd and 63rd Street elevations are largely faced in tan brick. On each elevation, there are three groups of two bays that contain rust-colored brick spandrels. There are secondary entrances to the residential wings on either street. Service entrances with Art Deco designs are placed on the westernmost section of either frontage. The facade of the inner courtyard is visible from a private plaza to the west and is faced in tan brick similar to the rest of the facade. Chanin believed that, since the courtyard and street facades were in the same style, residents would not experience the sensation of living around a dark courtyard.

==== Upper stories ====
The 16th through 19th stories are designed as "transitional stories" and contain cantilevered terraces with Art Deco chevron designs on their balustrades. Above the 19th story rise the towers, which are mostly clad in tan brick. The corners of each tower contain light-brown bands, while the four center windows on each of the towers' elevations contain geometric brick patterns. The windows in the towers are similar to those on the lower floors. On Central Park West, some of the original ornamentation has been removed at the 20th and 21st stories.

Above the 30th story of each of the apartment towers is a water tower with vertical buttresses. There are concrete slabs with vertical grooves on each side of either water tower. The northern tower's northwest corner and the southern tower's southwest corner also contain horizontal grooves. The southern tower's grooves were removed at some point and subsequently restored. Promotional materials for the Century proclaimed: "Towers, roofs and terraces make the building as interesting from the air as from the street".

=== Features ===
When the building opened, it operated much like a short-term hotel with housekeeping and catering services. The Century also had a valet service; a laundry; a private restaurant; and storage spaces for fur, silverware, and jewelry. The vestibules, foyers, and elevator lobbies were decorated in the Art Deco style. The lobby also contained a painting by Frank Stella, which was commissioned in 1970 and installed on the suggestion of Irwin Chanin's daughter Doris Freedman. About 8,500 short tons (7,600 long tons; 7,700 t) of steel was used in the Century's structural frame. The floor slabs were cantilevered from heavy central columns. The cantilevered floor slabs allowed the inclusion of the solariums at each corner, since there were no corner columns like in typical buildings.

As of 2022, according to the New York City Department of City Planning, the Century is divided into 438 ownership condominiums, of which 422 are residential apartments. Upon completion, the Century had 417 apartments and 1,688 rooms. Apartments ranged from one to ten rooms but typically had either three, four, or six rooms each. There were also several duplex units with three rooms. Some of the apartments contained terraces and had one to seven rooms, while corner apartments contained four to seven rooms. Duplex layouts and terraces had previously been common only in the highest-end apartment buildings. At the Century, these features were included to counterbalance the sizes of the living spaces, which were smaller than in older apartment houses. By the 1980s, the building contained 410 apartments, ranging in size from one to eight bedrooms, and 52 of the apartments had large terraces.

Most apartments' living rooms were depressed below the rest of the apartment, and all of these living rooms had fireplaces. Each apartment also had hardwood floors, which Chanin hoped would decrease creaking. On the ground floor are the main lobby and 13 offices.

== History ==
Irwin Chanin was an American architect and real estate developer who designed several Art Deco towers and Broadway theaters. He and his brother Henry designed their first Manhattan buildings in 1924. They then built and operated a number of theaters and other structures related to the entertainment industry, including the Roxy Theatre and the Hotel Lincoln, as well as office buildings such as the Chanin Building. Among the Chanins' Broadway theaters were the Majestic Theatre, the Royale Theatre, and the Theatre Masque. The Century Apartments was the second Art Deco building that Chanin developed on Central Park West, after the Majestic. Both developments were named after the buildings that had formerly occupied their respective sites.

=== Development ===
==== Land acquisition and plans ====
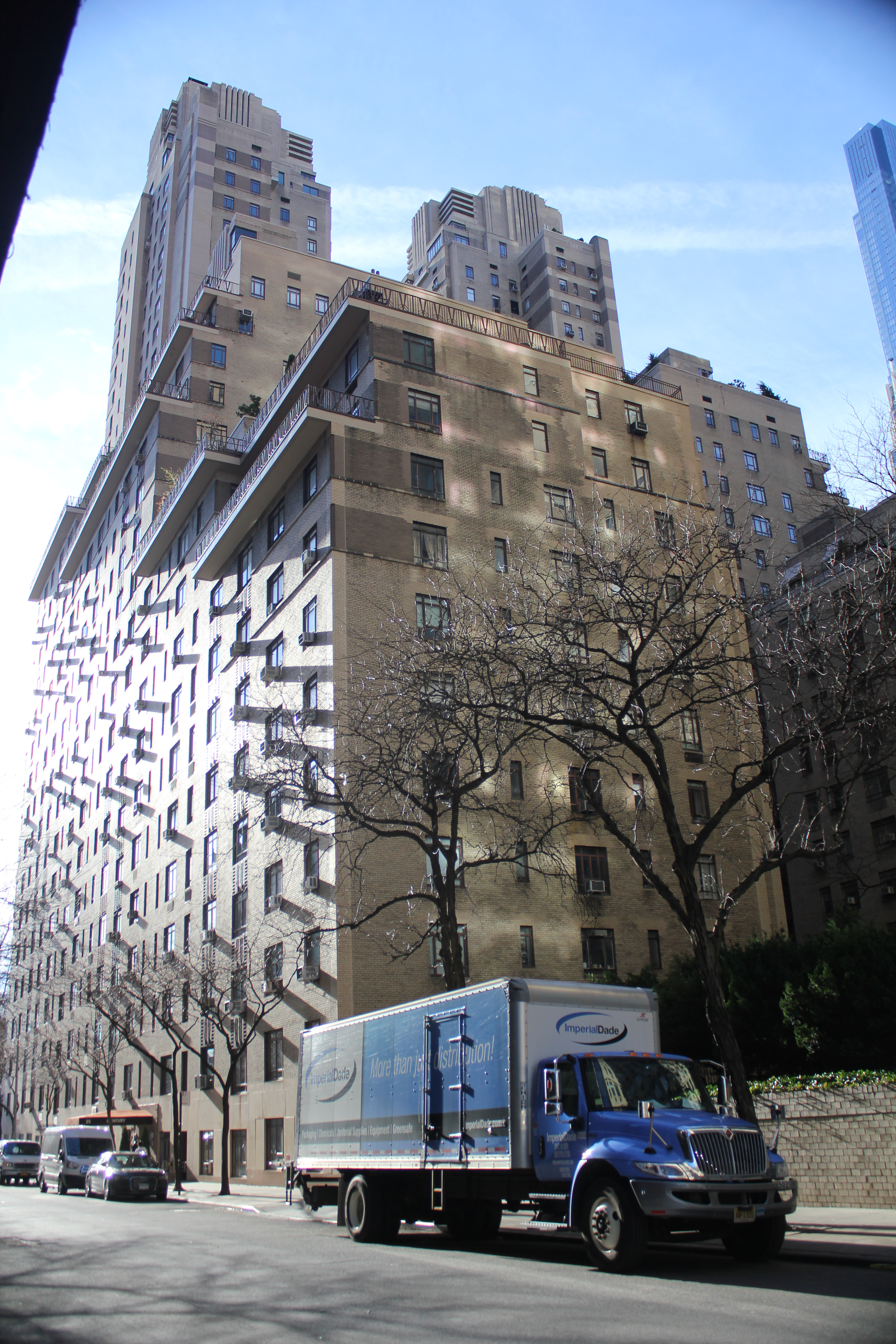
Seen from 63rd Street

Over an eight-month period in 1928 and 1929, the Chanins made contracts to buy the Century Theatre, the Daly's 63rd Street Theatre, an apartment house, and two low-rise buildings for $12 million. This gave them a site of 90,000 square feet (8,400 m^{2}). In May 1929, the Chanin brothers announced plans for a 65-story building on the site at a cost of $50 million. That July, the Shubert brothers bought the Chanin brothers' ownership stakes in the Majestic, Masque, and Royale theaters for a combined $1.8 million. In exchange, the Shuberts agreed to sell a parcel on Broadway between 62nd and 63rd Streets to the Chanins, who thus controlled the entire block.

In August 1929, Irwin Chanin announced that the 65-story building would be developed jointly with a subsidiary of the French government. The skyscraper would have been called the "Palais de France" and would have contained a three-story exhibition space as well as a consulate, tourist bureau, and a French cultural academy, The section of the building along Central Park West would have included a 1,200-room hotel. Above were to be 35 stories of offices, leased out to various companies, including American tenants. The Chanins took title to the land in October 1929 and immediately resold it to the Palais de France Corporation. The project languished for the next year, in the aftermath of the Wall Street Crash of 1929, as no French banks were willing to fund the project.

==== Development as apartment building ====
On October 23, 1930, Irwin Chanin dropped plans to build the Palais de France and started demolishing the Century Theatre. He planned to build a 30-story apartment building on the site. His firm obtained a $6.5 million construction loan from the Metropolitan Life Insurance Company and a $1.25 million second-mortgage bond issue from the Shubert brothers. At the time, it was predicted that the building would be complete within a year. By that November, construction had not started, but Irwin announced that he would hire 3,000 workers to construct the Majestic and Century. In so doing, Irwin planned to take advantage of low material and construction costs. In January 1931, with demolition of the site nearly complete, a time capsule was retrieved from the cornerstone of the Century Theatre.

The Chanin Construction Company constructed the building. Construction of the steel frame began in April 1931. By the end of the next month, the frame had been built to the 15th floor. Within thirty days the entire steel structure was complete. The rapid progress was made possible by "coordination and overlapping of various trades employed", as Irwin Chanin described it. A June 1931 newspaper article reported that the average number of workers since the beginning of construction was 1,050, with up to 1,400 employed at one time. By contrast, Irwin had estimated that an average of 1,500 men would be employed every day for a year.

According to Irwin Chanin, a "vast amount of interior equipment" was required for apartment buildings, particularly in comparison to office buildings. Construction would require over 3 million feet (910,000 m) of electrical wiring, three times what was required for the 56-story Chanin Building. Nonetheless, Irwin predicted that both the Majestic and the Century would be completed on schedule. By September 1931, work on the Century was nearing completion and apartments were already being offered for rent.

=== Completion and mid-20th century ===
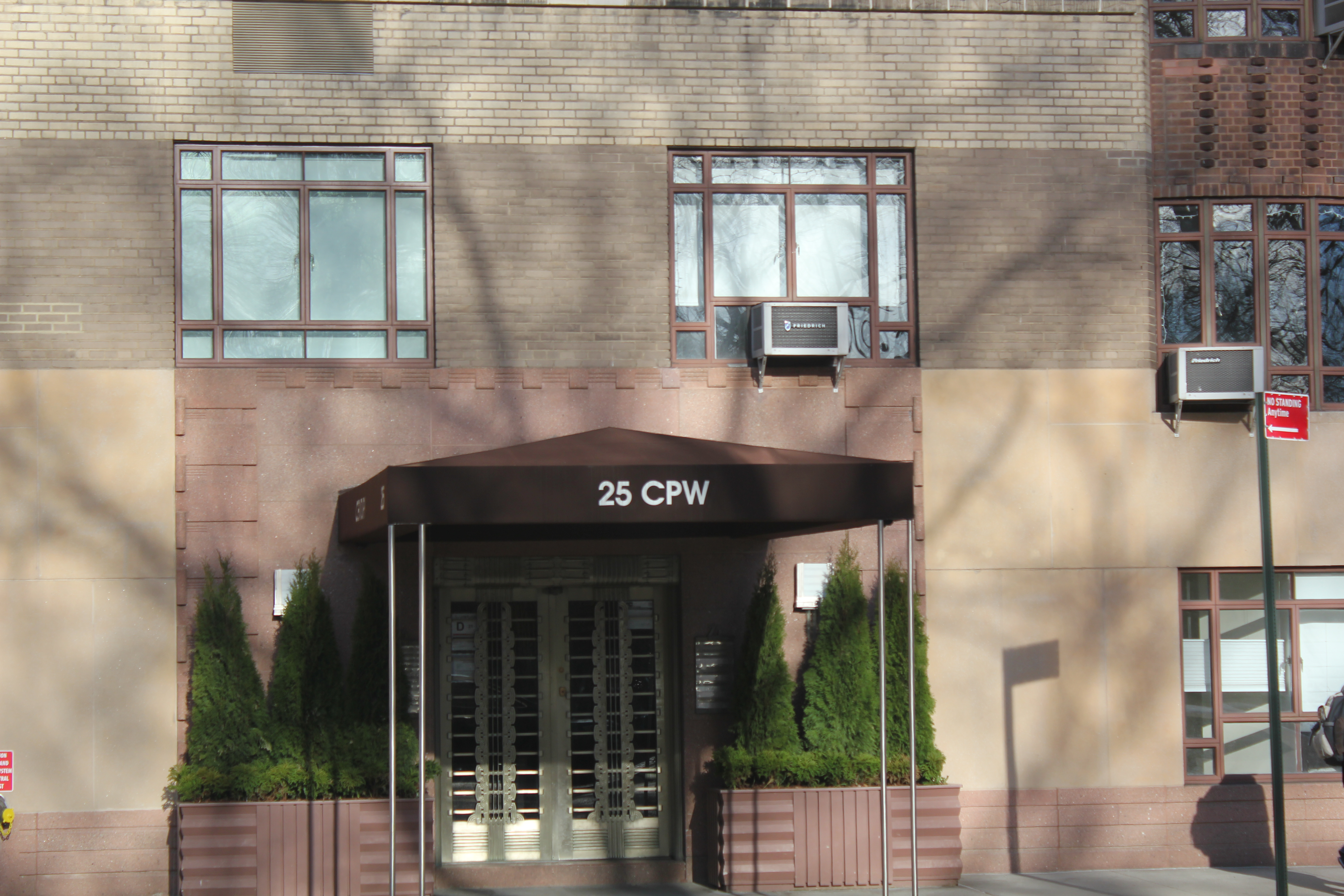
Entrance

The building was officially completed at the end of December 1931. The Century had 417 suites, a little more than double the number at the Majestic, but the buildings had a similar number of rooms: 1,688 at the Century and 1,544 at the Majestic. The apartments at the Century tended to have fewer rooms than those in the Majestic. According to Irwin, this was because larger apartments in the brothers' previous projects had proved to be hard to rent. Mansion Estates Inc., a group headed by Irwin Chanin, transferred the building to Century Apartments Inc. (also headed by Irwin) in May 1932. Century Apartments then secured a $1.35 million mortgage on the property, which was subordinate to Metropolitan Life's first mortgage and the Shuberts' second mortgage.

Henry Chanin was in charge of leasing, and he often leased out multiple apartments at once. The Century soon became popular due to its proximity to the New York City Subway and other modes of transportation. The building's proximity to Central Park, as well as the conversion of Central Park West into a two-way street, were also cited as factors in the high number of tenants. By October 1932, Irwin Chanin said the duplexes, solarium apartments, and the three-to-six-room apartments were being leased quickly. Though Irwin lost control of the building in 1933, he had his own apartment there, which he occupied until his death in 1988.

By 1940, nearly 70 percent of the building's tenants had lived there since shortly after the building opened. One of the storefronts was supposed to have been a bank, but the storefront was left vacant during the Great Depression. Gristedes leased one of the storefronts in 1965 with the intention of opening a supermarket there. The companies that respectively owned the Century, the Chanin Building, and the Nelson Tower, along with the Chanins' longtime lawyer Samuel Kramer, were charged with real estate tax fraud in 1974. The Century's owners were estimated to have evaded $35,730 in real estate taxes.

=== Condo conversion ===
The building was purchased in January 1982 by investment group Century Apartments Associates, in which businessman Daniele Bodini was a partner. The firm paid $36 million and planned to renovate the building. In addition, CAA wished to convert the building into a cooperative and submitted a preliminary co-op offering plan to the New York Attorney General's office. Thirteen months after the purchase, CAA proposed selling the building to the tenants for $110 million. An official of the tenants' association said that they felt residents should be willing to comment on the threats posed by the offering plan. The official pointed out that notices in the lobby, about the popular TV series Nicholas Nickleby, implied that residents "would rather not protect their homes and see 'Nicholas Nickleby' instead". The tenant organization then solicited opinions from tenants, 90 percent of whom were against the co-op plan as originally structured. At the time, all apartments were either vacant or subject to rent regulation; of the non-vacant units, 125 apartments were rent-controlled and 275 apartments were rent-stabilized. (Note: Under New York state law, rent control and stabilization are distinct terms. Rent control limits the price a landlord could charge a tenant for rent, while rent stabilization sets maximum rates for annual rent increases.)

The dispute led to a long-running "kill or be killed relationship" between CAA and the tenants, according to The New York Times, which described relations between the owner and tenants as acrimonious. Some tenants were worried about being evicted, since they could not pay for their apartments; others wanted to keep their rent-stabilized units; and yet others actually supported the plan, as they wanted to sell their apartments. The state attorney general's office vetoed the co-op proposal on the grounds that CAA did not disclose about 140 building-code violations. Subsequently, in mid-1983, some of the tenants sued to place the building into receivership. The building was covered in scaffolding at the time while the facade was being renovated. According to The New York Times, the tenants alleged that there were "crumbling walls both inside and out, vermin infestation, extensive leaks, and virtually everything else that can go wrong with a structure". CAA separately sued the attorney general's office over its rejection of the co-op offering. The tenants failed to secure a receiver for the building, and CAA's lawsuit against the attorney general's office was settled out of court.

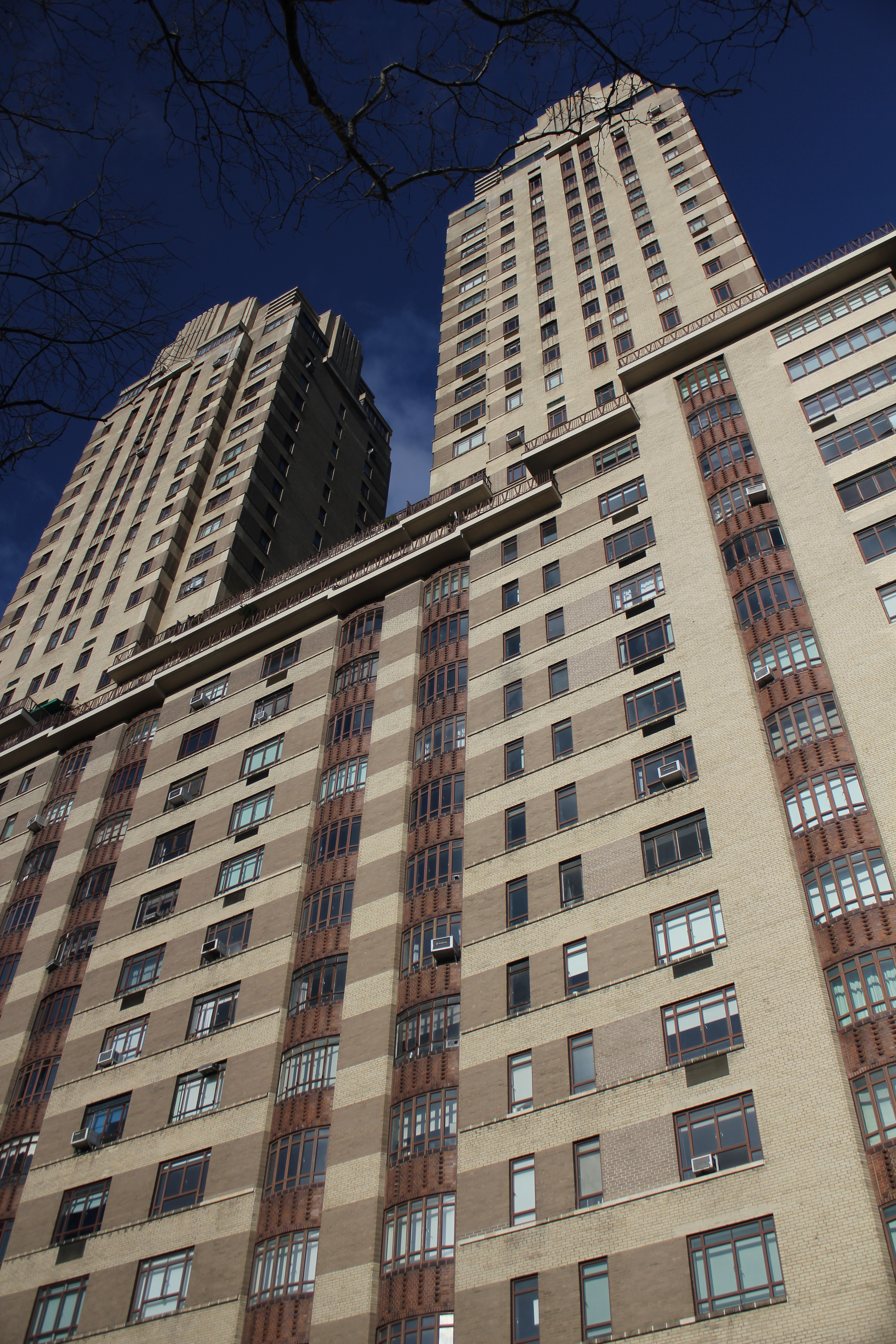
View of the Century from Central Park West

In 1987, CAA proposed converting the building into condominiums. Under the proposal, the conversion would not take effect until at least 45 units had been purchased by tenants who had lived there since 1982. In addition, a reserve fund would be provided for the building. The condominium offering went into effect in February 1989, allowing tenants in 229 of the 410 apartments to purchase their apartments for about one-third or one-half of market rates. Another 117 tenants were protected by a non-eviction plan that enabled them to keep their rent-regulated units. Several condominium owners had sold their individual properties at profits exceeding $1 million. The value of CAA's investment had risen to around $140 million. In an article describing "the Battle of the Century", The New York Times called the dispute "one of the longest, bitterest conversion fights in Manhattan apartment house history".

=== 1990s to present ===
A writer for The Wall Street Journal observed in 1992 that the building was covered in scaffolding and that "one of the period double doors has been replaced by a wooden frame with a dirty piece of glass in it". At that time, Daniele Bodini still owned one-quarter of the Century's units. In the mid-1990s, preservationist and resident Roberta Brandes Gratz raised $600,000 to restore the Century Apartments' lobby to its original appearance. Arthur Simons, a member of the condominium board, expressed his belief that the renovation would be wasteful unless mechanical issues, such as plumbing and electrical wires, were also repaired. The tenants consequently waited until the reserve fund had grown enough to fund a renovation of both the mechanical systems and the lobby, which Simons called "the best of both worlds".

In the 2000s, the Mayflower Apartments across 62nd Street were demolished to make way for the luxury high-rise skyscraper at 15 Central Park West. The Gristedes supermarket at the building's base, which had been operating continuously for 42 years, closed in 2007. Following the completion of 15 Central Park West in the late 2000s, condo prices at the Century began to increase, and some condominiums were placed for sale at rates of more than $3,000 per square foot ($32,000/m^{2}). For example, in 2010, six-bedroom apartments in the Century sold for around $19 million with one bedrooms selling for between $875,000 and $1.675 million. Also in 2010, a bar called the Central Park West Cafe was proposed for the former Gristedes space, prompting opposition from residents. Manhattan Community Board 7 granted a liquor permit for the planned bar, despite concerns that the bar would generate excessive noise.

== Notable residents ==
The Century's proximity to the Theater District of Midtown Manhattan made it attractive to many tenants in the entertainment industry. Notable residents have included:

- Jeff Bezos, founder of Amazon (as a pied-à-terre)
- Leo Buerger, physician
- Henry Busse, orchestra leader
- Jack Dempsey, boxer
- Nanette Fabray, actress
- Doris Chanin Freedman, artist; Irwin Chanin's daughter
- Al Goodman, orchestra leader
- Joe Gould, boxing manager
- Robert Goulet, actor
- Joey Heatherton, actress
- Ted Husing, sportscaster
- Herbert J. Krapp, architect
- Carol Lawrence, actress
- Ethel Merman, actress and singer
- Carmen Miranda, actress
- Graham McNamee, broadcaster
- Tommy Mottola, music executive
- Ernö Rapée, composer
- Laurence Schwab, theatrical producer
- Lee Shubert, theatrical producer
- Robert A. M. Stern, architect
- Malcolm Turnbull, former Australian Prime Minister

== Impact ==
When the building was completed, architectural critic Lewis Mumford regarded the modernist designs of the Century and Majestic apartment buildings as "merely a thin veneer" with their corner windows, terraces, and water towers. According to Mumford, "even the relatively plain facades do not authenticate these structures". Conversely, in 1982, New York Times architectural critic Paul Goldberger called the Century and Majestic "two of the city's most beloved Art Moderne apartment houses". A member of the Art Deco Society of New York described the Century, El Dorado, and Majestic as "distinguished" Art Deco buildings in 1984. According to architectural historian Anthony W. Robins, "The comparison of Chanin's Century and Majestic with Emery Roth's San Remo is stunning."

The architecture of the Century inspired that of at least one other building nearby. The design for what is now Deutsche Bank Center was inspired by those of the Century and the Majestic. In addition, the New York-New York Hotel and Casino on the Las Vegas Strip in Paradise, Nevada, contains a replica of the Century, which at 41 stories is taller than the Century itself. A portion of the New York-New York's interior was also themed to the Century's architecture.

Irwin Chanin lived long enough to see the Century be protected as an official landmark at both the national and municipal levels. The building is a contributing property to the Central Park West Historic District, which was recognized by the U.S. National Register of Historic Places when its nomination was accepted on November 9, 1982. In 1984, the New York City Landmarks Preservation Commission (LPC) hosted hearings to determine whether the Century, Majestic, San Remo, Beresford, and El Dorado should be designated as city landmarks. Manhattan Community Board 7 supported all five designations, and the Century's owners supported designation of their own building. The LPC designated the Century as a city landmark on July 9, 1985, calling the Century a "sophisticated essay in Art Deco design exhibiting a complex balance of horizontal and vertical elements". The Century is also part of the Upper West Side Historic District, which became a New York City historic district in 1990.

== See also ==
- Art Deco architecture of New York City
- List of New York City Designated Landmarks in Manhattan from 59th to 110th Streets
