= Iota Alpha Pi =

Defunct North American collegiate sorority

- ΙΑΠ
- Founded: March 3, 1903; 123 years ago Normal College of the City of New York
- Type: Social
- Former affiliation: NPC
- Status: Defunct
- Emphasis: Jewish
- Scope: National
- Member badge
- Colors: Red and Black
- Symbol: Skull and crossbones
- Flower: Red rose
- Publication: The Heights
- Philanthropy: Muscular Dystrophy
- Chapters: 28
- Headquarters: New York City, State; United States

Iota Alpha Pi (ΙΑΠ) was a North American Jewish college sorority. It was founded in 1903 at the Normal College of the City of New York, now Hunter College, and spread to 28 campuses in the United States and Canada before going inactive in 1971. It was reestablished at Hunter College in 2023, but was suspended by the college a year later.

== History ==
Iota Alpha Pi was the first national sorority for Jewish women. On March 3, 1903, on the campus of New York City, Normal College (now Hunter College), seven young women created a new sorority which they called the J.A.P. club, or "Jay-ay-peez", focused on religious education and settlement house work. The founders were Hannah (Finkelstein) Swick, Olga (Edelstein) Ecker, Sadie (April) Glotzer, Rose (Posner) Bernstein, Rose (Delson) Hirschman, May (Finkelstein) Spielgel, and Frances (Zellermayer) Delson. Zellermayer was a sister to Zeta Beta Tau founder Maurice Zellermayer.

In 1913, with the new name Iota Alpha Pi, the members began the traditional sorority expansion process. The original organizers grouped themselves as the Alpha chapter, and the succeeding group became the Beta chapter. Early expansion was at other schools in the New York Area, Gamma at the Brooklyn Law School, Delta at NYU Washington Square and Epsilon at the New Jersey Law School The sorority became international in 1929 with the founding of Kappa chapter at University of Toronto, University of Manitoba had a particularly prosperous chapter.

In 1924, a Rotation Scholarship Fund was created, allowing money to be loaned to worthy students by the sorority on the expectation of it being repaid. In 1925, the sorority began creating its own semi-annual bulletin. Iota joined the National Panhellenic Conference as an associate member in November 1953 and became a full member on November 4, 1957. Although many chapters were planned, Iota Alpha Pi could not keep up with its rapidly growing competitors.

Historian Marianne Sanua notes, that Iota Alpha Pi "not for the especially popular, affluent, or snobbish, but just a group of good friends". The American Jewish Yearbook 5692 describes the sorority as Jewish in a positive way".

By 1966, Iota Alpha Pi had granted a total of 23 charters. A report by Wilson Heller indicates that the sorority was strong until 1968. Its national philanthropy was muscular dystrophy. Heller posits that the sorority saw dramatic declines in membership, particularly with the cessation of the "Christians only" clause in non-Jewish organizations. As of June 1, 1967, a National Panhellenic Conference report indicated that Iota Alpha Pi had eleven chapters, eight alumnae groups, and 5,802 sisters and thirteen chapters, eight alumnae groups, and 6,204 members as of June 1, 1969.

In 1969, Iota Alpha Pi established new chapters at the University of Maryland College Park and Hunter College Park Avenue. In July 1971, the international headquarters voted to disband Iota Alpha Pi. Two chapters went on to affiliate with other national sororities. The Beta Alpha chapter at Penn State joined Alpha Epsilon Phi, while the Upsilon chapter at Rider University eventually affiliated with Delta Phi Epsilon.

As of 2008, some alumnae continue to hold reunions and other events. However, no formal organization exists to coordinate these gatherings. In October 2023, Barbara Cardarelli and Cheyanne Weiner re-established Iota Alpha Pi's Alpha chapter at Hunter College with the support of alumnae from multiple chapters.

== Symbols ==
The original name of the sorority was J.A.P. Their bi-annual publication was The J.A.P. Bulletin. With the name change to Iota Alpha Pi, the magazine was renamed The Heights.

The first official badge was a scarlet horizontal diamond surrounded by seed pearls, with the Greek letters "ΙΑΠ" in gold. Above the "Α", in gold, was a skull and crossbones. Later versions of the badge included two full-blown roses at the points of the diamond.

Iota Alpha Pi's colors were red and black. As of 1931, the sorority used in " a diamond of scarlet surrounded by jewels" where a crest would otherwise be used. Its flower was a red rose; each new member is given a rose at the end of the installation ceremony.

== Chapters ==
Chapters of Iota Alpha Pi include the following, with active chapters indicated in bold and inactive chapters and institutions are in italics.

| Name | Charter date and range | Institution | Location | Status | Ref. |
|---|---|---|---|---|---|
| Alpha | March 3, 1903 – 1913 | Normal College of the City of New York | New York City, New York | Consolidated | (Note: Combined with Beta chapter in 1913.) (Note: Today's Hunter College is a product of several mergers. The Normal College and Hunter College, for a time, appear to have operated units under the same administration. When these merged, the chapters merged.) |
| Beta | 1913–1965; October 2023 – November 2024 | Hunter College | New York City, New York | Inactive | (Note: Absorbed Alpha chapter in 1913.) |
| Gamma | 1913–1941 ? | Brooklyn Law School | New York City, New York | Inactive | (Note: By 1969, Brooklyn Law School no longer had a chapter, although the date of disbanding is uncertain.) |
| Delta | 1922–1971 | New York University Washington Square | New York City, New York | Inactive | |
| Epsilon | 1922–1942, 1946–1947 | Rutgers Law School | Newark, New Jersey | Withdrew (ΗΝΤ) | (Note: Absorbed local sorority ΓΓΓ in 1938. Withdrew to become Eta Nu Tau (local) in 1947.) |
| Zeta | February 27, 1926 – 1971 | Adelphi University | Garden City, New York | Inactive | |
| Eta | April 17, 1927 – 1942 | University of Denver | Denver, Colorado | Inactive | |
| Theta | | | | Unassigned ? | |
| Kappa | 1929–1956 | University of Toronto | Toronto, Ontario, Canada | Inactive | |
| Iota | 1930–1970 | Long Island University Brooklyn | Brooklyn, New York | Inactive | |
| Lambda | 1931–1971 | Brooklyn College | Brooklyn, New York | Inactive | |
| Mu | March 27, 1932 – 1965 | University of Manitoba | Winnipeg, Manitoba, Canada | Inactive | (Note: Originated as Theta Gamma Phi (local).) |
| Nu | October 12, 1935 – 1971 | Wayne State University | Detroit, Michigan | Inactive | |
| Xi | | | | Unassigned ? | |
| Omicron | 1938–1971 | Queens College, City University of New York | Queens, New York | Inactive | (Note: Originated as Pi Kappa Epsilon (local) in 1941.) |
| Pi | December 13, 1942 – 1971 | Syracuse University | Syracuse, New York | Inactive | |
| Rho | February 1946–1956 | Miami University | Oxford, Ohio | Inactive | |
| Sigma | February 1946 – 1971 | Temple University | Philadelphia, Pennsylvania | Inactive | (Note: Originated as Rho Lambda Phi (local) in 1931.) |
| Tau | | | | Unassigned | |
| Upsilon | 1947–1955 | Rider University | Lawrence Township, New Jersey | Withdrew (ΔΦΕ) | (Note: This chapter originated as Pi Eta Sigma (local) in 1925. Withdrew to reform as a local, and in 1962 became the Delta Sigma chapter of Delta Phi Epsilon.) |
| Phi | October 17, 1954 – 1971 | University of Illinois Urbana-Champaign | Champaign, Illinois | Inactive | |
| Chi | | | | Unassigned | |
| Psi | June 1961 – 1965 | New York University-University Heights | New York City, New York | Inactive | |
| Omega | | | | Unassigned | |
| Beta Alpha | May 5, 1962 – 1971 | Pennsylvania State University | University Park, Pennsylvania | Withdrew (ΑΕΦ) | (Note: Merged into the existing Alpha Zeta chapter of Alpha Epsilon Phi.) |
| Beta Beta | 1965–1971 | City College of New York | New York City, New York | Inactive | |
| Beta Gamma | | | | Unassigned | |
| Beta Delta | May 21, 1966 – 1971 | Cornell University | Ithaca, New York | Inactive | |
| Beta Epsilon | 1966–1970 | C.W. Post College | Brookville, New York | Inactive | |
| Beta Zeta | | | | Unassigned | |
| Beta Eta | 1969–19xx ? | University of Maryland, College Park | College Park, Maryland | Inactive | |

== Conventions ==
Conventions include:

- December 22–27, 1925, New York City
- December 20–25, 1926, New York City
- December 20–25, 1927, New York City
- December 20–25, 1929, New York City
- December 20–25, 1930, New York City
- December 20–25, 1931, New York City
- December 20–25, 1933, New York City
- December 22–24, 1934, New York City
- 33rd Annual Convention, December 21–24, 1935, New York City
- 34th Annual Convention, December 1936, New York City
- 35th Annual Convention, December 25–26, 1937, New York City.
- 36th Annual Convention, December 24–26, 1938, New York City.
- 37th Annual Convention, December 23–25, 1939, New York City
- 38th Annual Convention, December 21–24, 1940, New York City
- 44th Annual Convention, December 22–24, 1947 Waldorf Astoria, New York City.
- 1948 Syracuse, New York
- August 1954, Roney Plaza Hotel, Miami Beach
- June 22, 1968, Washington D.C.

== Notable members ==
- Jill Wine-Banks (Phi) – one of the prosecutors during the Watergate scandal; first woman US General Counsel of the United States Army
- Jerry Lewis (Nu Honorary Pledge) – comedian, actor, National Chairman Muscular Dystrophy Association (MDA)

== See also ==
- List of social sororities and women's fraternities
- List of Jewish fraternities and sororities
