= Irwin Chanin =

American architect (1891–1988)

Irwin (Yitzchak) Salmon Chanin
- Chanin in 1927
- Born: October 29, 1891; New York City, US
- Died: February 24, 1988 (aged 96)
- Education: Cooper Union (B.S.)
- Occupations: Architect and real estate developer
- Spouse: Sylvia Schofler
- Children: Doris Chanin Freedman

Irwin Salmon Chanin (/tʃænˈɪn/ CHAN-in) (October 29, 1891 – February 24, 1988) was an American architect and real estate developer, best known for designing several Art Deco towers and Broadway theaters. (Note: See "Majestic". Spotlight on Broadway.)

== Biography ==
Irwin Chanin was born to a Jewish family, the son of an immigrant from Poland and an immigrant from Poltava, Ukraine. In 1915, he graduated from Cooper Union with a degree in civil engineering. At Cooper Union he was noted as a founder of Alpha Mu Sigma, a fraternity for Jewish men.

In 1919, Chanin and his brother Henry founded the Chanin Construction Company. In 1925, they built the 46th Street (now Richard Rodgers) Theatre, the first of six theaters they built on Broadway. This was followed by the Biltmore (Samuel J. Friedman), Majestic, Mansfield (Brooks Atkinson, Lena Horne), Masque (Golden), and Royale (Bernard B. Jacobs). The Chanins also built two apartment buildings on Central Park West: a twin-towered housing cooperative skyscraper named The Majestic in 1930 and The Century in 1931. The brothers developed the Chanin Building in midtown. They also developed the Lincoln Hotel (now Row NYC Hotel), the Beacon Hotel and Theater, and the World Apparel Center.

Chanin was also known for developing the "Green Acres" section of Valley Stream, New York. Ground broke in 1936 but only Phase I (known as the "old section") was completed before World War II. After the war construction resumed and the "new section" was completed by 1959. This section included the balance of the residential homes, the Forest Road Elementary School, the Green Acres Mall, and the Green Acres Garden Apartments.

He was President of Chanin Theatres Corporation, and his brother Henry I. Chanin was Treasurer. In 1981, Cooper Union renamed its school of architecture after him. Near the end of Chanin's life, several of his developments were protected as New York City designated landmarks, including the Century Apartments, the Beacon Theatre, and all six of his Broadway theaters.

== Personal life ==
In 1921, Chanin married Sylvia Schofler; she died in 1976. Their children included sons Paul Richard Chanin (died 2009) and Marcy Chanin (died 1997), and daughters Doris Chanin Freedman (died 1981) and Joan Chanin Schwartz. Irwin Chanin died on February 24, 1988. His funeral was held at the Stephen Wise Free Synagogue in Manhattan.
