= Tau Epsilon Phi =

North American collegiate fraternity

- ΤΕΦ
- Founded: October 1910; 116 years ago Columbia University
- Type: Social
- Affiliation: NIC
- Status: Active
- Emphasis: Jewish
- Scope: North America
- Motto: "Friendship, Chivalry, Service"
- Colors: Lavender and White
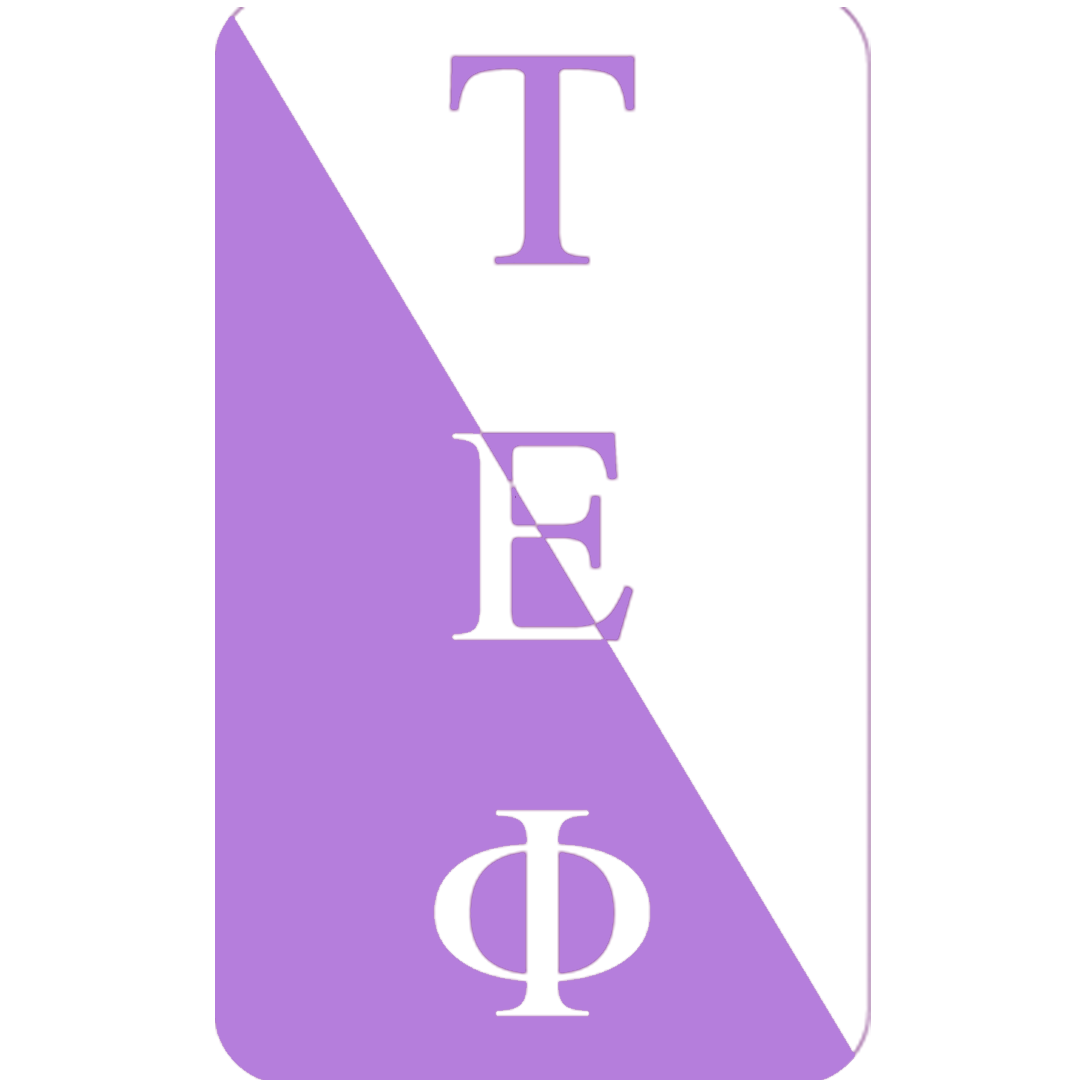
- Flag
- Flower: The Lily of the Mountain and The Violet in combination
- Jewel: Emerald and Pearl
- Publication: The Portals; The Plume
- Philanthropy: Our Military Kids
- Chapters: 144 chartered
- Members: 75,000+ lifetime
- Headquarters: 400 Broadway, #718; Troy, New York 12181; United States
- Website: www.tep.org

Tau Epsilon Phi (ΤΕΦ), commonly known as TEP or T E Phi, is an American collegiate social fraternity that was founded at Columbia University in 1910. Since its establishment, the fraternity has chartered 144 chapters, chiefly located at universities and colleges on the East Coast. Its national headquarters is located in Troy, New York. Although originally a Jewish fraternity, TEP opened to non-Jewish members in the 1960s.

== History ==
Tau Epsilon Phi was founded on October 10, 1910, at Columbia University as an organization of Jewish professional men. It was started in response to the existence of similar organizations that would not admit Jewish members. The fraternity's founding members were Robert Blume, Julius M. Breitenbach, Louis Freed, Ephraim Freedman, Harry Goldsmith, Samuel Greenbaum, Julius Klauber, Charles M. Driesen, Israel Schwartz, and J. J. Slofkin.

The first pledge, Maximillian Nemser, was initiated in 1911. In 1912, Beta chapter was founded at the New York College of Dentistry and Gamma chapter was founded at New York University. In 1913, it changed from a professional fraternity to a social fraternity for general college men. Continued expansion led to the adoption of a national constitution in 1916. In 1920, the opening of a chapter at McGill University in Montreal, made ΤΕΦ an international fraternity. The McGill chapter has since been disbanded.

Tau Epsilon Phi began as exclusively Jewish but began admitting non-Jewish members (predominantly Catholics) in the 1950s. Dwight D. Eisenhower was inducted as an honorary member during his presidential administration.

In September 2010, a group of fraternity members called TEPs for Justice filed a civil lawsuit against the national Tau Epsilon Phi organization. The plaintiffs alleged that the national executive director and board of directors had been operating the fraternity for personal financial gain and that they drove chapters away by making unreasonable financial demands on them (the fraternity had shrunk from 42 active chapters in 1999 to just thirteen in 2010). They further argued that the executive director failed to hold elections for the position for over ten years, even though the fraternity's constitution required it biennially. The executive director stated that elections could not take place because none of the chapters were in good standing due to failure to pay dues, and thus no one could legitimately vote. While the judge in the case ordered a new election overseen by an independent party, that order automatically stayed after the national organization filed for Chapter 7 bankruptcy in January 2011. In May 2011, all allegations were rescinded and the parties settled all outstanding cases with the fraternity agreed to hold new national elections.

After the new national elections, Tau Epsilon Phi went on to continue its operations, and progress was made in expansions. In 2013, the fraternity established the Alpha Tau colony at Rowan University, its first chapter since 1996. Following the success of the colony, the national organization re-established chapters at University of Maryland, Rutgers University-New Brunswick, and the University of Buffalo.

In 2018, Tau Epsilon Phi hired a new executive director and re-established its staff in its chapters and colonies. Since then, the fraternity has continued to hold its biennial elections and hired a chapter services consultant and expansion consultant. Tau Epsilon Phi is currently focused on expansion efforts to re-establish its presence at campuses where it has had previous chapters as well as exploring new campus opportunities.

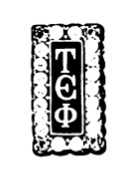
Tau Epsilon Phi badge

== Symbols ==
The fraternity's colors are lavender and white, although most chapters use purple instead of lavender. Its flowers are the lily of the mountain and the violet, in combination. The Tau Epsilon Phi badge is an enameled black oblong that features the Greek letters ΤΕΦ vertically, in gold. The border of the badge is outlined with emeralds and pearls, the fraternity's official jewels.

By the 1920s, the fraternity published the monthly Tau Epsilon Phi Bulletin. Beginning in 1923, the fraternity published a nationally distributed magazine, The Plume. In 1986, Sidney Suntag, who served as the fraternities' executive secretary from 1946 to 1979, published the book The History of Tau Epsilon Phi: 75 Years of Friendship 1910–1985.

== Governance ==
As of October 25, 1997, the Constitution of Tau Epsilon Phi requires a grand chapter meeting every two years. The grand chapter consists of delegates from each collegiate and alumni chapter. The grand chapter serves as the supreme legislature responsible for electing the grand council. The grand chapter, while in session, also serves as fraternity's board of directors, authorizing or approving all fraternity business, including any modifications to its constitution and statutory code.

The fraternity has eleven alumni associations, including:

- Alumni Association of Xi Chapter of Tau Epsilon Phi (Massachusetts Institute of Technology)
- Epsilon Iota Alumni Association (Rensselaer Polytechnic Institute)
- Epsilon Phi Chapter Alumni Association (Pennsylvania State University)
- Epsilon Theta Alumni Association (Queens College)
- Lambda Phi Epsilon Alumni Association (Clarkson University)
- Nu Chapter Alumni Association (University of Georgia)
- The Phi Chi Chapter Alumni Association of New York (City College of New York)
- The Sigma Epsilon Alumni Association (Rutgers University–Camden)
- Tau Alpha Chapter of Tau Epsilon Phi Fraternity Alumni Association, Inc. (University of Florida)
- Tau Alpha Kappa Alumni Association of Tau Epsilon Phi (Lehigh University)
- The Tau Omega Alumni Association (University of Rhode Island)

== Chapters ==
Tau Epsilon Phi has chartered 144 collegiate and provisional chapters throughout its existence.

== In popular culture ==
- In the Stephen King short story "Strawberry Spring" published in the collection Night Shift, a ΤΕΦ fraternity house is the opening setting to the story at the fictional New Sharon College.
- In the 1975 film Night Moves, Jennifer Warren's character Paula is seen wearing a Tau Epsilon Phi sweatshirt.
- On November 23, 2024, Dan Auerbach, the lead singer of The Black Keys, wore a Tau Epsilon Phi shirt while playing the Big Noon Kickoff event before the Ohio State University v. Indiana University Bloomington football game. Though Auerbach is not a member of Tau Epsilon Phi, both schools have active chapters.

== See also ==
- List of social fraternities
- List of Jewish fraternities and sororities
