= Sigma Omega Psi =

American Jewish fraternity (1914–1940)

- ΣΩΨ
- Founded: 1914; 112 years ago College of the City of New York
- Type: Social
- Affiliation: Independent
- Status: Merged
- Merge date: 1940
- Successor: Alpha Epsilon Pi
- Emphasis: Jewish
- Scope: National
- Publication: The Shield
- Chapters: 21
- Headquarters: New York City, New York; United States

Sigma Omega Psi (ΣΩΨ) was a historically Jewish Fraternity founded in 1914 and which merged into Alpha Epsilon Pi (ΑΕΠ) in 1940.

== History ==
Sigma Omega Psi was founded in 1914 at College of the City of New York. Its purpose was as Greek letter college fraternity for Jewish students and to foster the spirit of true brotherly love and self-sacrifice. Its publication was The Shield.

The fraternity held its Sixteenth Annual Convention at the Park Central Hotel in New York City on December 29 through 31, 1936. Its Seventeenth Annual Convention was held in Boston, Massachusetts on December 29 through 31, 1937.

By 1940, only five chapters would be active, and the decision was made to merge into Alpha Epsilon Pi.

At the time of the Union, only the chapters at Worcester Poly, Boston University, Tufts, Lowell, and New York University were active. The first three became Epsilon Deuteron chapter, Zeta Deuteron chapter, and Eta Deuteron chapter of Alpha Epsilon Pi, respectively. The chapter at Lowell could not be merged due to National Interfraternity Council requirements and the chapter at New York University was merged with Alpha Epsilon Pi's Alpha chapter. Subsequently, the chapters at Syracuse, MIT and CCNY were reactivated by Alpha Epsilon Pi and considered to be revivals of the chapters of Sigma Omega Psi at those schools.

== Chapters ==
More than twenty chapters were founded by 1940 including:

Chapter	Chartered Date and Range	Institution	Location	Status	Reference
Alpha	1914–1935	College of the City of New York	New York City, New York	Inactive	
Beta	1915–1926	Columbia University	New York City, New York	Inactive	
Gamma	1916–1940	New York University College of Medicine	New York City, New York	Inactive	
Delta	1919–1940	New York University	New York City, New York	Merged	(Note: Merged with the Alpha chapter of Alpha Epsilon Pi.)
Epsilon	1921–192x ?	Syracuse University	Syracuse, New York	Inactive	
Zeta	1919–19xx ?	New York University College of Dentistry	New York City, New York	Inactive	
Eta	June 23, 1920–1941	Lowell Textile Institute	Lowell, Massachusett	Inactive	(Note: Chapter became the Pi chapter of Alpha Epsilon fraternity with the expectation of joining AEPi when Lowell received regional accreditation. Instead, it became the Alpha Epsilon chapter of Pi Lambda Phi in 1949 after Lowell Textile's 1948 accreditation.)
Theta	May 3, 1919–1940	Worcester Polytechnic Institute	Worcester, Massachusetts	Merged	(Note: Chapter was formed from the Six Ten Club, established in 1919. It became the Epsilon Deuteron chapter of Alpha Epsilon Pi.)
Iota	1919–1940	Boston University	Boston, Massachusetts	Merged	(Note: Became the Zeta Deuteron chapter of Alpha Epsilon Pi.)
Kappa	1928–1931	Northeastern University	Boston, Massachusetts	Inactive	
Lambda	19xx ?–19xx ?	New York Law School	New York City, New York	Inactive	
Mu	May 1921 – 1940	Tufts College	Medford, Massachusetts	Merged	(Note: Became Eta Deuteron chapter of Alpha Epsilon Pi.)
Nu	1921–19xx ?	New York State School of Applied Agriculture	Farmingdale, New York	Inactive	
Xi	1922–1935	Massachusetts Institute of Technology	Cambridge, Massachusetts	Inactive	
Omicron	19xx ?–19xx ?	College of Physicians and Surgeons (Columbia University)	New York City, New York	Inactive	
Pi	May 26, 1923–19xx ?	Harvard University	Cambridge, Massachusetts	Inactive	
Rho	1926–1931	University of Alabama	Tuscaloosa, Alabama	Inactive	
Sigma				Unissued ?	
Tau	September 1926 – 1933	Temple University	Philadelphia, Pennsylvania	Inactive	
Upsilon	192x ?–19xx ?	St. John's College	New York City, New York	Inactive	
Phi	1927–c. 1934	Cornell University	Ithaca, New York	Inactive	

== Alumni Clubs ==
Sigma Omega Psi had three alumni clubs

== Notable members ==
- Nathaniel L. Goldstein - New York Attorney General 1943-1954.
