= Alpha Epsilon Pi =

International collegiate fraternity

- ΑΕΠ
- Founded: November 7, 1913; 113 years ago New York University
- Type: Social
- Affiliation: FFC
- Former affiliation: NIC
- Status: Active
- Emphasis: Jewish
- Scope: International
- Motto: "Developing Leadership for the Jewish Community"
- Colors: Gold; Blue
- Flag
- Flower: Fleur-de-lis
- Mascot: Lion
- Publication: The Lion
- Philanthropy: Repair the World, Gift of Life, Save A Child's Heart
- Chapters: 146 Active, 86 Inactive
- Colonies: 19
- Members: 9,000+ undergraduate active 102,000+ lifetime
- Nickname: AEPi
- Headquarters: Indianapolis, Indiana; United States
- Website: AEPi.org

Alpha Epsilon Pi (ΑΕΠ), commonly known as AEPi, is a college fraternity founded at New York University in 1913. The fraternity has more than 150 active chapters across the United States, Canada, United Kingdom, and Israel, and has initiated more than 110,000 members. Although the fraternity is based upon Jewish principles, it is non-discriminatory and is open to all who are willing to espouse its purpose and values regardless of their particular faith tradition.

== History ==
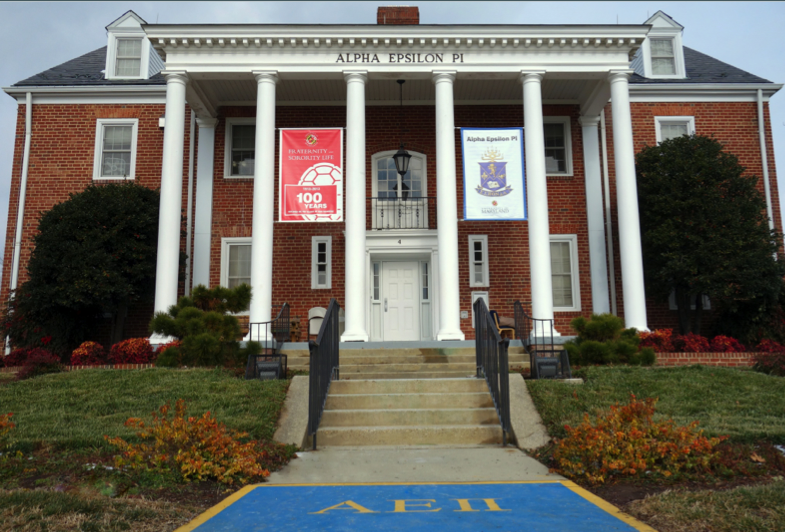
The AEPi house at the University of Maryland, College Park

Alpha Epsilon Pi was founded on November 7, 1913, under the Washington Square Arch at New York University (NYU) by Charles C. Moskowitz and 10 other Jewish men: David K. Schafer, Isador M. Glazer, Herman L. Kraus, Arthur E. Leopold, Benjamin M. Meyer, Arthur M. Lipkint, Charles J. Pintel, Maurice Plager, Hyman Schulman, and Emil J. Lustgarten. These men are known as the "Immortal 11." Their first pledge was Samuel L. Epstein.

Charles C. Moskowitz had just transferred to New York University's School of Commerce from the City College of New York. Several fraternities at the School of Commerce expressed interest in him and one gave him a bid. The name of that fraternity is unknown. When Charles asked whether his close Jewish friends could join as well, he was told that the invitation was for him alone. At this point, the group of 11 men began meeting regularly in a German Ratskeller called "Haan's Ladies' and Gentlemen's Restaurant, Cafe and Rathskeller". Official school recognition of AEPi was granted on November 7.

The founding members intended for AEPi to be a national fraternity even before the second chapter at NYU was designated the Alpha chapter. In 1917, the local fraternity Phi Tau at Cornell University became the Beta chapter of AEPi.

Only fifty-two men had been initiated into AEPi by the start of World War I. Almost every undergraduate and alumnus of the fraternity served in the military, causing the fraternity to become nearly inactive during the war years.

In the years between the world wars, Alpha Epsilon Pi grew to 28 chapters. Expansion remained dormant throughout World War II as many fraternity members served in the war effort.

With the end of the war and the shift of the national headquarters to St. Louis, Missouri, Alpha Epsilon Pi had gained new life and momentum in its reopening of inactive chapters, expansion to new campuses, and merging with other locals, that had seen reduced membership as a result of the war. In 1940, Sigma Omega Psi joined Alpha Epsilon Pi adding three chapters, as did Sigma Tau Phi in 1947.

The next two decades were a time of steady growth for Alpha Epsilon Pi, as well as other college fraternities. However, with the onset of fighting in Vietnam in the early 1960s, fraternity life faltered. Liberal student bodies revolted against authority and the Greek system, which was seen as a conservative, elitist group. Membership plummeted and nearly half the chapter roll was lost. However, the fraternity was able to reverse the trend and stabilize membership numbers by 1975, following the end of the Vietnam War.

In 2009, AEPi became the first fraternity to establish a chapter in Israel at the Interdisciplinary Center in Herzliya. In 2014, AEPi was the first college student organization to be admitted as a full member to the Conference of Presidents of Major American Jewish Organizations. In 2015, AEPi became the first fraternity to establish a chapter in Australia.

== Symbols ==
AEPi's motto is "Developing Leadership for the Jewish Community". Its badge is the Greek letters ΑΕΠ, arranged horizontally in gold and studded with pearls. The fraternity's colors are gold and blue. Its mascot is the lion. Its flower is the fleur-de-lis. Its publication is The Lion.

=== Coat of arms ===
To Brothers, it is known as the "Cofa," arranged by the initials of the phrase. The coat of arms of Alpha Epsilon Pi contains several symbolic objects, the true meaning of which is only revealed to brothers during their initiation into the fraternity. Regardless, the coat of arms does contain symbols that have a history in Judaism obvious to the uninitiated and even to non-Jewish people. The crest of the arms contains a menorah intertwined with the star of David. Also, the top of the arms has a lion that could be the Lion of Judah.

== Philanthropies ==
As for 2026, Philanthropies include Repair the World, Gift of Life Marrow Registry, and Save A Child's Heart

== Governance ==
=== International ===
AEPi is governed by the Supreme Board of Governors. The Supreme Board of Governors is made up of 11 positions: Supreme Master (President); Supreme Master-Elect (President-Elect/VP); Supreme Scribe (Secretary); Supreme Exchequer (Treasurer); Supreme Sentinel (Sergeant-at-Arms); five Supreme Governors at-large (other alumni members); and the Immediate Past Supreme Master

The Supreme Board of Governors makes the majority of decisions for the fraternity's well-being and meets semi-annually to discuss matters of importance, including the granting of charters. The Executive Office is made up of the professional staff that oversees the day-to-day functions of the fraternity. The current chief executive officer is Rob Derdiger.

Leadership input to the SBG from the undergraduate membership is accepted from The Undergraduate Cabinet, whose members are elected annually in the winter.

=== Foundation ===
The Alpha Epsilon Pi Foundation is the charitable arm of the organization. It directs the philanthropic affairs of the fraternity, supports projects of a Jewish and fraternal nature, and provides support for the individual chapters and colonies. They work very closely with the Director of Jewish Programming.

=== Local ===
AEPi has specific titles that are used for its officers; many correspond to Fraternal tradition.

- President — Master
- Vice President — Lieutenant Master
- Secretary — Scribe
- Treasurer — Exchequer
- Sergeant at Arms — Brother at Large
- Master of Ceremonies / Risk Manager — Sentinel
- Head of Recruitment — Rush Chair
- Pledge Master — New Member Educator

== Chapters ==
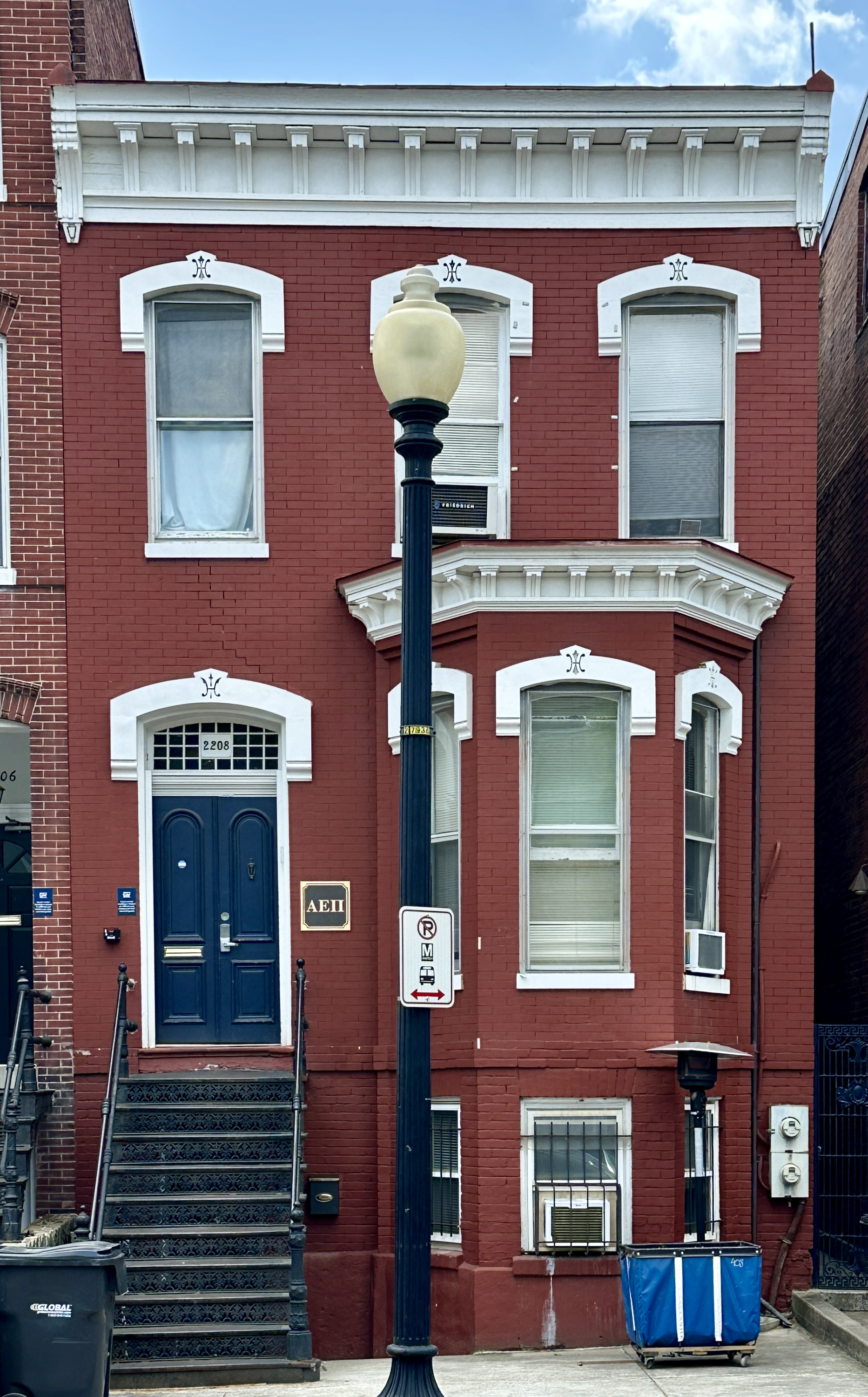
Kappa Deuteron chapter of Alpha Epsilon Pi at George Washington University

The fraternity currently has 154 active chapters and colonies in eleven of the fourteen Big Ten Conference schools, seven of eight Ivy League schools, and eight of the ten University of California campuses. It is also the largest international fraternity in Canada, California, New York, and Massachusetts. The fraternity established the Aleph chapter in Israel during the spring of 2009, located in the Interdisciplinary Center in Herzliya. It has since expanded to other universities in Israel. In 2011, the fraternity expanded to the United Kingdom, establishing a colony at St Andrews in the spring, followed by Birmingham and Leeds in the fall.

The fraternity also has 24 active alumni clubs in several major cities.

== Notable members ==
AEPi counts among its members at least 7 billionaires, including Facebook founder Mark Zuckerberg and Las Vegas Sands founder Sheldon Adelson. Alumni also include the founders of Tinder, Lyft, Home Depot and Hotels.com as well as former/current presidents or chairmen of Citigroup, ESPN, MGM Studios, Walt Disney Studios, 20th Century Fox and NBC Television.

In sports, AEPi alumni include the founder and first owner of the Harlem Globetrotters, the current owner of the Chicago Bulls and Chicago White Sox, the CEO of the Atlanta Hawks, president of the Florida Panthers, the commissioner of the National Hockey League and at least 2 Olympians.

In American politics, AEPi has had at least 6 U.S. Representatives, 1 U.S. Senator, 1 U.S. Governor, a former Israeli Ambassador to the United States and a U.S. State Supreme Court Justice. In Canadian politics, AEPi alumni include the former Minister of Justice and Attorney General of Canada, the current and one former Israeli Ambassador to Canada, as well as Canada's first Jewish Cabinet member and Deputy Prime Minister of Canada.

In arts & entertainment, AEPi alumni include Pritzker Prize-winning architect Frank Gehry, Academy Award and Emmy Award-winner James L. Brooks, both members of Simon & Garfunkel, American producer Tyson Bidner, singer/rapper Hoodie Allen, actor Gene Wilder, as well as co-creator of American Dad! Matt Weitzman, and Family Guy writer Neil Goldman.

The fraternity also counts 3 Nobel Prize-winners among its alumni. Award-winning children's author and marine conservationist Steven Kamlet was a member of the Eta chapter at Ohio State.

The organization's current Supreme Master (its highest-elected position in its international governance) as of 2026 is Adam Cohen. The immediate Past Supreme Master is Eric Farbman.

== Controversies and local chapter misconduct ==
=== Reassertion of Jewish focus ===
Alpha Epsilon Pi's mission statement describing a "non-discriminatory fraternity" has occasionally come under fire, particularly under former Executive Director Andrew Borans:

- In 1990, Alpha Epsilon Pi's Mu Tau chapter at MIT decided to disband their chapter after the international fraternity kicked out 45 of 55 members of the chapter. Members believed it was largely in part due to the international fraternity's desire to use a member review process to re-align the chapter as a Jewish fraternity. Joseph P. Wong, former vice president of the chapter who was invited to stay, was quoted saying "AEPi is inherently discriminatory and does not deserve a place on this campus". Soon after, the national fraternity successfully rebuilt its Mu Tau chapter, with an emphasis on its Jewish heritage. Meanwhile, the brothers who'd been removed went on to form a local chapter, which, five years later was admitted en masse to become the restored Epsilon Theta chapter of Sigma Nu on the campus, which was also successful.
- In 1998, members of UCLA's Xi Deuteron chapter dropped out, stating that the international organization was "discriminatory against non-Jewish pledges".
- In 2015, the Beta Rho chapter at Brown University disaffiliated with Alpha Epsilon Pi, citing mistreatment of non-Jewish members by their international organization, and a lack of emphasis by the international organization on sexual assault education.
- In 2018, all but one brother at the chapter at Union College resigned their life membership in AEPi in response to perceived discrimination by the international fraternity against non-Jewish brothers. In this case, membership audits were facilitated by the international office. This resulted in the removal of every active non-Jewish brother, while only a single Jewish brother was removed by the international office. The international office cited "continued non-compliance with the health and safety regulations of the national organization"; however, many of those removed were new to the chapter and, therefore, could not possibly have violated any of these regulations.

=== Local chapter or member misconduct ===
- In 2015, the chapter at the University of Wisconsin-Madison, was terminated for holding events while suspended. The initial suspension was due to an incident in which a minor and another guest were transported to detox after being served alcohol by Alpha Epsilon Pi. This was followed by multiple other incidents involving alcohol, eventually leading to termination. Alpha Epsilon Pi activities at UW-Madison continued even after termination, including incidents of hazing.
- In 2016, a freshman female student at the College of Charleston, site of ΑΕΠ's Chi Omicron chapter, sued the fraternity after she stated she was disrobed, served drugs and alcohol, and raped while one of the fraternity members recorded the assault on his cellphone during the fraternity's Bid Day celebration party. Her lawsuit states she had been seeking unspecified damages for her "serious personal injuries" that have required hospitalization, doctor's care, and other treatment. As a result of the lawsuit, two fraternity members, Timothy Eli Seppi, and James F. West III, identified in the incident were arrested and released on bail and the fraternity charter was revoked.
- In 2018, Temple University suspended its ΑΕΠ chapter due to allegations of sexual assault at the fraternity's parties. The chapter's then-president was sentenced to three to seven years in prison for an attempted sexual assault that occurred during a party at the fraternity's house.
- In 2018, a member of the Phi Tau chapter at Florida State University punched another member during a ritual called "Scumbag of the Week". The victim fell backward and hit his head, causing a traumatic brain injury that forced him to drop out of the university and move out of state for medical care. The fraternity member who punched him was sentenced to 30 days in jail.
- In 2019, the Upsilon Alpha chapter at the University of Arizona was kicked off campus for code-of-conduct violations including alcohol use, hazing, and bodily harm to pledges.
- In 2019, the Epsilon chapter at Emory University was mandated to shut down for at least two years due to hazing pledges and alcohol violations.
- In 2020, several members left the Upsilon Kappa Alpha chapter at the University of St Andrews after more than twelve posts alleging rapes and sexual assaults were posted anonymously through social media, but in the absence of any formal complaint no member was expelled.
- In 2024, the Omega Deuteron chapter at the University of Michigan was suspended after a video showing hazing at the chapter leaked online.
- In 2026, police responded to a hazing incident at the Pi chapter at the University of Wisconsin–Madison. Over two dozen males were found in a basement with the thermostat set to 81 degrees with food, condiments, and 'other liquids' coating the interior and the pledges. Police reported that several of the males found had injuries consistent with physical abuse. The president and vice president of the chapter were identified as the perpetrators were arrested.

=== Anti-Semitism Report ===
In September 2021, a report based on a survey conducted by the Cohen Research Group for the Louis D. Brandeis Center for Human Rights Under Law and the Alpha Epsilon Pi fraternity examined the experiences of Jewish fraternity and sorority members on college campuses. The survey collected responses from 1,027 self-identified Jewish students involved in Greek life at 118 campuses across North America. The report revealed that 65% of respondents had experienced or were aware of antisemitism on their campuses, and 50% admitted to hiding their Jewish identity at times to avoid hostility or discomfort.

Marcus argued that the findings should alarm college leaders, as many Jewish students feel pressured to conceal their identity due to rising antisemitism on campuses.

== See also ==
- List of Jewish fraternities and sororities
- List of social fraternities
