= Nova Southeastern University College of Pharmacy =

Coordinates: 26°4′58.4″N 80°14′58.7″W

Barry and Judy Silverman College of Pharmacy
- Established: 1987; 39 years ago
- Parent institution: Nova Southeastern University
- Accreditation: Accreditation Council for Pharmacy Education
- Dean: Michelle A. Clark
- Website: pharmacy.nova.edu
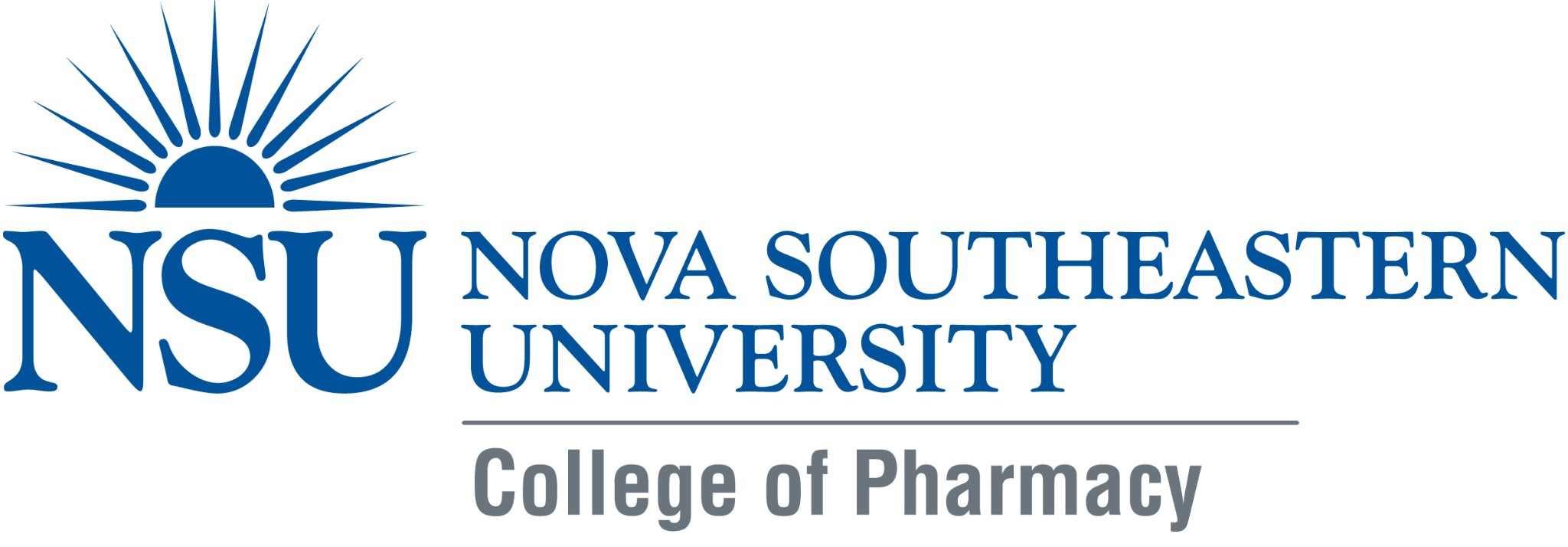

Barry and Judy Silverman College of Pharmacy, is a school of tertiary education in pharmacy, a branch of Nova Southeastern University. It offers an entry-level Doctor of Pharmacy program in three sites and an international program in Davie. The College also hosts a number of post-graduate residency programs. As of 2023, the college is tied for #79 of pharmacy schools in the United States.

== History ==
The college admitted its first class in 1987 and was the only school of pharmacy in South Florida. Since its opening, the school has graduated over 6,000 alumni pursuing careers in healthcare.

The school's Bachelor of Science: Pharmacy program was dissolved on June 30, 1997, following a national trend mandating all future practicing pharmacists to pursue their Doctor of Pharmacy degree.

In March 2023, the school was named as the Barry and Judy Silverman College of Pharmacy in honor of Board of Trustees Vice Chair, Dr. Barry Silverman, and his wife, Judy.

== Programs ==
The school offers four graduate programs:

- Doctor of Pharmacy (PharmD)
- Doctor of Philosophy (Ph.D.) in Pharmaceutical Sciences
- Masters of Science (M.S.) in Pharmaceutical Sciences
- Masters of Science (M.S.) in Pharmaceutical Affairs

The school typically admits about 200 Doctor of Pharmacy students per class. Students and faculty at the Barry and Judy Silverman College of Pharmacy have the opportunity to participate in the Erasmus Program, an academic exchange program that only a few colleges participate in.

The college has several "medical outreach" programs globally, including in Guatemala and the Dominican Republic. They also participate in the International Pharmaceutical Federation's Pharmabridge program.
