= List of Phi Epsilon Pi chapters =

== Chapters ==
Phi Epsilon Pi was a predominantly Jewish collegiate fraternity, active between 1904 and 1970. In the following list of chapters, inactive chapters and institutions are in italics.

Chapter	Charter date and range	Institution	Location	Status	Ref.
Alpha	November 23, 1904–1970	City College of New York	New York City, New York	Merged (ΖΒΤ)	(Note: Chapter merged with an existing Zeta Beta Tau chapter with the national merger of the two fraternities.)
Beta	1905–1928, 1959–1970	Columbia University	New York City, New York	Merged (ΖΒΤ)	(Note: After going dormant, the chapter reformed from Phi Ep Club, established in 1957.)
Epsilon	1911–1970	Cornell University	Ithaca, New York	Merged (ΖΒΤ)	
Zeta	1913–1970	University of Pittsburgh	Pittsburgh, Pennsylvania	Merged (ΖΒΤ)	(Note: Chapter formed from Alpha Kappa Pi, established in 1912.)
Eta	1914–1970	University of Pennsylvania	Philadelphia, Pennsylvania	Merged (ΖΒΤ)	(Note: Chapter absorbed Kappa Nu.)
Theta	1914–1970	Pennsylvania State University	State College, Pennsylvania	Merged (ΖΒΤ)	
Iota	1914–1970	Dickinson College	Carlisle, Pennsylvania	Merged (ΖΒΤ)	(Note: Chapter formed from Phi Kappa Delta, established in 1913.) (Note: Became a Zeta Beta Tau chapter with the national merger of the two fraternities.)
Kappa	1914–1922, 1949–1970	New York University, Washington Square	New York City, New York	Merged (ΖΒΤ)	
Lambda	1915–1970	Rutgers University	New Brunswick, New Jersey	Merged (ΖΒΤ)	(Note: Chapter formed from Theta Pi, established in 1914.)
Mu	1915–1970	University of Georgia	Athens, Georgia	Merged (ΖΒΤ)	(Note: Chapter formed from Eay Daketh Sigma, established in 1895.)
Nu	1916–1970	University of Virginia	Charlottesville, Virginia	Merged (ΖΒΤ)	(Note: Revived a Zeta Beta Tau chapter with the national merger of the two fraternities.)
Xi	1916–1970	Georgia Tech	Atlanta, Georgia	Merged (ΖΒΤ)	
Omicron	1916–1970	Tufts University	Medford and Somerville, Massachusetts	Merged (ΖΒΤ)	(Note: Chapter formed in Delta Phi Delta, established in 1915.)
Pi	1916–1925	University of Maine	Orono, Maine	Inactive	(Note: Chapter formed from Lambda Sigma Pi, established in 1914.)
Rho	1916–1921	Rhode Island State College	Kingston, Rhode Island	Inactive	(Note: Chapter formed from Sigma Rho, established in 1915.)
Sigma	1916–1918	Brown University	Providence, Rhode Island	Inactive	
Tau	1916–1920	Auburn University	Auburn, Alabama	Inactive	
Upsilon	1916–1964	University of Connecticut	Storrs, Connecticut	Inactive	(Note: Chapter formed from Kappa Beta Iota, established in 1912.)
Phi	1916–1922	Carnegie Institute of Technology	Pittsburgh, Pennsylvania	Inactive	(Note: Chapter formed from Sigma Delta Chi, established in 1915.)
Chi	1917–1970	Syracuse University	Syracuse, New York	Merged (ΖΒΤ)	(Note: Chapter formed from Delta Psi Epsilon, established in 1916.)
Psi	1920–1970	University of Illinois		Merged (ΖΒΤ)	
Omega	October 24, 1920–1935	University of Cincinnati	Cincinnati, Ohio	Inactive	(Note: Chapter formed from Theta Club, established in 1919.)
Gamma	1920–1970	Northwestern University	Evanston, Illinois	Merged (ΖΒΤ)	(Note: Chapter formed from Lambda Club, established in 1919.)
Delta	1920–1970	Washington and Lee University	Lexington, Virginia	Inactive	
Alpha Alpha	December 5, 1920–1922	Dartmouth College	Hanover, New Hampshire	Inactive	(Note: Chapter formed from Alpha Omega, established in 1920.)
Alpha Beta	November 26, 1920–1970	University of Iowa	Iowa City, Iowa	Merged (ΖΒΤ)	
Alpha Gamma	May 8, 1921–1942, 1955–1970	University of Michigan	Ann Arbor, Michigan	Merged (ΖΒΤ)	(Note: Chapter formed from the Cacique Club, established in 1920. After going dormant, it reformed as a colony in 1955.)
Alpha Epsilon	November 30, 1920–1970	Johns Hopkins University	Baltimore, Maryland	Merged (ΖΒΤ)	
Alpha Delta	1923–1970	University of Minnesota		Inactive	(Note: Chapter formed from Xi Psi Theta, established in 1914.)
Alpha Eta	1925–1937, 1946–1951, 1966–1970	University of Wisconsin	Madison, Wisconsin	Merged (ΖΒΤ)	(Note: Chapter formed from Phi Phi Phi, established in 1924. After going dormant, it reformed as a colony in 1945 and 1965.)
Zeta	1926–1935	Harvard University	Cambridge, Massachusetts	Inactive	(Note: Chapter formed from Phi Clu Alpha, established in 1925.)
Alpha Theta	1928–1970	University of South Carolina	Columbia, South Carolina	Merged (ΖΒΤ)	(Note: Chapter formed from Trubador Club, established in 1927.)
Alpha Iota	1929–1970	University of Miami	Coral Gables, Florida	Merged (ΖΒΤ)	(Note: Chapter formed from Pi Kappa Mu, established in 1927.)
Alpha Mu	1930–1952	George Washington University	Washington, D.C.	Inactive	
Alpha Nu	1932–1970	Muhlenberg College	Allentown, Pennsylvania	Merged (ΖΒΤ)	(Note: Chapter formed from a chapter of Sigma Lambda Pi, established in 1926, as part of a national merger of the two fraternities.)
Alpha Xi	1932–1970	Boston University	Boston, Massachusetts	Merged (ΖΒΤ)	(Note: Chapter formed from a chapter of Sigma Lambda Pi, established in 1924, as part of the national merger of the two fraternities.)
Alpha Omicron	1932–1966	Ohio State University	Columbus, Ohio	Inactive	(Note: Chapter formed from a chapter of Sigma Lambda Pi, established in 1927, as part of the national merger of the two fraternities.)
Alpha Kappa	1933–1955, 1966–1970	Case Western Reserve University	Cleveland, Ohio	Merged (ΖΒΤ)	(Note: Chapter formed from Phi Delta Gamma, established in 1921. After going dormant, it reformed as a colony in 1965.)
Alpha Pi	1933–1938	Louisiana State University	Baton Rouge, Louisiana	Inactive	(Note: Chapter formed from Sigma Kappa Phi, established in 1931.)
Alpha Rho	1933–1969	Ohio University	Athens, Ohio	Inactive	(Note: Chapter formed from Phi Upsilon, established in 1928.)
Alpha Sigma	1933–1970	University of Mississippi	University, Mississippi	Merged (ΖΒΤ)	(Note: Chapter formed from Alpha Mu, established in 1931.)
Alpha Tau	1948–1970	Queens College	Queens, New York City, New York	Merged (ΖΒΤ)	
Alpha Lambda (see Kappa Alpha Delta)	1948–1954	University of California, Los Angeles	Los Angeles, California	Inactive	
Alpha Upsilon	1949–1959	Memphis State University	Memphis, Tennessee	Inactive	(Note: Chapter formed from Lancers, established in 1948.)
Alpha Phi	1949–1962	North Carolina State University	Raleigh, North Carolina	Inactive	(Note: Chapter formed from Phi Epsilon Tau, established in 1966.)
Alpha Chi	1950–1955	University of Omaha	Omaha, Nebraska	Inactive	(Note: Chapter formed from Beta Tau Kappa, established in 1933.)
Alpha Psi	1951–19xx ?	McGill University	Montreal, Quebec, Canada	Inactive	
Beta Alpha	1956–1970	University of Houston	Houston, Texas	Merged (ΖΒΤ)	(Note: Chapter formed from Alpha Sigma Tau, established in 1951.)
Beta Beta	1957–1970	American University	Washington, D.C.	Merged (ΖΒΤ)	(Note: Chapter formed from Tau Delta Chi, established in 1955.)
Beta Gamma	1958–1970	Brooklyn College	New York City, New York	Merged (ΖΒΤ)	(Note: Chapter formed from Sigma Theta Delta, established in 1947.)
Beta Delta	1959–1970	Rensselaer Polytechnic Institute	Troy, New York	Merged (ΖΒΤ)	(Note: Chapter formed from Phi Epsilon, established in 1958.)
Beta Epsilon	1960–1970	University of Florida	Gainesville, Florida	Merged (ΖΒΤ)	(Note: Chapter formed from Lance & Shield, established in 1959.)
Beta Zeta	1961–1970	Philadelphia College of Textiles and Science	Philadelphia, Pennsylvania	Merged (ΖΒΤ)	(Note: Chapter formed from Sigma Tau Phi, established in 1915.)
Beta Eta	1961–1967	Indiana University	Bloomington, Indiana	Inactive	(Note: Chapter formed from Sigma Sigma, established in 1960.)
Kappa Alpha	1961–1970	University of Rochester	Rochester, New York	Merged (ΖΒΤ)	(Note: Chapter formed from the national merger with Kappa Nu fraternity; the predecessor chapter was established in 1911.)
Kappa Beta	1961–1970	New York University-University Heights	Bronx, New York	Merged (ΖΒΤ)	(Note: Chapter formed from the national merger with Kappa Nu fraternity; the predecessor chapter was established in 1915.)
Kappa Zeta	1961–1969	State University of New York at Buffalo	Buffalo, New York	Inactive	(Note: Chapter formed from the national merger with Kappa Nu fraternity; the predecessor chapter was established in 1917.)
Kappa Iota	1961–1970	Union College	Schenectady, New York	Merged (ΖΒΤ)	
Kappa Nu	1961–1970	University of California, Berkeley	Berkeley, California	Inactive	(Note: Chapter formed from the national merger with Kappa Nu fraternity; the predecessor chapter was established in 1921.)
Kappa Pi	1961–1970	University of Alabama	Tuscaloosa, Alabama	Inactive	
Kappa Phi	1961–1970	Alfred University	Alfred, New York	Merged (ΖΒΤ)	(Note: Chapter formed from the national merger with Kappa Nu fraternity; the predecessor chapter was established in 1933.)
Kappa Alpha Delta (see Alpha Lambda)	1961–1970	University of California, Los Angeles	Los Angeles, California	Merged (ΖΒΤ)	(Note: This was the re-establishment of Alpha Lambda chapter. It was formed from Kappa Nu (local), established in 1952.)
Kappa Alpha Tau	1961–1963	Wayne State University	Detroit, Michigan	Inactive	(Note: Chapter formed from the national merger with Kappa Nu fraternity; the predecessor chapter was established in 1952.)
Beta Theta	1962–1976	University of Maryland, College Park	College Park, Maryland	Inactive	
Beta Iota	1963–1970	Long Island University	Brooklyn, New York	Inactive	(Note: Chapter formed from Beta Tau, established in 1963.)
Beta Kappa	1964–1970	California State University, Long Beach	Long Beach, California	Merged (ΖΒΤ)	(Note: Chapter formed from Beta Kappa, established in 1964.)
Beta Lambda	1965–1970	Northern Illinois University	DeKalb, Illinois	Merged (ΖΒΤ)	(Note: Chapter formed from Delta Kappa Iota, established in 1963.)
Beta Mu	1966–1970	C.W. Post Campus of Long Island University	Brookville, New York	Inactive	
Beta Xi	1966–1970	Baruch College	New York City, New York	Inactive	
Beta Omicron	1967–1970	DePaul University	Chicago, Illinois	Merged (ΖΒΤ)	
Beta Pi	1967–1970	Western New England College	Springfield, Massachusetts	Merged (ΖΒΤ)	
Beta Sigma	1967–1970	Southampton College of Long Island University	Southampton, New York	Inactive	
Beta Nu	May 16, 1968 – 1970	Bryant University	Smithfield, Rhode Island	Inactive	(Note: Chapter formed from Alpha Omicron, established in 1951.)
Beta Tau	1968–1970	Widener University	Chester, Pennsylvania	Merged (ΖΒΤ)	
Beta Upsilon	1968–1970	Polytechnic Institute of Brooklyn	Brooklyn, New York	Inactive	
Beta Phi	1968–1970	West Chester University	West Chester, Pennsylvania	Merged (ΖΒΤ)	
Beta Chi	1969–1970	Hofstra University	Hempstead, New York	Inactive	(Note: Chapter formed from D. E. B., established in 1947.)
Beta Psi	1969––1970	Drake University	Des Moines, Iowa	Merged (ΖΒΤ)	(Note: Chapter formed from Phi Epsilon Phi, established in 1965.)
Beta Rho ?	1969–1970	University of New Haven	West Haven, Connecticut	Merged (ΖΒΤ)	
Colony	1970	University of Tampa	Tampa, Florida	Withdrew	(Note: Became a colony of Alpha Epsilon Pi instead of merging with Zeta Beta Tau.)
