= North American Interfraternity Conference =

Trade association of collegiate men's fraternities

- NIC
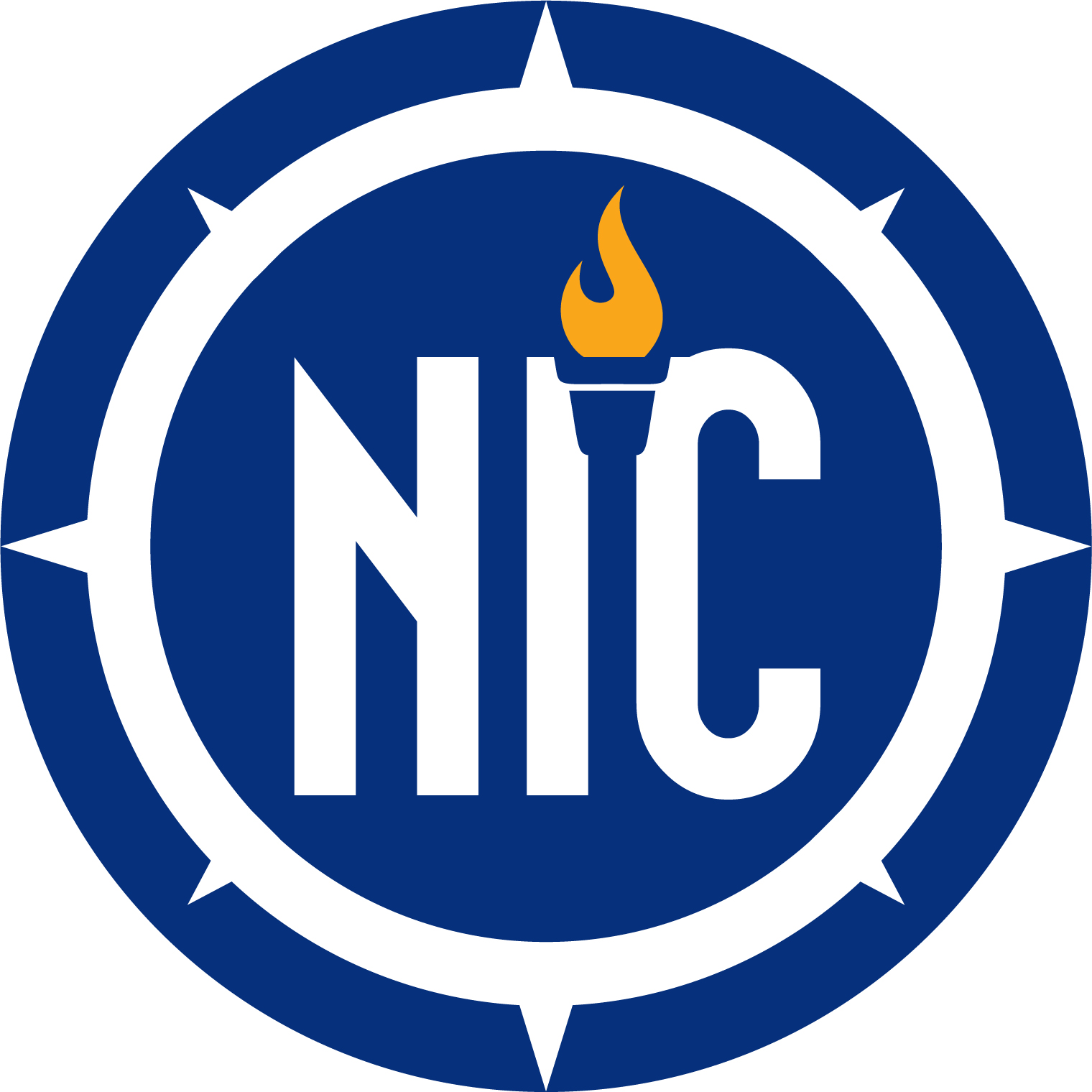
- The NIC logo
- Founded: November 27, 1909; 116 years ago University Club of New York
- Type: Umbrella
- Affiliation: Independent
- Status: Active
- Emphasis: Collegiate fraternities
- Scope: North America
- Members: 57 fraternities active
- Former name: Interfraternity Conference; National Interfraternity Conference
- Headquarters: 11722 Allisonville Road; Suite 103, Box 352; Fishers, Indiana 46038; United States
- Website: nicfraternity.org

The North American Interfraternity Conference (or NIC; formerly known as the National Interfraternity Conference) is a trade association of intercollegiate men's social fraternities that was formally organized in 1910. Its name was changed from the National Interfraternity Conference to the North American Interfraternity Conference in 1999 to reflect the organization's affiliations at Canadian colleges and universities.

As of December 2021, the NIC had 56 member organizations with 4,000 chapters located on over 800 campuses in the United States and Canada with approximately 350,000 undergraduate members.

== History ==
The North American Interfraternity Conference (NIC) is an association of intercollegiate men's social fraternities that was formally organized in 1910. However, it began at a meeting at the University Club of New York on November 27, 1909. Originally named the Interfraternity Conference, the name was changed to the National Interfraternity Conference in 1931. The name, North American Interfraternity Conference, was adopted in 1999 to reflect the organization's affiliations at Canadian colleges and universities.

The NIC promotes "the shared interests and values of [its] member fraternities: leadership, service, brotherhood and scholarship". The services it provides its members include accountability, advocacy, collaboration, education, and marketing.

As of December 2021, the NIC had 56 member organizations with 4,000 chapters located on over 800 campuses in the United States and Canada with approximately 350,000 undergraduate members.

== Membership requirements ==
The NIC membership requirements are detailed in the By-Laws of the North American Interfraternity Conference. Each member fraternity must be national or international in scope, as opposed to local, which is defined to mean having five chapters of ten men each, having three chapters that have been part of the fraternity for at least five years, and having a constitution that calls for national conventions with the interim authority vested in a smaller governing body. Further, each fraternity must be exclusive of other NIC members and, therefore, in competition with them for recruitment. All members' chapters must exist at four or two-year degree-granting colleges. The members agree to share "best practices, statistics, and information that will benefit member organizations".

Also, the members agree to uphold universal fraternal ideals, to hold their chapters and colonies to their general vision statements, honor NIC resolutions, abide by the NIC Constitution and By-Laws, attend all meetings of the House of Delegates, and pay membership dues.

== Governance ==
The NIC is not a governing or regulatory board. It is a voluntary trade association. The power of the organization rests in a House of Delegates in which each member fraternity is represented by a single delegate. However, the group's executive and administrative powers are vested in an elected board of directors consisting of nine volunteers from various NIC fraternities. Headquartered in Indianapolis, Indiana, the NIC has a small professional staff.

It meets at the NIC Congressional Reception and the NIC Annual Meeting. At the congressional reception, the leadership of the NIC, National Panhellenic Conference (NPC), National Pan-Hellenic Council (NPHC), and the National Association of Latino Fraternal Organizations (NALFO) sponsors a series of meetings and receptions to advance an agenda that is positive toward fraternal organizations.

== Educational programming ==
NIC staff members create learning opportunities for undergraduate men through a variety of programs, most notably the IFC Academy, Undergraduate Interfraternity Institute (UIFI), IMPACT, PRIME, and LAUNCH. The IFC Academy is a four‐hour program, focusing participants on their role in developing high‐performing IFCs – specifically the role of the IFC in serving the needs of its member fraternities, and the role the NIC Standards play in supporting high performance. The Undergraduate Interfraternity Institute (UIFI) is a five-day co-educational program that brings fraternity and sorority leaders together and teaches leadership skills. IMPACT (Influence, Motivation, Purpose, Action, Commitment, and Trust) is a campus-based weekend program led by NIC staff that brings fraternity and sorority community leaders together to identify a strategy for change and/or improvement to the local fraternal experience. PRIME is a summit for IFC presidents. LAUNCH is a training retreat for fraternity and sorority leaders that is held both virtually and in-person.

== Affiliate organizations ==
=== Current members ===
At one time, the National Interfraternity Conferences separated its members into those with junior membership and those with senior membership. In addition to the fraternity's websites, chapter information is available at the Almanac of Fraternities and Sororities.

Fraternity	Symbols	Founding date	Active chapters	Chapters chartered	NIC dates	Ref.
Acacia	AKAK	May 11, 1904	38	94	November 27, 1909	(Note: NIC founding member)
Alpha Chi Rho	ΑΧΡ	June 4, 1895	41	93	November 27, 1909	
Alpha Delta Gamma	ΑΔΓ	October 10, 1924	12	29	November 30, 1961	(Note: Joined as a junior member.)
Alpha Delta Phi	ΑΔΦ	October 29, 1832	33	53	November 27, 1909	
Alpha Gamma Rho	ΑΓΡ	April 4, 1908	72		1918	
Alpha Kappa Lambda	ΑΚΛ	April 22, 1914	30	79	April 9, 1930	(Note: Joined as a junior member and became a senior member in 1954.)
Alpha Phi Alpha	ΑΦΑ	December 4, 1906	354	414	2006	
Alpha Tau Omega	ΑΤΩ	September 11, 1865	132	250	November 27, 1909	
Beta Chi Theta	ΒΧΘ	June 2, 1999	27		2006	
Beta Sigma Psi	ΒΣΨ	April 17, 1925	10	25	1952	(Note: Joined as a junior member and became a senior member in 1969)
Beta Theta Pi	ΒΘΠ	August 8, 1839	158	179	November 27, 1909	
Beta Upsilon Chi	ΒΥΧ	April 1985	35	42	September 22, 2016	
Chi Phi	ΧΦ	December 24, 1824	58	113	November 27, 1909	
Chi Psi	ΧΨ	May 20, 1841	33	48	November 27, 1909	
Delta Chi	ΔΧ	October 13, 1890	137		1911	(Note: Joined as a junior member and became a senior member in 1912.)
Delta Kappa Epsilon	ΔΚΕ	June 22, 1844	54		November 27, 1909	
Delta Lambda Phi	ΔΛΦ	October 15, 1986	30		April 11, 2013	
Delta Phi	ΔΦ	November 27, 1827	15		November 27, 1909	
Delta Sigma Phi	ΔΣΦ	December 10, 1899	105	225	November 27, 1909	(Note: Joined as a junior member and became a senior member in 1915.)
Delta Tau Delta	ΔΤΔ	1858	133	200	November 27, 1909	
Delta Upsilon	ΔΥ	November 4, 1834	64	151	November 27, 1909	
FarmHouse	FH	April 15, 1905	33	42	1944–1971, 1981	(Note: Joined as a junior member and became a senior member on March 25, 1953. It withdrew in 1971 and later rejoined.)
Iota Nu Delta	ΙΝΔ	February 7, 1994	18	5	2007	
Iota Phi Theta	ΙΦΘ	September 19, 1963		270	1985	
Kappa Alpha Psi	ΚΑΨ	January 5, 1911		350	1982	
Kappa Alpha Society	ΚΑ Society	November 26, 1825	9	15	November 27, 1909	
Kappa Delta Phi	ΚΔΦ	April 18, 1900	14	31	1990	
Kappa Delta Rho	ΚΔΡ	May 17, 1905	36	75	1922	(Note: Joined as a junior member and became a senior member in 1929.)
Lambda Alpha Upsilon	ΛΑΥ	December 10, 1985	23	32	2025	
Lambda Chi Alpha	ΛΧΑ	November 2, 1909	185	322	1913 – October 27, 2015; November 29, 2023	
Lambda Sigma Upsilon	ΛΣΥ	April 5, 1979	44	80		
Lambda Theta Phi	ΛΘΦ	December 1, 1975		147	May 1992	
Nu Alpha Kappa	ΝΑΚ	February 26, 1988	24	24		
Omega Delta Phi	ΩΔΦ	November 25, 1987	50			
Phi Gamma Delta	ΦΓΔ and FIJI	April 22, 1848	146		November 27, 1909	
Phi Iota Alpha	ΦΙΑ	December 26, 1931	52	71		
Phi Kappa Psi	ΦΚΨ	February 19, 1852	109	158	November 27, 1909	
Phi Kappa Sigma	ΦΚΣ	October 19, 1850	45	120	November 27, 1909	
Phi Kappa Tau	ΦΚΤ	March 17, 1906	82	161	1917	
Phi Kappa Theta	ΦΚΘ	April 29, 1889	36	140	1916–1971; 1985	
Phi Mu Delta	ΦΜΔ	March 1, 1918	10	45	1923	(Note: Joined as a junior member and became a senior member on April 9, 1930.)
Phi Sigma Kappa	ΦΣΚ	March 15, 1873	84		November 27, 1909 – 2002; 2006	
Phi Sigma Phi	ΦΣΦ	July 30, 1988	9			
Pi Kappa Alpha	ΠΚΑ	March 1, 1868	225		1910	
Pi Kappa Phi	ΠΚΦ	December 10, 1904	169	231	1911	
Pi Lambda Phi	ΠΛΦ	March 21, 1895	45	120	1919–19xx ?; April 9, 1930	(Note: Was readmitted after being expelled.)
Psi Upsilon	ΨΥ	November 18, 1833	27	45	1962	
Sigma Alpha Epsilon	ΣΑΕ	March 9, 1856	215	317	November 27, 1909	
Sigma Alpha Mu	ΣΑΜ	November 26, 1909	69		1915	
Sigma Beta Rho	ΣΒΡ	August 16, 1996	41		April 15, 2007	
Sigma Chi	ΣΧ	June 28, 1855	244		November 27, 1909	
Sigma Nu	ΣΝ	January 1, 1869	161	281	November 27, 1909	
Sigma Tau Gamma	ΣΤΓ	June 28, 1920	76	165	1950	
Tau Delta Phi	ΤΔΦ	June 22, 1910	6	63	1922	(Note: Joined as a junior member and became a senior member in 1928.)
Tau Epsilon Phi	ΤΕΦ	October 19, 1910	30	144	1919	
Theta Xi	ΘΞ	April 29, 1864	42	114	1911	
Triangle		April 15, 1907	39	50	1944	
Zeta Beta Tau	ΖΒΤ	December 29, 1898	90		1912	
Zeta Psi	ΖΨ	June 1, 1847	53	87	November 27, 1909	

=== Active former members ===
Several of the historically large fraternities are no longer members of the NIC. In December 2002, Kappa Sigma (December 9), Phi Delta Theta (December 9), and Phi Sigma Kappa, withdrew their membership in the NIC due to disagreements with the strategic direction of the organization. Phi Sigma Kappa rejoined the NIC in 2006. On October 27, 2015, Lambda Chi Alpha resigned its membership, stating: "Unfortunately, the NIC has recently elected to pursue counterproductive tactics that we believe are antithetical to our values and we cannot support them." On January 14, 2016, Tau Kappa Epsilon announced that it had resigned its membership effective immediately, citing an extreme increase in cost resulting from the NIC 2.0 initiative and the obligation to ensure every member dollar is spent wisely.

On January 24, 2017, Delta Epsilon Psi resigned to focus efforts on National APIDA Panhellenic Association (NAPA), and the Panhellenic Association. Sigma Phi Epsilon announced its resignation on November 7, 2019, citing that "SigEp’s vision for how to enhance health and safety in the fraternity experience and partner with our host institutions has diverged from the NIC’s current approach."

In May 2020, five fraternities - Alpha Epsilon Pi, Alpha Sigma Phi, Alpha Tau Omega, Kappa Alpha Order, and Theta Chi - established the Fraternity Forward Coalition (FFC). Alpha Epsilon Pi, Alpha Sigma Phi, and Theta Chi have since not renewed membership in the NIC, leaving Alpha Tau Omega as the sole member of both the NIC and FFC. Gordy Heminger, a coalition organizer, stated, "We look forward to partnering with the North American Interfraternity Conference (NIC) and other similar organizations advocating on behalf of fraternities," in the FFC announcement.

Following are former members of NIC.

Fraternity	Symbols	Founding date	Active chapters	Chapters charted	NIC dates	Ref.
Alpha Epsilon Pi	ΑΕΠ	November 7, 1913	170	238	1921	(Note: Joined as a junior member and became a senior member on October 8, 1930)
Alpha Gamma Sigma	ΑΓΣ	January 28, 1923	6	9	June 19, 1971 – 2021	
Alpha Phi Delta	ΑΦΔ	November 5, 1914	36	96	1926–2016	(Note: Joined as a junior member and became a senior member in 1930.)
Alpha Sigma Phi	ΑΣΦ	December 6, 1845	161	212	November 27, 1909	(Note: NIC founding member)
Delta Epsilon Psi	ΔΕΨ	1998	16	39	19xx ? – January 24, 2017	
Delta Psi	ΔΨ	January 17, 1847	10	19	1911	
Kappa Alpha Order	ΚΑ Order	December 21, 1865	129	181	November 27, 1909 – January 31, 2020	
Kappa Sigma	ΚΣ	December 10, 1869	299	428	November 27, 1909 – 2002	
Lambda Chi Alpha	ΛΧΑ	November 2, 1909	185	322	1913 – October 27, 27, 2015	
Lambda Phi Epsilon	ΛΦΕ	February 25, 1981	33	48	September 8, 1990 – 2020	
Phi Beta Sigma	ΦΒΣ	January 9, 1914		400	2008	
Phi Delta Theta	ΦΔΘ	December 26, 1848	190	260	November 27, 1909 – 2002	
Phi Lambda Chi	ΦΛΧ	March 15, 1925	9	17	1964–2020	(Note: Joined as a junior member.)
Sigma Lambda Beta	ΣΛΒ	April 4, 1986	99	118	1992–2020	
Sigma Phi Delta	ΣΦΔ	April 11, 1924	25	41	2006	
Sigma Phi Epsilon	ΣΦΕ	November 1, 1901	221	374	November 27, 1909 – November 7, 2019	
Sigma Phi	ΣΦ	March 4, 1827	9	7	November 27, 1909	
Sigma Pi	ΣΠ	February 26, 1897	120	216	1910	
Tau Kappa Epsilon	ΤΚΕ	January 10, 1899	229	481	1915 – January 14, 2016	
Tau Phi Sigma	ΤΦΣ	November 11, 1992	7	8	19xx ? –2020	
Theta Delta Chi	ΘΔΧ	October 31, 1847	29	66	November 27, 1909	
Theta Chi	ΘΧ	April 10, 1856	164	244	1912	

=== Defunct former members ===
Several former NIC members have gone inactive or have merged with other members of the NIC and thus no longer have been counted as members.

Fraternity	Symbols	Founding date	Chartered chapters	NIC dates	Ref.
Alpha Kappa Pi	ΑΚΠ	January 1, 1921	36	1931 – September 6, 1946	(Note: Joined as a junior member)
Alpha Lambda Tau	ΑΛΤ	1916	23	1928	
Beta Kappa	ΒΚ	October 15, 1901	47	1926 – April 14, 1942	(Note: Joined as a junior member and became a senior member in 1928.)
Beta Sigma Rho	ΒΣΡ	October 12, 1910	15	1947 – December 12, 1972	(Note: Joined as a junior member and became a senior member in 1955.)
Delta Alpha Pi	ΔΑΠ	November 22, 1919	6	1927 – October 21, 1935	
Delta Sigma Lambda	ΔΣΛ	September 9, 1921	12	1927 – March 27, 1937	
Kappa Nu	ΚΝ	November 12, 1911	27	1920–1934	(Note: Dropped from NIC in 1934. Merged into Phi Epsilon Pi on October 14, 1961.)
Omicron Alpha Tau	ΟΑΤ	April 1912	21	1928–1934	
Phi Alpha	ΦΑ	October 14, 1914	33	1927 – April 1959.	(Note: Joined as a junior member and became a senior member in 1928.)
Phi Beta Delta	ΦΒΔ	April 5, 1912	36	1921 – February 1, 1941	(Note: Joined as a junior member and became a senior member in 1927.)
Phi Epsilon Pi	ΦΕΠ	November 23, 1904	79	1920 – March 1970.	
Phi Kappa	ΦΚ	October 1, 1889	40	1916 – April 29, 1959	
Phi Lambda Theta	ΦΛΘ	November 18, 1920	5	1929–c. 1939	
Phi Pi Phi	ΦΠΦ	November 15, 1915	21	1925–1939	(Note: Joined as a junior member and became a senior member in 1930.)
Phi Sigma Delta	ΦΣΔ	November 10, 1909	63	1915–1969	
Phi Sigma Epsilon	ΦΣΕ	February 20, 1910	64	1953 – August 14, 1985	(Note: Joined as a junior member and became a senior member in 1965.)
Sigma Delta Rho	ΣΔΡ	January 8, 1921	9	1930 – April 1935	
Sigma Lambda Pi	ΣΛΠ	April 1915	13	1925–1932	(Note: When the fraternity ceased operations, the majority of its chapters joined Phi Epsilon Pi.)
Sigma Mu Sigma	ΣΜΣ	March 25, 1921	22	1928–1934	(Note: After merging, the fraternity was later revived.)
Sigma Tau Phi	ΣΤΦ	1918	7	1930 – March 1947	
Theta Kappa Nu	ΘΚΝ	June 9, 1924	55	1925–1939	(Note: Joined as a junior member and became a senior member in 1928.)
Theta Kappa Phi	ΘΚΦ	October 1, 1919	23	1924 – April 29, 1959	(Note: Joined as a junior member and became a senior member in 1946.)
Theta Upsilon Omega	ΘΥΩ	December 1, 1923	17	1924 – April 23, 1938	(Note: Joined as a junior member and became a senior member in 1928.)

== See also ==
- Fraternity and Sorority Political Action Committee
- North American fraternity and sorority housing
- List of social fraternities
