= Alpha Gamma Sigma =

Alpha Gamma Sigma may refer to:

- Alpha Gamma Sigma (fraternity), a social and professional fraternity in agriculture in the US
- Alpha Gamma Sigma (honor society), an honor society for students in California community colleges
