= Abdul Aziz Said =

Syrian-American academic (1930–2021)

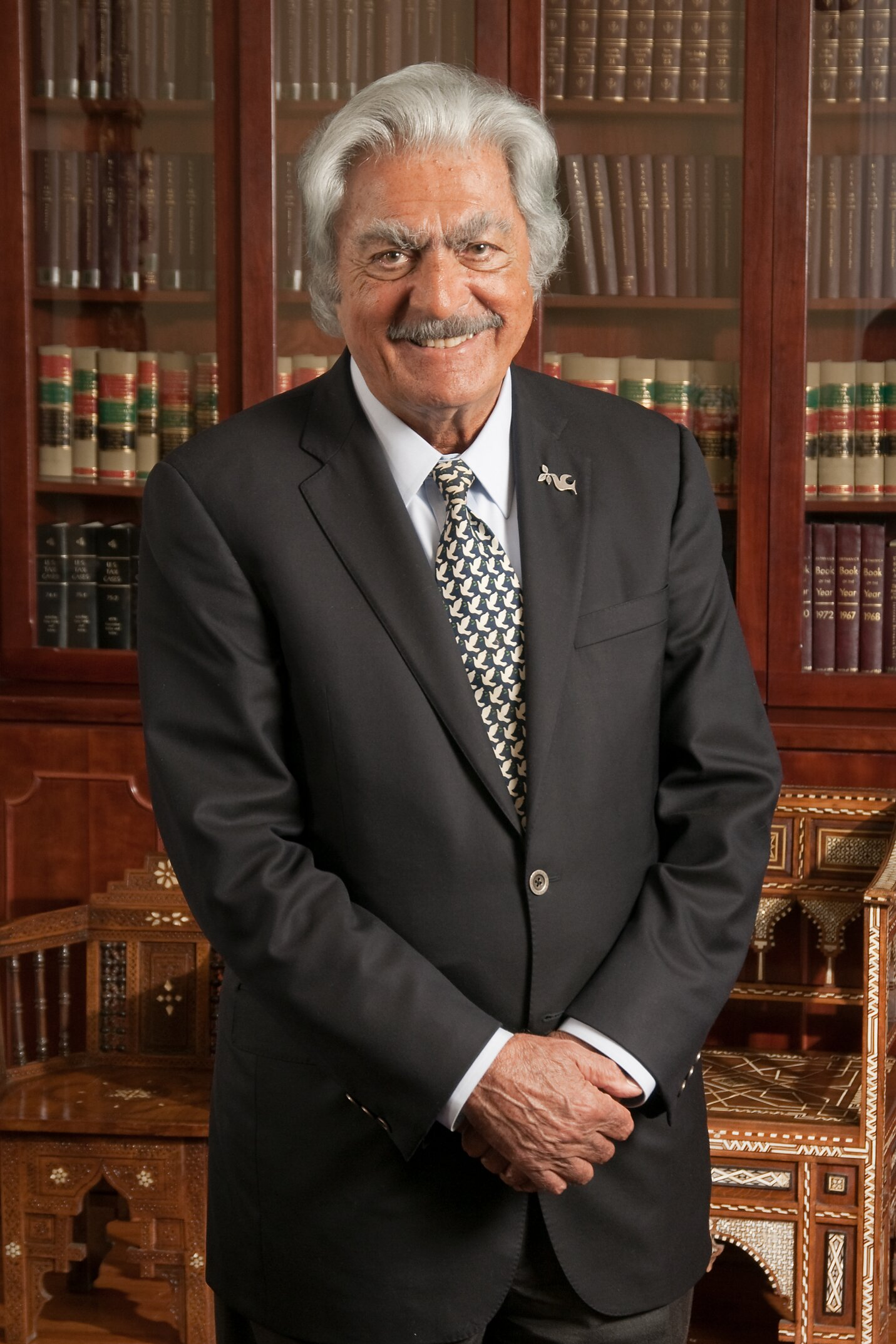
- Born: September 1, 1930
- Died: January 22, 2021 (aged 90)
- Education: American University
- Occupation: Professor
- Years active: 1956–2015
- Employer(s): School of International Service, American University
- Website: https://abdulazizsaidamericanu.org/

Abdul Aziz Said (September 1, 1930 – January 22, 2021) was Professor Emeritus of International Relations in the School of International Service at American University, Washington, D.C. He was the founding Director of the university's International Peace and Conflict Resolution program. Said was viewed as a trailblazer in his field. Well known for shifting the focus of International Relations theory from real politic-based on the concept that the law of power governs states, to new world order theories based on cooperation and common security. Starting in the late 1980s Said increasingly focused his work on human rights, conflict resolution, and later explored the relationship between spirituality and religion in international politics.

Dr. Said was the first occupant of the Mohamed Said Farsi Chair of Islamic Peace and director emeritus and Founder of the Center for Global Peace. AU called him its “Living Legend of Peace” and he was referred to as "a singular institution promoting peace" by the Washington Post Magazine. As an advisor to nongovernmental organizations and governments, Said actively engaged in many conflict resolution efforts, including the Israeli-Palestinian peace talks and the Iraqi conflict.

== Background ==
=== Early years ===
Abdul Aziz Said Ishaq was born in Amuda, Syria in 1930 to Said Ishaq and Shemsa Khacho. Said Ishaq, a Syriac Orthodox Christian, was a businessman, landowner, and political leader who served in the Syrian Parliament for nearly 30 years. Said's childhood was characterized by upheaval and violence due to the Syrian struggle against French colonialism and World War II. His family was forced to flee to Damascus in 1936 when Amuda was burned to the ground and two years later was relocated by French authorities to Aleppo, Syria. When he was nine years old, Said's three-year-old brother, Riyad, was killed by a French military truck and he carried the dying toddler home. This and other experiences left Said with a lifelong revulsion of war and later his professional commitment to nonviolence. His mother died later that year, and his father was exiled by the French due to his affiliation with the Syrian Nationalist movement. Said and his five siblings were left under the care of his paternal grandmother, and he had vivid recollections of constant bombing in Aleppo during this period as British forces attempted to dislodge the Vichy French during World War II.

=== Education ===
As the son of a prominent leader of the Syrian Nationalist movement, Dr. Said was forced to attend French schools in keeping with France's mission civilisatrice. All of his grammar and secondary school education was in French. In 1947, Said left Syria to attend the American University of Beirut's International College and two years later enrolled at The American University of Cairo (AUC). Said left AUC after one year partly due to harassment of Christian students. It was this harassment that led to his later decision to drop "Ishaq" from his name so he would be less readily identifiable as a Christian. Said decided to pursue his studies in the U.S., arriving in Washington, D.C. in 1950. He took courses at a few local universities before enrolling full time at The American University. He earned an undergraduate degree in 1954, a master's degree in 1955, and a PhD in International Relations in 1957.

== Academic career ==
Said went from being an Adjunct Faculty member in 1957 to a Full Professor by 1964, teaching in American University's new School of International Service for six of those seven years. When he retired in 2015, he held the distinction of having the longest teaching tenure at AU.

Professor Said was an iconic presence at AU. He was known for his participatory and motivational teaching style, believing that the relationship between student and teacher is best when the roles of teacher and student are repeatedly reversed. This would encourage students to see learning as a lifelong journey, teaching them how to think rather than what to think. During his tenure Said was the recipient of more than a dozen awards for outstanding teaching and university service. Former student Dr. Sheherazade Jafari observed "the passion and commitment he brought to his students year after year, and the way he'd treat everyone with such dignity and respect, recognizing their full humanity-was the greatest education I received."

During his career, Dr. Said authored 23 books and over 400 papers. He founded and directed 15 centers and institutions at AU and secured three endowed chairs for the university in Islamic Studies, Kurdish Studies, and Islamic Peace. The International Peace and Conflict Resolution (IPCR) graduate program that he founded in 1996 is one of AU School for International Studies' largest programs and is among the top-ranked IPCR programs in the U.S. Dr. Said was viewed as "one of the world's preeminent peace scholars" and received the International Studies Association's Distinguished Scholar Award in Peace Studies in 2014.

Throughout his career Said was viewed as a leader and activist on campus. For example, in 1959 Professor Said was instrumental in helping AU's Jewish students establish a Jewish fraternity, Phi Epsilon Pi, because they were excluded from fraternities due to sectarian clauses. He then served as the faculty advisor to the fraternity for over a decade. In recognition of his efforts, he was awarded the Phi Epsilon Pi "Living Legend" award in 2004. In 1970, he proposed that AU offer numerous scholarships to Black students to address the underrepresentation of minorities at the university. When former Israeli Prime Minister Yitzak Rabin received an honorary degree from AU in 1977, Said was selected to be the keynote speaker. A portion of his remarks were published in The Washington Post. Much later he was asked to give a campus-wide teach in immediately after the 9/11 attacks to reassure students.

=== International Relations ===
Dr. Said was one of the earliest scholars in the field of international relations (IR) to critique and provide alternatives to a traditional realpolitik perspective. Nearly two decades ahead of the field's expansion toward postpositivist and other approaches, Said introduced considerations on ethics and morality, non-Western viewpoints, and a more humanistic world order. His textbook Concepts of International Politics, co-authored with Charles Lerche Jr. in 1963 (first edition), details how collective moral judgments should guide foreign policy as well as how international actors have the responsibility to address internal dynamics rather than simply respond to external stimuli. Said also advocated a cooperative model of global politics and argued the U.S. must play a vital role in building trust within international relationships by encouraging "confidence in other nations to adopt institutions that authentically represent and give voice to their peoples - not because of American coercion but because of the intrinsic merit and legitimacy of the institutions themselves."

Long before these themes became mainstream within IR, Professor Said was writing about the impacts of identity, culture, ethnicity, religion and the experiences of postcolonial actors. He believed that "politics is a cultural activity and reflects tradition and environment" and used this as a guide when writing about and advising on U.S. foreign policy.

=== Human Rights and Development ===
Dr. Said's teachings on development and democracy were inexplicably connected to human rights. He specifically critiqued the way that Western conceptions of human rights overlook the critical role of culture in recognizing human dignity within diverse contexts. Advocating for global cultural pluralism as a means to cooperative development, he asserted that modernization plus humanization equals development. Said rejected the Western paradigm of democracy and capitalism and instead emphasized a global cooperation that demands the participation of all peoples. He believed only through a consensus-making process can we guarantee human dignity for all peoples and cultures. Professor Said rejected traditional theories that view peace and human rights as related but distinct issues, and instead highlighted their interconnection.

=== Peace and Conflict Resolution ===
Said was also a leading scholar of peace and conflict resolution (PCR). In 1996, Professor Said established one of the first graduate programs in international peace and conflict resolution in the U.S. at American University, despite push-back from advocates of a strictly realpolitik view of international relations. He insisted that PCR should not be relegated to a separate subfield but should be an integral part of international relations theory.

Said began teaching PCR at American University starting in the early 1980s; the courses became increasingly popular, especially the course on "Peace Paradigms" This course critiqued realist approaches in international relations and introduced alternative paradigms such as global governance, the power of nonviolence, conflict resolution through communication, and the power of "transformation" through spirituality and ethics in creating a more just world. Professor Said believed that peace educators should be practicing their peace through their pedagogy, transforming the relationship between student and teacher to one of empowerment.

=== Middle East and Africa ===
While Dr. Said did not want to be known as an Arabist, he produced books and papers on the Middle East. He was also frequently sought after by both Middle Eastern and U.S. government officials for his insights and expertise on the region. Said opposed what he saw as cultural triumphalism among U.S. policymakers, calling out examples of Western hypocrisy. He instead offered a deeper understanding of the contemporary Middle East and Africa, advocating for the pursuit of human rights across the region and a cooperative security that is locally curated rather than imposed from the outside. He asserted that the Middle East and Africa must pursue development and democracy through their own traditions and be built through local participation. Said detailed a cooperative conflict resolution strategy that abandons a competitive perspective, highlighting underlying shared needs and goals.

=== Islam ===
At a time when fear-based generalizations shaped the mainstream perspective of Islam, Professor Said was committed to articulating a more expansive understanding of the religion. His writings shed light on the culturally rooted frameworks that helped shape Islamic politics. Focused on approaches that uplift locally respected Islamic values, Said argued that "the exclusion of the people of the Middle East from active participation in political life undermines stability in the region. The reconciliation between Islam and democracy is a crucial first step toward stable progress."

Dr. Said outlined an Islamic framework that reflects historic Islamic values of peace and justice in a vision for the future. He explained how Islam centers human rights around the community structure, which differs from the traditional Western focus on individualism. This responsibility to community creates an opportunity for Muslims to "reconstruct an Islamic concept of development rooted in their own cultural values and reflecting the historical development of Islam." Dr. Said's contributions in defining Islamic precepts and practices provide guidance for contemporary Islamic peacemaking, distinguishing an Islamic framework from traditional Western secular approaches.

=== Spirituality ===
Said was interested in studying the links between spirituality and global politics, a significant departure from mainstream theories of international politics. He explained that politics are "inherently spiritual because our public life reflects our social values." According to Said, a global consensus is possible through spiritual principles, which help us to move past material and cultural differences. While Professor Said wrote extensively on the role of religion, he was careful to distinguish between religion and spirituality. While religion could contribute to division, he argued spirituality encourages a universal lens that seeks transcendence and unity.

Beginning in the mid-1970s, Professor Said's personal interest in the practice of Sufism later played an integral role in his approach to politics and his teachings. Despite its Islamic roots, Sufism is not a specific doctrine but affirms that one's inner spiritual path is linked to our role in society. Said was attracted to the idea that Sufism upholds the concept of unity without denying differences, explaining that Sufism includes "a respect for cultural pluralism that is inextricably linked to a recognition of the fundamental solidarity and connectedness of all human beings." As an alternative to the power-politics approach to war and global catastrophe, he believed this principle of unity can transform contemporary challenges through a response of love instead of fear. For Dr. Said, prioritizing individual transformation is the only path toward a humane new global system.

== Diplomatic and Public Service ==
=== Track II Diplomacy ===
In addition to his academic career, Professor Said engaged in Track II diplomacy and served as an advisor to U.S. and foreign government officials as well as international organizations. He traveled for an advised the U.S. State and Defense departments and engaged in conflict resolution efforts on behalf of the U.S. and non-governmental organizations (NGOs).

Professor Said was one of the early participants of U.S. public diplomacy efforts through the U.S. government's various iterations of public diplomacy: The Bureau of Educational and Cultural Affairs (BECA), the United States Information Services (USIS), and the United States Information Agency (USIA) for over 30 years. In the early 1960s, Said became known to the U.S. State Department through his lectures at U.S. military academies and at the Defense Department. In 1964, the State Department sent him on his first official lecture tour to five Arab and three African countries where he spoke on U.S. foreign policy and U.S. domestic politics. Being a naturalized U.S. citizen, the U.S. government viewed Said as an especially effective speaker because he represented the “successful immigrant” story, embodying the American Dream. The fact that he could lecture in both Arabic and French was an added benefit. Said was asked regularly to participate in these public diplomacy tours and he lectured in the Middle East, Europe, and Central and South America. During these trips, Said often met with foreign government officials and served as a go-between for the in-country U.S. ambassador when requested.

=== Advisory ===
Said also served as an advisor and consultant to various U.S. administrations, NGOs, and intergovernmental organizations such as the United Nations. He briefed the Clinton Administration's National Security Council on Islamic Fundamentalism, served on President Carter's Committee on the Islamic World, was a member of the George W. Bush Administration's Future of Iraq Project, and served as an advisor to President Obama's Assistant Secretary of State on the Arab Spring and on Syria. Said also served as an advisor on the Oslo Accords and was the co-chair of the Bureau of Intelligence and Research's “Negotiated Solutions for the Crisis in Syria” for the Geneva II Conference on Syria sponsored by the UN.

=== Peacebuilding ===
Through his Center for Global Peace (CGP) at AU, Said engaged in various conflict resolution projects between Arab countries and Israel, Turkey and Iraqi Kurds, Armenia and Azerbaijan, the Republic of Ireland and Northern Ireland, and opposition groups in Syria. Said did not limit his peacebuilding work to large international projects. For example, his CGP established a national summer peace and conflict resolution program for U.S. teachers and established a program in Washington, D.C. to teach conflict resolution skills to high school students.

== Editorial Boards ==
- American Senator
- Human Rights Quarterly
- International Journal of Nonviolence
- Journal of Peacebuilding and Development
- Peace Review
- Kosmos Journal

== Membership on Boards of Directors and/or Advisors ==
- Center for Democracy and Election Management (CDEM)
- Center for Peace Building International
- Center for the Study of the Presidency: National Committee to Unite a Divided America
- Council on Foreign Relations: Power-Sharing and Minority Rights in Iraq
- Council on US-Syrian Relations
- Creative Peace Building Initiatives
- Ecumenical Council of Washington, DC
- El Hibri Charitable Foundation
- Findhorn Foundation, Scotland
- Fulbright Senior Specialist Program
- Global Alliance for Transnational Education (GATE)
- Global Education Associates
- Human Rights International
- Institute on the United States in World Affairs
- International Association of University Presidents: U.N. Commission on Arms Control
- International Center for Religion and Diplomacy
- International Research and Exchanges Board (IREX)
- International Studies Association
- Jones International University-University of The Web
- Joint Program on Conflict Resolution (Institute for Victims of Trauma)
- Karamah – Muslim Women Lawyers for Human Rights
- Library of Congress, Search Committee for Selection of Director of Islamic Programs
- Mohamed S. Farsi Foundation
- National Peace Foundation
- National Youth Advocate Program
- Nonviolence International
- Peacebuilding & Development Institute
- Search for Common Ground
- Seven Pillars House of Wisdom
- The Omega Institute
- Washington National Cathedral Interfaith Curriculum Advisory Council
- Youth Advocate Program International

== Public Service ==
=== US Government ===
- Agency for International Development, Grantee
- Department of Defense, Consultant
- United States Institute of Peace, Workshop on Islamic Perspectives on Peace and Violence, Co-Chair
- United States Intelligence Community, Defense Intelligence School (now the National Intelligence University), Lecturer

==== Department of State ====
- Bureau of Intelligence and Research, “Negotiated Solutions for the Crisis in Syria Group,” Participant
- Democratic Principles Group, “Future of Iraq Project,” George W. Bush Administration, Member
- Foreign Service Institute, Status of Lecturer
- Undersecretary for Public Diplomacy and Public Affairs, George W. Bush Administration, Advisor

==== Defense, Lecturer ====
- Army Infantry Academy, Fort Benning
- Army Sergeant Academy, Fort Bliss
- Industrial College of the Armed Forces
- US Marine Corps and Command Academy and Staff College
- US Air Force Academy
- US Coast Guard Academy
- US Naval War College
- West Point Military Academy
- US Information Agency (USIA), “Speaker and Specialist Program,” Lecturer throughout the Middle East and Persian Gulf, Europe, Latin and South America, North, East, and Sub-Saharan Africa, and Southeast Asia (1964-1999)

==== White House ====
- “Committee on the Islamic World,” Member, President Jimmy Carter Administration
- Executive Office of the President, National Security Council, “Islam and US Foreign Policy,” Presenter, President Bill Clinton Administration
- White House Annual Conference on Children and Youth, “Youth and Bureaucracy,” Presenter, President Richard Nixon Administration

=== International Public Service ===
- Arab-Israeli Peace Dialogues (various Tunis, US, Austria, Jordan), Participant
- Omani Minister of State for Foreign Affairs, Diplomatic Institute, Committee Member

==== United Nations ====
- Development Programme, Consultant
- Educational, Scientific, and Cultural Organization (UNESCO), Consultant

== University Service ==
- Committee on Academic Development, Chair
- Faculty Relations Committee of the American University, Member and Chair
- Library Committee of the American University, Chair
- Presidential Search Committee of The American University, Member
- School of International Service Term Faculty Action Committee, Member and Chair
- School of International Service, International Relations Sub-Faculty, Chair
- School of International Service, President of Faculty
- School of International Service, Rank and Tenure Committee, Member and Chair
- The American University Faculty Senate, Member and Chair
- The American University, The Scholar Diplomat Program, Moderator
- University Admissions Committee, Member and Chair
- Various School of International Service Faculty Search Committees, Chair

== Programmatic Contributions ==
Contributions include developing the following educational, research and outreach programs and activities:

- AU Center for Global Peace
- Center for Cooperative Global Development
- Center for Mediterranean Studies
- Community for Social Change and Political Participation in the Middle East and Africa
- Consortium PhD in Islamic Studies, greater Washington consortium
- Creative Peacebuilding Initiatives
- International Peace Studies and Conflict Resolution
- Project PEN: Peace and Conflict Resolution Education for Public School Students in Washington, DC
- Islamic Peace Studies
- Mohamed Said Farsi Chair of Islamic Peace
- Summer Institute for Teachers: Education for Global Citizenship
- Washington Semester in International Peace and Conflict Resolution
- Washington Semester in Islam and World Affairs
- Washington Semester in Foreign Policy

== Honors, Awards, and Fellowships ==
=== Awards ===
- Delta Phi Epsilon Pi, “Award for Service and Excellence”
- “El-Hibri Peace Education Prize,” First Recipient (2007)
- The Inter-American Defense College, “Diploma Honoris Causa” Continental Defense
- International Political Science Association, “Teh-Kuang Chang Award for Outstanding Scholar on Asian and Pacific Studies Award” (2018)
- International Studies Association, “Distinguished Scholar of Peace Studies Award”
- The Mahatma Gandhi Foundation, Fourth Annual “Fellowship of Peace Award” (2007)
- Mortar Board, “Outstanding Faculty Award”
- The National Endowment for Democracy, Grantee
- Phi Epsilon Pi National Jewish Fraternity, “Living Legend Award” (2004)
- Search for Common Ground, “Certificate of Appreciation for Extraordinary Service”
- The Rockefeller Foundation, Grantee
- The United States Institute of Peace, Grantee
- United States House of Representatives, “House Speaking Series Award”
- Young Presidents’ Organization, Named among the “Top 200 YPO Lecturers Internationally”
- Who's Who in America, 43rd Edition, Listed

=== Scholarships and Named Funds ===
- Abdul Aziz Said Chair in International Peace and Conflict Resolution, American University
- Abdul Aziz Said Graduate Scholarship in Peace and Conflict Resolution Studies, American University
- Abdul Aziz Said Peace and Conflict Resolution Fund, American University
- Abdul Aziz Said Phi Epsilon Pi Scholarship, American University

=== American University Awards ===
- African Students’ Association Award
- “Darrell Randall Award for Outstanding Service to the University”
- Distinguished Service in the School of International Service: 1957-2015 (2015)
- Distinguished Service to the university, College of Public Affairs
- Faculty Excellence Award
- Golden Eagles Reunion, Honorary Chairman (2009)
- Graduate Student Association, “Outstanding Service Award”
- Honors Program, Honors Professor of the Year (2007–2008)
- Outstanding Contribution to Academic Development
- Outstanding Scholarship, Research and Professional Contributions (2009)
- Office of Multicultural Affairs, “Multicultural Award”
- School of International Service Fall Annual Dinner, Honoree (2006)
- University Faculty Outstanding Service
- Washington Semester Program, “Best Speaker Award”

== Selected works ==
- Minding the Heart, Forthcoming.
- Jafari, Sheherazade; Said, Abdul Aziz (2011). "Islam and Peacemaking" (PDF). In Allen Nan, Susan; Mampilly, Zachariah Cherian; Bartoli, Andrea (eds.). Peacemaking: From Theory to Practice. Praeger security international. Vol. 1. Santa Barbara, CA: Praeger. ISBN 9780313375774. OCLC 715288234.
- Said, Abdul Aziz; "Localizing Peace: An Agenda for Sustainable Peacemaking," (co-authored with Nathan Funk), Peace and Conflict Studies, Spring 2010, 17.1.
- Said, Abdul Aziz; Funk, Nathan C (2010). "Toward Global Community: Sufism and World Order" (PDF). Religious Studies and Theology. 29 (1). London: Equinox Publishing: 93–108. doi:10.1558/rsth.v29i1.93. ISSN 0829-2922. OCLC 61311974.
- Funk, Nathan C; Said, Abdul Aziz (October 30, 2008). Islam and Peacemaking in the Middle East. Boulder, CO: Lynne Rienner Publishers. ISBN 9781588265692. OCLC 255039046.
- Said, Abdul Aziz; Abu-Nimer, Mohammed; Sharify-Funk, Meena (2006). Contemporary Islam: Dynamic, Not Static. New York: Routledge. ISBN 9780203965382. OCLC 466532090.
- Said, Abdul Aziz; Peace as a Human Right: Towards an Integrated Understanding, (co-authored with Charles Lerche) in Human Rights and Conflict: Exploring the Links Between Rights, Law, and Peacebuilding (Eds.) Julie Mertus and Jeffrey W. Helsing, United States Institute of Peace, December 2006.
- Said, Abdul Aziz; Contemporary Islam: Dynamic, Not Static, co-edited with Meena Sharify-Funk and Mohammed Abu-Nimer, 2006.
- Said, Abdul Aziz; Bridges, Not Barriers, Essays on Exploring a Global Dream, The Fetzer Institute, Summer 2006, Essay Number 1.
- Said, Abdul Aziz; The World of Islam, with Abdul Karim Bangura. Pearson Custom Publishing, 2004.
- Said, Abdul Aziz; Sharify-Funk, Meena, eds. (2003). Cultural Diversity and Islam. Lanham, MD: University Press of America. ISBN 9780761825227. OCLC 52090456.
- Said, Abdul Aziz; Funk, Nathan C; Kadayifici, Ayse, eds. (2001). Peace and Conflict Resolution in Islam: Precept and Practice. Lanham, MD: University Press of America. ISBN 9780761820062. OCLC 46421886.
- Said, Abdul Aziz; "Vision 20/20: Future of the Middle East," editor, Search for Common Ground, 2001.
- Said, Abdul Aziz; Lerche Jr, Charles O; Lerche III, Charles O (1995) [1963]. Concepts of International Politics in Global Perspective (4th ed.). Prentice Hall. ISBN 9780131746404. OCLC 4496450.
- Nachmanovitch, Stephen; Said, Abdul Aziz (1987). "Global Thinking: A call for reinvestment in sacred values". ACORN, A Gandhian Review. 2 (1). Eastern Illinois University.
- Said, Abdul Aziz, ed. (1978). Human Rights and World Order. New Brunswick, NJ: Transaction Books. ISBN 9780878557189. OCLC 4076147.
- Said, Abdul Aziz (1977). Ethnicity and U.S. Foreign Policy. Praeger special studies. New York: Praeger Publishers. ISBN 9780030218064. OCLC 728955501.
- Said, Abdul Aziz; Simmons, Luiz R. S., eds. (1976). Ethnicity in an International Context: The Politics of Disassociation. New Brunswick, NJ: Transaction Books. ISBN 9780878551101. OCLC 440779752.
- Simmons, Luiz R. S.; Said, Abdul Aziz, eds. (1974). Drugs, politics, and diplomacy: The International Connection. International yearbooks of drug addiction and society. Beverly Hills, CA: SAGE Publications. ISBN 9780803902213. OCLC 1153420.
- Said, Abdul Aziz; Protagonists of Change: Subcultures in Development and Revolution, ed., Spectrum Books, Prentice-Hall, 1971.
- Said, Abdul Aziz; Simmons, Luiz R. S., eds. (1971). The New Sovereigns: Multinational Corporations as World Powers. A Spectrum book. Englewood Cliffs, NJ: Prentice-Hall. ISBN 9780136157991. OCLC 234088427.
- Said, Abdul Aziz, ed. (1970). America's world role in the 70's. A Spectrum book. Englewood Cliffs, NJ: Prentice-Hall. ISBN 9780130325730. OCLC 64770.
- Said, Abdul Aziz; Collier, Daniel M (1968). Revolutionism. Boston, MA: Allyn & Bacon. OCLC 124780.
- Said, Abdul Aziz (1968). The African Phenomenon. Boston, MA: Allyn & Bacon. OCLC 413196.
- Said, Abdul Aziz, ed. (1968). Theory of International Relations: The Crisis of Relevance. Englewood Cliffs, NJ: Prentice-Hall. OCLC 443332.
