= Phi Lambda Chi =

American collegiate fraternity

- ΦΛΧ
- Founded: March 15, 1925; 101 years ago University of Central Arkansas
- Type: Social
- Affiliation: Independent
- Former affiliation: NIC
- Status: Active
- Scope: National
- Motto: "Ever Onward"
- Colors: Blue and Gold
- Flower: White Carnation
- Mascot: Lion
- Publication: The Aztec
- Philanthropy: Arkansas Children's Hospital
- Chapters: 9
- Nickname: Phi Lamb
- Former name: Aztec
- Headquarters: 14524 Cantrell Road Ste. 140; Little Rock, Arkansas 72223; United States
- Website: www.philamb.net

Phi Lambda Chi (ΦΛΧ), colloquially known as Phi Lamb, is a social collegiate fraternity founded at the Arkansas State Teachers College (now the University of Central Arkansas) in 1925. It was formerly a member of the North American Interfraternity Conference (NIC).

== History ==
Phi Lambda Chi originated as the Lamb Society, a social fraternal organization formed in 1920 for high school boys. After the majority of its members had graduated from high school and enrolled in college, the Lamb Society decided to discontinue the group and form a new collegiate secret society.

Nine members of the Lamb Society and three new recruits organized Aztec at the Arkansas State Teachers College (now the University of Central Arkansas) on March 15, 1925. Aztec's founding members were Thomas Lester Adair, Robert B. Clark, Grant H. Collar, Wendell H. Collums, Marvin Crittenden, Evan M. Douglas, William E. Huddleston, J. Louis Moles, Doyle L. Patton, B. Howard Perrin, Jeff D. Shemwell, and Robert L. Taylor.

Aztec changed its name to Phi Lambda Chi in 1930 after the college began allowing local Greek letter organizations. By 1934 when the college began to allow national fraternities, the Phi Lambda Chi/Aztec had more than 300 alumni. Phi Lambda Chi voted to nationalize and elected a provisional Grand Council on January 19, 1939. The council was tasked with developing a national fraternity consisting of at least three chapters that would qualify for membership in the Association of Teachers College Fraternities.

The council created a provisional constitution and voted to charter the local Phi Lambda Chi fraternity as the Alpha chapter of the national fraternity. The fraternity was established for students from regional and teaching colleges. The Beta chapter was added at Northeastern State University in 1939, followed by the Gamma chapter at the University of Arkansas at Monticello in 1940.

Phi Lambda Chi held its first conclave from March 15 to 16, 1940, at the Arkansas State Teachers College. At this meeting, members approved a permanent constitution. Later, the fraternity expanded from its original teacher mission, opening its membership to students from any college or university in the United States.

The Aztec, the fraternity's magazine, honors its founding local organization. Its national philanthropy is the Arkansas Children's Hospital. In addition, chapters are required to partner with local charities to complete fifteen service hours per member.

== Symbols ==
The fraternity's colors are blue and gold. Its flower is the white carnation and its mascot lion. Its motto is "Ever Onward." The Phi Lambda Chi coat of arms features "two vicious lions poised on either side against a shield, which has at its upper extremity a Grecian helmet and, at its lower extremity, a scroll bearing the Greek name of the Fraternity. Diagonally across the shield is a solid bar separating the eye in the upper right-hand comer from the crossed sabers in the lower left-hand comer."

The fraternity's Order of the Scroll or new member pin is a blue shield with a central gold disc. Its badge is worn by fully initiated members, called the Order of the Shield, and features a blue background decorated with gold symbols and a gold border. There is also a badge for alumni or Order of the Lion members which is similar to the badge, except for a border of pearls.

== Chapters ==
Active chapters noted in bold, inactive chapters noted in italics.:

Chapter	Charter date and range	Institution	Location	Status	Ref.
Alpha	March 25, 1925 – 1995, 2008–2015	University of Central Arkansas	Conway, Arkansas	Inactive	(Note: Formed as the local group, Aztec, in 1925, changing its name to Phi Lambda Chi in 1930.) (Note: Reformed as a colony in 2005.)
**Beta**	1939	Northeastern State University	Tahlequah, Oklahoma	Active	
**Gamma**	1940	University of Arkansas at Monticello	Monticello, Arkansas	Active	
Delta	1941–1948	Southeastern Louisiana University	Hammond, Louisiana	Inactive	(Note: Chapter started as Phi Kappa Pi.)
**Epsilon**	1946	Henderson State University	Arkadelphia, Arkansas	Active	
Zeta	1950–1960	Pittsburg State University	Pittsburg, Kansas	Inactive	(Note: Chapter started as a colony in 1949.)
Eta	1954–1959	University of Central Oklahoma	Edmond, Oklahoma	Inactive	
Theta	1958–1961	University of Arkansas-Little Rock	Little Rock, Arkansas	Inactive	
Iota	1961–1965	Northwest Missouri State University	Maryville, Missouri	Inactive	(Note: Chapter started as a colony in 1959.)
Kappa	1960–1961, 1964–201x ?	Northwestern Oklahoma State University	Alva, Oklahoma	Inactive	
Lambda	1969–2002	Truman State University	Kirksville, Missouri	Inactive	(Note: Chapter started as a colony in 1968.)
**Mu**	1976	Arkansas Tech University	Russellville, Arkansas	Active	(Note: Chapter formed by absorbing the Cavaliers Club which was originally established in 1964.)
**Nu**	1977	Southern Arkansas University	Magnolia, Arkansas	Active	
Xi	1991–2000	Lincoln University (Missouri)	Jefferson City, Missouri	Inactive	
**Sigma**	1993–1994, 2000	University of Science and Arts of Oklahoma	Chickasha, Oklahoma	Active	(Note: Chapter formed from Sigma Psi. Reestablished as a colony in 1999.)
Chi	2005–2011	Cameron University	Lawton, Oklahoma	Inactive	
Pi	2009–2014	Louisiana State University Shreveport	Shreveport, Louisiana	Inactive	
**Tau**	2013	Texas A&M University–Texarkana	Texarkana, Texas	Active	
Rho	2014-2022	Keene State College	Keene, New Hampshire	Inactive	(Note: Chapter created by absorbing Sigma Lambda Chi which was originally established in 1985.)
**Phi**	2017	Lindenwood University	St. Charles, Missouri	Active	(Note: Chapter formed by absorbing Phi Lambda Phi which was originally established in 2005.)
**Upsilon**	2024	Missouri Western State University	St. Joseph, Missouri	Active	

== Notable members ==
- Bill John Baker – chief of the Cherokee Nation
- Cliff Hoofman – justice of the Arkansas Supreme Court
- Jim Ross – professional wrestling commentator

== Award winners ==
The highest individual honor available to an individual member of Phi Lambda Chi is the Bobby J. Thompson Excelsior Award. The award has been given just six times since the founding of the fraternity.

- K. Michael Baker (Gamma Chapter)
- William R. "Doc" Murray (Lambda Chapter)
- Bobby J. Thompson (Beta Chapter)
- David M. Mayes (Mu Chapter)
- James E. Dick (Beta Chapter)
- Paul T. Smith (Gamma Chapter)

== See also ==
- List of social fraternities and sororities
