= Mubarak Awad =

Palestinian-American psychologist and advocate

- مبارك عواد
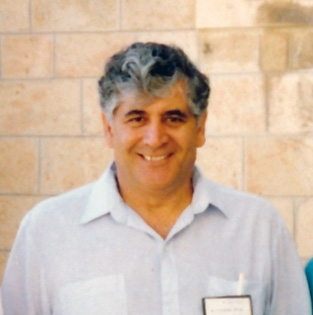
- Awad in 1993
- Born: 1943 (age 82–83); Jerusalem
- Occupations: Psychologist, activist

Mubarak Awad (Arabic: مبارك عواد) is a Palestinian-American psychologist and an advocate of nonviolent resistance.

== Early life and move to the United States ==
Awad, a Palestinian Christian (a member of the Greek Orthodox Church), was born in 1943 in Jerusalem when it was under the British Mandate. When Awad was five years old, his father was killed during the 1948 Arab–Israeli War and he became a refugee in the Old City of Jerusalem. His mother was a pacifist and argued against revenge. He was offered the right to Israeli citizenship in 1967 when East Jerusalem was annexed by Israel after the Six-Day War. He refused the offer of citizenship with Israel and kept his Jordanian citizenship.

Mennonite and Quaker missionaries influenced Awad's views in his youth. In the 1960s he moved to the United States to study at the Mennonite Bluffton University and received a BA in social work and sociology. He went on to obtain an MS in education from Saint Francis University and a PhD in psychology from the International Graduate School of Saint Louis University.

He was granted U.S. citizenship in 1978 and settled in a small town in Ohio.

== Career ==
=== National Youth Advocate Program ===
Awad was the founder and former president of the National Youth Advocate Program (NYAP) in the United States. The organization developed from the Ohio Youth Advocate Program (OYAP) established by Awad in 1978 with support from the Ohio Youth Commission (now the Department of Youth Services), the state department responsible for finding placements for "at risk" youth referred to the state from county juvenile courts.

As an offshoot of NYAP, he later founded and directed Youth Advocate Program International, headquartered in Washington, DC. According to the website, "The Youth Advocate Program International, Inc. (YAP International) is a 501(c)(3) non-profit organization. It established its headquarters and advocacy center in Washington, DC in 1996. YAP International's mission is to promote and protect the rights and well-being of the world's youth, giving particular attention to children victimized by conflict, exploitation, and state and personal violence."

=== Palestinian Centre for the Study of Nonviolence ===
In 1983 Awad returned to Jerusalem and established the Palestinian Centre for the Study of Nonviolence (PCSN). Before the intifada, Awad published papers and lectured on nonviolence as a technique for resisting the Israeli occupation. He wrote that nonviolence could be used as a means of resistance. The Centre also sponsored a number of nonviolent actions during the early months on the first intifada. Among the tactics employed was the planting of olive trees on proposed Israeli settlements, asking people not to pay taxes and encouraging people to eat and drink Palestinian products. In the Middle East he is often referred to as the Arab Gandhi due to the similarity between his teachings of the power of nonviolence and those of Mahatma Gandhi in India during the British Raj. He believed these tactics could be used to resist the Israeli military occupation. He also drew upon the methodologies of Gene Sharp's trilogy, The Politics of Non-Violence. Using this knowledge and his experience, Awad prepared his own "12-page blueprint for passive resistance in the territories," eventually published in the Journal of Palestine Studies. He has translated into Arabic the teachings of Mohatma Gandhi and Martin Luther King. In 1998 Mubarak Awad's nephew, Sami Awad founded the Holy Land Trust (HLT) out of PCSN.

==== Deportation by Israel ====
In 1987, Awad attempted to renew the residency permit he had been issued in 1967. His application was declined and he was ordered to leave the country when his tourist visa expired. Awad claimed, with support from U.S. consular officials, that under international conventions Israel did not have the right to expel him from his place of birth and he refused to leave. The Israeli government stayed the deportation order mainly at the insistence of the U.S. In May 1988, Prime Minister Yitzhak Shamir ordered Awad arrested and expelled. Officials charged that Awad broke Israeli law by inciting "civil uprising" and helping to write leaflets that advocated civil disobedience that were distributed by the leadership of the First Intifada. No evidence was provided to support the charge and Awad appealed the decision to the Supreme Court. The court ruled that he had forfeited his right to residence status in Israel when he became a U.S. citizen and he was deported in June 1988. U.S. Secretary of State George Shultz's appeal to Shamir to revoke the deportation order was declined. Ian Lustick, professor of political science at the University of Pennsylvania, cited the ruling in Awad's case as one of a number of examples that he argues demonstrate that "[t]here has never been an official act that has declared expanded East Jerusalem as having been annexed by the State of Israel."

=== Criticism ===
Critics argue that Awad advocated violence under the guise of calling it civil disobedience. In a 1984 article for the Journal of Palestine Studies, Awad stated, "for the Palestinians living in the West Bank and Gaza the most effective strategy is nonviolence. This does not apply to the Palestinians living outside. Nor is it a rejection of the concept of armed struggle," and that "This is a total and serious struggle, nothing short of a real war." Awad called to "block roads, prevent communications, cut electricity, telephone, and water lines, prevent the movement of equipment, and in other ways obstruct the government." Awad's article called for a campaign of harassment against Israelis and for "psychological warfare" to "demoralize" Israeli soldiers. He also called for "the destruction of Israeli fences and power lines built across Arab land," according to Time magazine.

Awad has called for Israel to be replaced with Palestine. In a Jerusalem speech to Palestinian students he said "the PLO wants the entire Palestine and I agree. Palestine for me is the Galilee, Akko, Ashdod, everything. This is Palestine for me." He went on to say that "I feel that there would be no peace without us having a Palestinian state. In the beginning not all of Palestine, but in years to come there would be an agreement of Palestine/Israel. There would be one state. Arabs would call it Palestine and Israelis or Jews would call it Israel." Dr. Shlomo Riskin, founding chief rabbi of the Israeli settlement of Efrat in the West Bank, called him "an articulate wolf in sheep`s clothing" who "clearly represents a threat to the lives of Israeli citizens." Israeli diplomat Moshe Arad in a New York Times article decried Awad who he claimed took American citizenship, in accordance with immigration law, which required that he 'intends to reside permanently in the U.S. and then turned around and claimed to the Israeli Supreme Court that his intention was always to reside in Jerusalem. "Nonviolence as merely a convenient tactic... incitement and acts of violence - are these the watchwords of a man truly committed to peace and moderation? No. Western audiences do not hear these Awad views in English. But his local audiences hear them in Arabic," Arad said.

=== Nonviolence International ===
In 1989, Awad founded Nonviolence International, a non-governmental organization in Special Consultative Status with the United Nations Economic and Social Council. Nonviolence International's stated mission is to promote nonviolent action and seek to reduce the use of violence worldwide.

=== Academic career ===
Awad has taught at the American University in Washington, D.C. since the early 1990s. He is an adjunct professor in the School of International Service where he teaches classes in the theories and methods of nonviolence.

== See also ==
- Palestinian Christians
- List of peace activists

== Sources ==
- "About Us". Nonviolence International. 2011.
- "About Youth Advocate Program International, Inc". Youth Advocate Program International.
- Ackerman; DuVall (2000), A Force More Powerful, OL 18516289W, Wikidata Q106367459
- "Board and Staff". Youth Advocate Program International.
- Joffe (2003). "Mubarak AwadWas Israel justified in expelling him?". Facts and Logic About the Middle East. Wikidata Q124537969.
- Lustick, Ian S. (January 1997). "Has Israel Annexed East Jerusalem?". Middle East Policy. V (1). Middle East Policy Council. Archived from the original on 1 August 2008.
- "Mubarak Awad". American University.
- "National Youth Advocate Program - Our History". National Youth Advocate Program. 2009. Archived from the original on 26 March 2010.
- Presbyterian Peace Fellowship (2008). "Palestinian Nonviolence Expert Mubarak Awad to Address June 25 Peace Breakfast". Presbyterian Peace Fellowship. Wikidata Q124537834.
- Richardson, Brent (2013). Working with Challenging Youth: Lessons Learned Along the Way. Routledge. ISBN 978-1-135-05785-5.
- Richardson, David (25 November 1983). "Confrontation Quest". The Jerusalem Post. p. 9. Archived from the original on 5 June 2011.
- Stein, Jeff (8 December 2014). "The 'Palestinian Gandhi' Who Still Believes Non-Violence is the Answer". Newsweek.
- Time (1988). "Israel Forced Exile". Time. ISSN 0040-781X. Wikidata Q124537934.
- Viorst, Milton (April 1988). "Letter from Jerusalem. Faced with a growing sense of hopelessness. the Palestinians try a new approach". Mother Jones. pp. 21–23, 55.
- "YAP International: Board of Trustees". Youth Advocate Program International. Archived from the original on 4 May 2011.

== Publications ==
- Awad, Mubarak E. (1984). "Non-Violent Resistance: A Strategy for the Occupied Territories" (PDF). Journal of Palestine Studies. 13 (4. Summer, 1984). University of California Press: 22–36. doi:10.1525/jps.1984.13.4.00p0063v.
