= Phi Sigma Delta =

American Jewish collegiate fraternity

- ΦΣΔ
- Founded: November 10, 1909; 116 years ago Columbia University
- Type: Social
- Former affiliation: NIC
- Status: Merged
- Merge date: 1970
- Successor: Zeta Beta Tau
- Emphasis: Jewish
- Scope: National
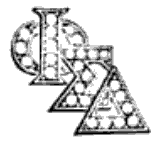
- Member badge
- Colors: White and Purple
- Publication: The Deltan
- Chapters: 63
- Headquarters: United States

Phi Sigma Delta (ΦΣΔ), colloquially known as Phi Sig, was an American collegiate fraternity established in 1909 with a predominantly Jewish membership at Columbia University. It eventually opened at least more than sixty chapters. Phi Sigma Delta merged with Zeta Beta Tau in 1970, retiring its original name.

== History ==
Phi Sigma Delta was founded at Columbia University by a group of Jewish students who previously "seemed unable to find [a] proper opportunity for the campus fellowship they were seeking.". The founding meeting was held on November 10, 1909, at Maxwell Hyman's house at 22 Mount Morris Park West in New York City. The fraternity's eight founders were William L. Berk, Herbert L. Eisenberg, Maxwell Hyman, Alfred H. Iason, Joseph Levy, Herbert K. Minsky, Joseph Shalleck, and Robert Shapiro.

The purpose of the fraternity was "to foster and nurture the comradeship of its founders." The founders met weekly at member homes, designing the constitution, ritual, and badge. Early in 1911, the fraternity initiated its first new members. By September 1911, the group secured a two-room suite chapter home in Hartley Hall, a dormitory on the Columbia campus. The fraternity was incorporated in the State of New York on June 1, 1912. In 1923, the fraternity had an office for its national headquarters in New York City.

One of the milestones of the fraternity came in 1934 when Phi Sigma Delta began a program to shelter German student refugees at various chapter houses around the country. As America entered World War II, the national manpower drain led to a standstill in the fraternity's expansion program. While some chapters suspended operations, fourteen continued to operate. After the war, alumni paid for memorial plaques for each chapter, noting those who had died during wartime service.

On April 6, 1959, Phi Alpha fraternity merged with Phi Sigma Delta, adding sixteen active chapters that were primarily located in the East. There were three campuses where both groups had a chapter; there were mergers on two campuses while one Phi Alpha chapter was released to join another fraternity. The new chapters were assigned names beginning with the Greek letter Phi.

The fraternity chartered eight more chapters in the subsequent decade. However, it considered another merger for financial and other difficulties in the later 1960s. Negotiations were successfully concluded in 1969 for Phi Sigma Delta to merge into the rapidly expanding Zeta Beta Tau fraternity. At the time of its merger, Phi Sigma Delta had 49 active chapter and 22 inactive chapters, with a total of 19,500 initiated (alumni and active) members.

== Symbols and traditions ==
The fraternity's colors are purple and white. Its badge consisted of three Greek letters ΦΣΔ joined obliquely (~angled), in gold, with twenty-four crown pearls set into the gold letters. The pledge pin was round, with a white palm and pyramid set into a purple background.

The official song was the "Phi Sigma Delta Hymn", generally known as "We Sing To Thee, Phi Sigma Delta." It was adopted in 1930. Another song written for the fraternity, c.1923, was "Phi Sigma Delta Forever," words by Herbert Morse & Herman Block and music by Nathan Grabin & Herman Block.

Its quarterly magazine was The Deltan. Phi Sigma Delta also published a member's directory, a pledge manual, and a songbook.

== Graduate clubs ==
Phi Sigma Delta had graduate clubs in Albany, New York; Chicago, Illinois; Cleveland, Ohio; Dallas, Texas; Los Angeles, California; New York City, New York; Philadelphia, Pennsylvania; and Providence, Rhode Island.

== Notable members ==
- Alan J. Altheimer (Alpha), attorney and president Jewish Council on Urban Affairs
- Eric Berg (Zeta), artist
- Arthur Levitt Sr. (Alpha), lawyer and New York State Comptroller
- Robert Q. Lewis (Eta), radio and television entertainer, comedian, game show host, and actor
- Peter Morton (Iota), co-founder of the Hard Rock Café
- Arthur Louis Schechter (Lambda), attorney and the United States Ambassador to the Bahamas
- Nelson Stamler (Upsilon), New Jersey State Senate
- Morris Weinfeld, lawyer, judge, and representative in the New York General Assembly
- Peter Yarrow (Alpha), musician and member of Peter, Paul and Mary.
- Philip Sunshine (Theta), Neonatologist

== See also ==
- List of Jewish fraternities and sororities
