= Nonviolence International South East Asia =

Nonprofit organization

Nonviolence International Southeast Asia (NISEA) is a part of Nonviolence International and was established in Bangkok in 1992 with the cooperation of regional partners, with the aim of creating a community of peace activists. It is a member of the International Action Network on Small Arms (IANSA) targeting armed violence and weapon reduction in Thailand and Cambodia respectively. In 2004, NISEA maintained a strong financial position of an income of 3.5 million Thai Baht through various grants and contributions, of which 900,000 Baht was spent on the Southeast Asia Small Arms Reduction Program. In 2005, NISEA was granted NGO in Special Consultative Status with the United Nations Economic and Social Council (ECOSOC).

== Mission ==
Nonviolence International South East Asia (NISEA) strives to shape South East Asian societies to make them choose nonviolent methods as a neutral response to conflicts. Its mission includes:

1. Increasing understanding and appreciation of nonviolent vision, strategy and methods;
2. Empowering people by enhancing capacities to protect rights and to ensure ownership of and participation in various processes affecting people's lives; and
3. Building and supporting a peace constituency that aims to change unjust structures, institutions, policies and laws through long-term nonviolent means.

== Programs ==
=== Ending Armed Violence Program ===
The Ending Armed Violence Program focuses on making communities safer through an in-depth understanding of why armed violence occurs, as well as strengthening a peace community that advocates an end to armed violence. NISEA has participated actively in various peace advocacies aiming to ban landmines, render the misuse and proliferation of arms and their impact on communities, change people's perception and behavior toward violence, engage non-state armed groups in the areas of Human Rights and International humanitarian law, seek assistance for victims and survivors of armed violence, and propagate a culture of peace. In relation to stopping the use and proliferation of small arms in Thailand, NISEA had:

1. Worked closely with other Non-governmental organizations (NGO)s and civil societies of countries to unravel and identify the presence and/or use of small arms during disappearance incidents.
2. Coordinated the Million Faces Campaign and took the lead in gathering photos and signatures to support an Arms Trade Treaty.
3. Worked with Amnesty International Thailand and the Catholic Commission for Justice and Peace of Thailand on the Million Faces Campaign.

Despite efforts made to tackle the issues of armed violence in Thailand, it was reported in 2010 that death due to armed conflicts remained prevalent of about a loss of 4,000 lives.

=== Reclaiming Rights Program ===
Reclaiming Rights Program seeks to empower marginalized persons through campaigning, networking, and solidarity work. Currently, NISEA is concerned with the conflict in Southern Thailand and is involved in creating spaces for civil society actors to have greater participation in promoting peaceful means to end violence. It also facilitates discussion and encourages suggestions with regular reports on national security issues published on its website.

=== Nonviolence in Action Program ===
Nonviolence in Action Program seeks to draw lessons and best practices to enhance capacities through education, training, and multi-media resource material development, as it believes that every individual and community has an inherent capacity to handle and prevent armed conflicts nonviolently.

== Useful Links ==
Nonviolence_International International_Action_Network_on_Small_Arms
