= Kappa Nu =

Defunct Jewish-interest collegiate fraternity

- ΚΝ
- Founded: November 12, 1911; 114 years ago University of Rochester
- Type: Social
- Former affiliation: NIC
- Status: Merged
- Merge date: October 14, 1961
- Successor: Phi Epsilon Pi
- Emphasis: Jewish
- Scope: National
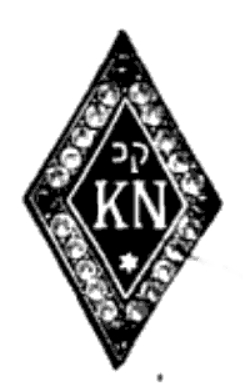
- Member badge
- Colors: Purple and White
- Symbol: Star
- Jewel: Amethyst
- Publication: Kappa Nu
- Chapters: 27
- Headquarters: Rochester, New York; United States

Kappa Nu (ΚΝ) was an American college fraternity that was active from 1911 to 1961 when it merged with Phi Epsilon Pi.

== History ==
Kappa Nu was founded at the University of Rochester on November 12, 1911. The founders were:

- Joseph Bernhardt
- Abraham Levy
- Joseph Lazarus
- Harold Leve
- Morris Lazersohn
- Louis Gottlieb

All six were pre-medical or medical students. Their intention was to create a local-only fraternity for Jewish students.

In 1917, five loosely connected groups (U of Rochester and others created by men who had left Rochester) held a convention in Rochester and set up Kappa Nu as a National Fraternity. By the 1918 convention, Kappa Nu had ten chapters. It continued to add chapters through 1931. Its executive offices were in Rochester, New York.

On October 14, 1961, Kappa Nu's thirteen active chapters voted to merge with Phi Epsilon Pi fraternity. Of these, three chapters declined to participate in the merger at campuses where Phi Epsilon Pi already existed. In 1970, Zeta Beta Tau absorbed Phi Epsilon Pi.

== Symbols ==
The badge is a diamond shield displaying a monogram of the Greek letters ΚΝ arranged horizontally along one plane below which is a six-pointed star and above which are קנ (Kuf Nun, the equivalent letters in Hebrew), standing for קשר נעורים or Kesher Neurim ("Ties of Youth"). The jeweled base of the pin is surrounded by twenty pearls with an amethyst set at each of the corners. Its colors were purple and white.

As of 1920, the fraternity had a semi-annual publication called Kappa Nu. It also published a magazine, The Reporter, three times a year.

== Chapters ==
Kappa Nu established 27 chapters.

Chapter	Charter date and range	Institution	Location	Status	Notes
Alpha	November 12, 1911 – October 14, 1961	University of Rochester	Rochester, New York	Inactive	
Beta	1915–1935; 1947 – October 14, 1961	New York University	New York City, New York	Merged (ΦΕΠ)	(Note: Chapter formed from Rho Sigma Alpha. After going dormant, it was re-established as a colony in 1946.)
Gamma	1915–1926	Columbia University	New York City, New York	Inactive	(Note: Chapter formed from Rho Sigma Beta.)
Delta	1915–1925	Union College	Schenectady, New York	Inactive	
Epsilon	1917–1934	Boston University	Boston, Massachusetts	Inactive	
Zeta	1917 – October 14, 1961	University at Buffalo	Buffalo, New York	Merged (ΦΕΠ)	
Eta	1918–1934	Harvard University	Cambridge, Massachusetts	Inactive	
Theta	March 1918–1919	New York State College for Teachers	Albany, New York	Inactive	
Iota	1918 – October 14, 1961	Union College	Schenectady, New York	Merged (ΦΕΠ)	(Note: Chapter formed from the Apollo Club, established in 1917.)
Kappa	1918 – October 14, 1961	Rensselaer Polytechnic Institute	Troy, New York	Withdrew ΖΒΤ	(Note: Became a Zeta Beta Tau chapter.)
Lambda	1919–1927	Western Reserve University	Cleveland, Ohio	Inactive	
Mu	1919–1953	University of Michigan	Ann Arbor, Michigan	Inactive	
Nu	1919 – October 14, 1961	University of Pennsylvania	Philadelphia, Pennsylvania	Withdew (ΠΛΦ)	(Note: Became a Pi Lambda Phi chapter)
Xi	1921–1932; 1948 – October 14, 1961	University of Pittsburgh	Pittsburgh, Pennsylvania	Withdrew ΖΒΤ	(Note: Chapter formed from Omega Kappa (local), established in 1920. After dormancy, it reformed as a colony in 1947.)
Omicron	1921–1934	University of Chicago	Chicago, Illinois	Inactive	(Note: Chapter formed from Rho Delta Rho, established in 1920.)
Pi	1921 – October 14, 1961	University of Alabama	Tuscaloosa, Alabama	Merged (ΦΕΠ)	(Note: Chapter formed from Alabama Club, established in 1920.)
Rho	1921–1923	University of Cincinnati	Cincinnati, Ohio	Inactive	
Sigma	1922–1956	Tulane University	New Orleans, Louisiana	Inactive	(Note: Chapter formed from Kayen Club, established in 1921.)
Tau	1922 – October 14, 1961	University of California, Berkeley	Berkeley, California	Merged (ΦΕΠ)	
Upsilon	1931–1941	University of Arkansas	Fayetteville, Arkansas	Inactive	(Note: Chapter formed from Phi Epsilon, established in 1930.)
Phi	1933 – October 14, 1961	Alfred University	Alfred, New York	Merged (ΦΕΠ)	(Note: Chapter formed from Kappa Eta Phi, established in 1930.)
Chi	1939–1942	Louisiana State University	Baton Rouge, Louisiana	Inactive	(Note: Chapter formed from Garson Club (local), established in 1927.)
Psi	1935–1937	University of Tennessee	Knoxville, Tennessee	Inactive	(Note: Chapter formed from Beta Tau Delta.)
Omega	1951–19xx ?	New York University, Washington Square	Greenwich Village, New York City, New York	Inactive	
Alpha Beta	1951 – October 14, 1961	Cornell University	Ithaca, New York	Withdrew (ΦΣΕ)	(Note: Became a Phi Sigma Epsilon chapter.)
Alpha Gamma				Unassigned	
Alpha Delta	1952 – October 14, 1961	University of California, Los Angeles	Los Angeles, California	Merged (ΦΕΠ)	(Note: Chapter formed from Delta Nu, established in 1947.)
Alpha Epsilon				Inactive	
Alpha Zeta	195x ? – October 14, 1961	City University of New York	New York City, New York	Merged (ΦΕΠ)	
Alpha Omega	1952 – October 14, 1961	Wayne State University	Detroit, Michigan	Merged (ΦΕΠ)	

== Notable members ==
- Mel Allen (Pi), play-by-play announcer for New York Yankees
- Mortimer Rogoff (Kappa), inventor and businessman

== See also ==
- List of Jewish fraternities and sororities
