= Fraternity and Sorority Political Action Committee =

American political organization

- Formation: 2005
- Headquarters: Alexandria, VA
- Official language: English
- President: Sarah Lindsay
- Executive director: Kevin O'Neill
- Lobbyist: Trent Lott
- Website: fspac.org

The Fraternity and Sorority Political Action Committee (sometimes informally known as FratPAC) is a U.S. political action committee (PAC) which focuses on issues related to freedom of association as it concerns Greek-letter organizations at American colleges and universities. It claims to be the nation's largest PAC "focused solely on higher education issues."

== Elections ==
During the 2014 election cycle, the Fraternity and Sorority Political Action Committee raised and spent $464,124, slightly less than the $466,347 it spent in 2012. In 2010 it raised and spent $404,370. The organization is funded, primarily, by United States fraternities and sororities and members of the same, and focuses its donations on federal political candidates. According to the PAC, members of Kappa Alpha Order, Lambda Chi Alpha, Kappa Alpha Theta, and Delta Gamma are among its top individual donors.

== Issues ==
The Fraternity and Sorority Political Action Committee has stated its support for several issues.

- The Fraternity and Sorority Political Action Committee (FSPAC) supports passage of the Collegiate Housing and Infrastructure Act, which would allow charitable contributions to be used to make infrastructure improvements to existing fraternity housing and to construct new fraternity housing.
- FSPAC has said it supports legislation to make students convicted of felony hazing ineligible to receive federal financial aid. At the same time, however, it opposes measures that would strip financial aid from persons "officially sanctioned" by a university, but not criminally convicted, of hazing.
- FSPAC seeks to protect the current statutory exemption of Greek-letter organizations from U.S. Title IX requirements.
- The organization supported the College Fire Prevention Act, which included privately owned fraternity housing in a program of federal matching grants to install life safety equipment on university campuses.
- FSPAC has also stated it seeks to increase the number of fraternity and sorority members serving in the U.S. Congress (currently about 25-percent of members of the U.S. House of Representatives and 40-percent of members of the U.S. Senate).

== See also ==
- North American Interfraternity Conference
