= Altheimer & Gray =

Altheimer & Gray was a Chicago-based law firm, which operated from 1914 to 2003.

== History ==
It opened in 1914 as Altheimer, Mayer, Woods, and Smith. Founding lead partner Benjamin J. Altheimer (1877-1946) was the son of Joseph and Matilda Josephat Altheimer and nephew of Arkansas planter Louis Altheimer, who established Altheimer, Arkansas. Benjamin Altheimer was a prominent Chicago Democrat.

The firm was successful for many years, and was well regarded for its transactional practice, particularly in corporate mergers and acquisitions. By 2000, it had some 300 attorneys and 300 staff members with offices in Chicago, Springfield, Illinois, and San Francisco. It also had an enviable international network with offices in London, Shanghai, Istanbul, Prague, Warsaw, Bucharest, Kyiv, and Bratislava.

The firm also had strong connections in local politics. Its last chairman, Gery Chico, had been Chief of staff to Mayor Richard M. Daley, while partner Jeremy Margolis had been an Assistant U.S. Attorney, head of the Illinois State Police, and advisor to Governor George Ryan.

However, the firm's revenue began to decline after 2000. Poor management and excessive spending left the firm in debt. Several important partners left the firm, and the remaining partners could not agree on the proper strategy for the firm. By 2003, the debts and disagreements were unsupportable, and the firm filed for bankruptcy and was dissolved.

=== Notable attorneys ===
- Mark Flessner (former)
- Alan J. Altheimer, nephew of Benjamin Altheimer who came to manage the firm

== Dissolution ==
After the dissolution of Altheimer & Gray, much of its international network joined Anglo-French firm Salans; its Kyiv and Warsaw offices switched to New York-based Chadbourne & Parke. The high-profile private equity team decamped to Chicago-based Schiff Hardin and then recently switched again to global giant Sidley Austin. Altheimer's London office joined Atlanta-based Kilpatrick Stockton but later a number of those lawyers moved to White & Case when Kilpatrick shuttered its UK operations. The San Francisco office disbanded and the partners scattered to such firms as Perkins Coie, Mayer Brown, Bingham McCutchen, and Seyfarth Shaw.

Bratislava office continued to operate for the next 8 years unaware of the parent company's dissolution.
