= Nonviolence International =

Resource center for non-violence and non-violent resistance

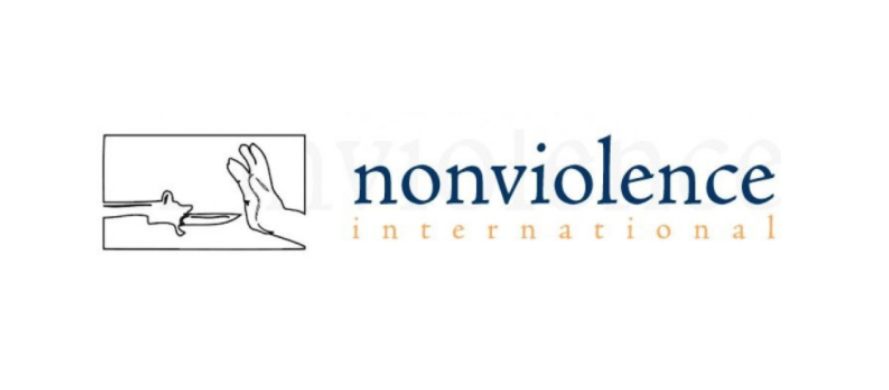
- Nonviolence International
- Founded: 1989
- Founder: Mubarak Awad Jonathan Kuttab Kamal Boulatta Abdul Aziz Said
- Type: Non-Profit; NGO
- Tax ID no.: 501(c)(3)
- Purpose: Nonviolence, activism, human rights
- Location(s): Washington, D.C. Bangkok; Jerusalem; Kyiv; Victoria; Chittagong
- Region served: Global
- Method: Education, training, support
- Key people: Michael Beer (Co-Director); Sami Awad (Co-Director)
- Employees: ~10
- Website: nonviolenceinternational.net
- Holds Special Consultative Status with the Economic and Social Council of the United Nations

Nonviolence International (NI) acts as a global network of resource centers that promote the use of nonviolence and nonviolent resistance.. NI has produced a comprehensive database of nonviolence tactics, They partner with Rutgers University to provide the large collection of nonviolence training materials.

== History ==
In 1989, Palestinian activist Mubarak Awad founded Nonviolence International along with Jonathan Kuttab, Kamal Boulatta and Abdul Aziz Said. Nonviolence International is a 501(c)(3) organization registered in Washington, DC, United States.

Their mission statement is:

"Nonviolence International advocates for active nonviolence and supports creative constructive nonviolent campaigns worldwide. We are a backbone organization of the nonviolent moment, providing fiscal sponsorship to partners all over the globe. We tell the transformative stories of dynamic emerging nonviolent movements that give us hope in difficult times and are reshaping what we view as possible. By telling these inspirational stories and supporting these movements we help to create a peaceful and just future."

In 1991, Nonviolence International coordinated anti-coup d'état training in Russia. This led to the organization's publication of the Training Manual for Nonviolent Defense Against the Coup d'État, which has since been used globally in both English and Spanish.

In 1992, Non-violence International South East Asia (NISEA) was founded in Bangkok.

In 1993 and 1994, Andre Kamenshikov partnered with Nonviolence International to found the Nonviolence International-Newly Independent States (NI-NIS), based in Moscow. NI-NIS was the first major organization to publicly warn the world about the impending war in Chechnya; the organization also released the first environmental damage assessment regarding the war in Chechnya.

During the 1995 International Campaign to Ban Landmines, NI was one of the endorsing organizations and was one of the attending parties of the Phnom Penh conference in Cambodia during June 1995. This conference was the largest anti-landmine conference to date and was the first gathering to take place in a heavily mined country (see land mines in Cambodia).

NI organized a groundbreaking consultation entitled "Mainstreaming Peace Teams" at American University in 1996. As a result, more than 50 experts from over 25 countries engaged in dialogue about unarmed civilian protection and third-party nonviolent intervention.

From 1999 to 2009, NI created programs of nonviolence and peace education in Aceh, Indonesia during the civil war (see Aceh War); the programs were led by Dr. Asna Husin, who remains a senior researcher for Nonviolence International. In 2004, a tsunami ravaged Aceh; the NI office was destroyed and several staff members were killed or injured.

Between 1991 and 2002, Director Michael Beer assisted in launching the International Burma Campaign. Beer, along with Gene Sharp and Bob Helvey, provided training in nonviolent action for over 1,000 Burmese resistance guerrillas and civilians.

NI organized the International Conference on Nonviolent Resistance, which was hosted in Bethlehem in December 2005. The conference brought together over 250 nonviolent activists from around the world, including renowned activists Gene Sharp and Bernard Lafayette.

Nonviolence International currently supports programs and partners in Western Sahara, Palestine, Ukraine, Philippines, Thailand, Canada, USA, and Uganda.

== Organization and affiliations ==
Nonviolence International operates as a collective of independent offices around the world.

International offices are located in Washington DC, West Bank, Bangkok, Kyiv and Victoria.

NVI partners and programs include: Control Arms, Center for Jewish Nonviolence, We Are Not Numbers, Holy Land Trust, US Boat to Gaza, Mennonite Action, Occupied Peoples' Forum, Green Foster Action Uganda, 10% For All, Western Sahara Solidarity Committee.

NI has affiliations with the War Resisters International, International Fellowship of Reconciliation, the International Peace Bureau, World Beyond War, and the Humanitarian Disarmament movement.

== Leadership ==
Mubarak Awad, the founder, was an adjunct professor of nonviolent resistance at American University. He was born in Jerusalem in 1943 and later attended Bluffton University. He obtained a master's degree from Saint Francis University and a PhD in Psychology from Saint Louis University. He founded the National Youth Advocate Program that recruits trains and supports foster families for children in need. In 1988, Awad was deported from Palestine for his leadership in helping spark the First Intifada; he is barred from all but short visits to his homeland.

Michael Beer, Co-Director began working with the organization in 1991. He is the author of Civil Resistance Tactics of the 2st Century available in English, Turkish, Persian, Spanish and Russian. The tactics he catalogued can be found in the Global Nonviolent Tactics Database

Jonathan Kuttab is a co-founder and prominent civil rights lawyer in Israel, Palestine and New York. Kuttab co-founded the Palestinian Center for the Study of Nonviolence and the Mandela Institute for Political Prisoners. He is also a co-founder of Al-Haq. He currently serves as the Executive Director of Friends of Sabeel, North America.

Sami Awad, Co-Director, is the founder of Holy Land Trust and the author of Sacred Awakening.
