= Alan J. Altheimer =

American lawyer

Alan J. Altheimer (September 2, 1903 – March 30, 1999) was an American lawyer with Altheimer & Gray and nonprofit leader who was the former president of the Chicago-based Jewish Council on Urban Affairs.

== Biography ==
Altheimer was born in St. Louis and raised in Little Rock, Arkansas. He is a descendent of the Altheimer brothers, who are the namesake of Altheimer, Arkansas. He studied law at Columbia University, graduating from Columbia College in 1923 and Columbia Law School in 1925. Upon being admitted to the Illinois Bar, he joined his uncle, prominent Chicago lawyer and civic leader Benjamin Altheimer's law firm, Altheimer, Mayer, Woods & Smith, which eventually became Altheimer & Gray and where he remained for the next 73 years.

Altheimer was involved in the Jewish Council on Urban Affairs, a non-profit organization that focuses on improve housing, business opportunities and education in low-income neighborhoods, shortly after it was founded and served as the organization's president. He also worked with mayor Harold Washington and Jesse Jackson to promote interracial dialogue.

Altheimer also served as president of North Shore Congregation Israel in Glencoe, Illinois. He was also a president of the Phi Sigma Delta fraternity, and the midwestern section of the Union of American Hebrew Congregations and National Jewish Welfare Board.
