= Phi Alpha (fraternity) =

Defunct American collegiate Jewish fraternity

- ΦΑ
- Founded: October 14, 1914; 112 years ago George Washington University
- Type: Social
- Former affiliation: NIC
- Status: Merged
- Merge date: April 6, 1959
- Successor: Phi Sigma Delta
- Emphasis: Jewish
- Scope: National
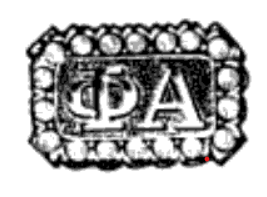
- Member badge
- Colors: Maroon and Blue
- Flower: Rose
- Publication: Phi Alpha Quarterly
- Chapters: 33
- Members: 7,000 lifetime
- Headquarters: United States

Phi Alpha (ΦΑ) was an American historically Jewish fraternity founded in 1914. It merged with Phi Sigma Delta in 1959. It was a member of the National Interfraternity Conference. It merged with Zeta Beta Tau in 1969.

== History ==
Phi Alpha was founded at George Washington University on October 14, 1914. It was a Jewish fraternity. Its founders were David Davis, Maurice H. Herzmark, Edward Lewis, Reuben Schmidt, and Hyman Shapiro. The first pledge ceremony was held in February 1915, and was followed by the establishment of a chapter house.

Dr. Edward Cafritz transferred to University of Maryland, Baltimore and helped start Beta chapter, which was installed on February 22, 1916. This was followed by Gamma chapter at Georgetown University on December 26, 1916.

In 1921, Phi Alpha became a member of the National Interfraternity Conference. In 1926, the fraternity was incorporated nationally. Its national convention was held annually during the latter part of December.

On April 6, 1959, Phi Alpha merged with Phi Sigma Delta. Phi Sigma Delta's records note that there were sixteen active Phi Alpha chapters at the time of the merger. Both fraternities had chapters at three campuses, two of which were "readily resolved," and in the case of the third, this chapter was released to join another fraternity. At the time of the merger, Phi Alpha had initiated around 7,000 members.

Ten years later in 1969, Phi Sigma Delta merged with Zeta Beta Tau.

== Symbols ==
The fraternity's badge was a gold rectangular plaque, wider than it was tall, and superimposed with the raised letters ΦΑ and surrounded with a row of pearls. Its pledge button was circular, containing a blue circle within a red circle. Phi Alpha's colors were maroon and blue. Its flower was the rose.

Its magazine, the Phi Alpha Quarterly began publication in 1917. Its member-only, "esoteric" publication was the Phi Alpha Bulletin.

== Chapters ==
This is the list of the 35 chapters of Phi Alpha fraternity.

Chapter	Charter date and range	Institution	Location	Status	Ref.
Alpha	October 14, 1914 – April 6, 1959	George Washington University	Washington, D.C.	Merged (ΦΣΔ)	(Note: Became the Phi Alpha chapter of Phi Sigma Delta with the national merger of the two fraternities.)
Beta	February 22, 1916 – April 6, 1959	University of Maryland, Baltimore	Baltimore, Maryland	Merged (ΦΣΔ)	(Note: Became the Phi Beta chapter of Phi Sigma Delta with the national merger of the two fraternities.)
Gamma	December 26, 1916 – 1947	Georgetown University	Washington, D.C.	Inactive	
Delta	February 15, 1918 – 1924	Northwestern University	Evanston, Illinois	Inactive	
Epsilon	April 2, 1919 – April 6, 1959	University of Maryland, College Park	College Park, Maryland	Merged (ΦΣΔ)	(Note: Became the Phi Epsilon chapter of Phi Sigma Delta with the national merger of the two fraternities.)
Zeta	December 7, 1919 – 1925	Yale University	New Haven, Connecticut	Inactive	
Eta	December 30, 1919 – 1938; 1955 – 1959	Johns Hopkins University	Baltimore, Maryland	Withdrew	(Note: Became a chapter of Tau Epsilon Phi.)
Theta	1920 – April 6, 1959	New York University	New York City, New York	Merged (ΦΣΔ)	(Note: Merged with an existing Phi Sigma Delta chapter with the national merger of the two fraternities.)
Iota	February 20, 1920 – 1925	Columbia University	New York City, New York	Inactive	
Kappa	March 3, 1921 – 1939; 1952 – April 6, 1959	University of Pennsylvania	Philadelphia, Pennsylvania	Merged (ΦΣΔ)	(Note: Merged with the Zeta chapter of Phi Sigma Delta with the national merger of the two fraternities.)
Lambda	February 19, 1921 – 1927	DePaul University	Chicago, Illinois	Inactive	
Mu	April 16, 1922 – 1947	University of Virginia	Charlottesville, Virginia	Merged (ΦΣΔ)	
Nu	March 16, 1924 – 1940; 19xx ? – April 6, 1959	Clark University	Worcester, Massachusetts	Merged (ΦΣΔ)	(Note: Became the Phi Nu chapter of Phi Sigma Delta with the national merger of the two fraternities.)
Xi				Unassigned	
Omicron	1924 – April 6, 1959	University of New Hampshire	Durham, New Hampshire	Merged (ΦΣΔ)	(Note: Chapter formed from Tau Gamma Phi, established in 1922. It became the Phi Omicron chapter of Phi Sigma Delta with the national merger of the two fraternities.)
Pi	December 14, 1924 – April 6, 1959	Boston University	Boston, Massachusetts	Merged (ΦΣΔ)	(Note: Became the Phi Pi chapter of Phi Sigma Delta with the national merger of the two fraternities.)
Rho	February 6, 1925 – April 6, 1959	University of Richmond	Richmond, Virginia	Merged (ΦΣΔ)	(Note: Chapter formed from Tri Phi, established in 1916. It became the Phi Rho chapter of Phi Sigma Delta with the national merger of the two fraternities.)
Sigma	October 25, 1925 – 1933; 1938 – April 6, 1959	Brooklyn Polytechnic Institute	Brooklyn, New York	Merged (ΦΣΔ)	(Note: Chapter formed from Tau Kappa Rho, established in 1917. It became the Phi Sigma chapter of Phi Sigma Delta with the national merger of the two fraternities.)
Tau	March 31, 1927 – 1953	College of William & Mary	Williamsburg, Virginia	Inactive	(Note: Chapter formed from Zeta Theta Pi, established in 1924.)
Upsilon	April 24, 1927 – 1940	University of Chicago	Chicago, Illinois	Inactive	
Phi	March 19, 1927 – April 6, 1959	Duquesne University	Pittsburgh, Pennsylvania	Merged (ΦΣΔ)	(Note: Chapter formed from Phi Delta Rho, established in 1927. Its became the Phi Phi chapter of Phi Sigma Delta with the national merger of the two fraternities.)
Chi	October 15, 1927 – 1959	Duke University	Durham, North Carolina	Inactive	(Note: Chapter formed from Alpha Pi Delta, established in 1922.)
Psi	February 20, 1928 – 1930	University of Tennessee at Chattanooga	Chattanooga, Tennessee	Inactive	(Note: Chapter formed from Delta Beta Gamma, established in 1923.)
Omega	May 11, 1928 – 1943	University of North Carolina at Chapel Hill	Chapel Hill, North Carolina	Inactive	
Alpha Alpha	December 1, 1928 – 1935	West Virginia University	Morgantown, West Virginia	Inactive	
Alpha Beta	May 4, 1929 – April 6, 1959	Temple University	Philadelphia, Pennsylvania	Merged (ΦΣΔ)	(Note: Chapter formed from Koffee Klub, established in 1927. It became the Phi Alpha Beta chapter of Phi Sigma Delta with the national merger of the two fraternities.)
Alpha Gamma	December 7, 1930 – 1958	Wayne State University	Detroit, Michigan	Inactive	(Note: Chapter formed from Epsilon Tau, established in 1927.)
Alpha Delta	December 7, 1930–1941	University of Detroit Mercy	Detroit, Michigan	Inactive	(Note: Chapter formed from Epsilon Tau, established in 1923.)
Alpha Epsilon	1937–1942	St. John's College	Annapolis, Maryland	Inactive	(Note: Chapter formed from the Key Society, established in 1932.)
Alpha Zeta	1938–1941	St. John's University	New York City, New York	Inactive	(Note: Chapter formed from Phi Iota Lambda.)
Alpha Eta	1940 – April 6, 1959	City College of New York	New York City, New York	Merged (ΦΣΔ)	(Note: Became the Phi Alpha Eta chapter of Phi Sigma Delta with the national merger of the two fraternities.)
Alpha Theta	1941–1947	Washington College	Chestertown, Maryland	Inactive	
Alpha Iota	1953 – April 6, 1959	Cornell University	Ithaca, New York	Merged (ΦΣΔ)	(Note: Merged with the Beta chapter of Phi Sigma Delta with the national merger of the two fraternities.)
Alpha Kappa	1957 – April 6, 1959	Bronx Branch of Hunter College	The Bronx, New York City, New York	Merged (ΦΣΔ)	(Note: Became the Phi Alpha Kappa chapter of Phi Sigma Delta with the national merger of the two fraternities.)
Alpha Lambda	1958 – April 6, 1959	City College of New York Uptown	Manhattan, New York	Merged (ΦΣΔ)	(Note: Became the Phi Allpha Mu chapter of Phi Sigma Delta chapter with the national merger of the two fraternities.)
Alpha Mu	1958 – April 6, 1959	Pratt Institute	Brooklyn, New York	Merged (ΦΣΔ)	(Note: Merged with the Alpha Omicron chapter of Phi Sigma Delta with the national merger of the two fraternities.)

== See also ==
- List of Jewish fraternities and sororities
