= William Newcorn =

American politician

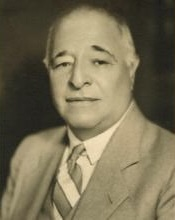

Member of the New Jersey General Assembly from Union County
- In office 1902–1904

First Assistant Attorney General of New Jersey
- In office 1919–1924

Judge of the Plainfield District Court
- In office 1906–1912
- Appointed by: Edward C. Stokes

Personal details
- Born: March 4, 1868 Kraków, Kingdom of Galicia and Lodomeria, Austria-Hungary
- Died: November 10, 1946 (aged 78) Plainfield, New Jersey, U.S.
- Party: Republican
- Spouses: Rachel Drear (m. 1889–1896); Mamie Miller (m. 1904)
- Children: 3
- Parents: Nathan Newcorn; Cecelia Friedner
- Occupation: Lawyer; politician; judge

William Newcorn (March 4, 1868 – November 10, 1946) was a Polish-born Jewish-American lawyer, politician, and judge from New Jersey. He was a member of the New Jersey General Assembly.

== Early life ==
Newcorn was born on March 4, 1868, in Kraków, Austria, the son of Nathan Newcorn and Cecelia Friedner.

Newcorn moved to America with his parents in 1870 and settled in New York City. He graduated from Grammar School No. 4 in 1880 and passed entrance exams for admission to the City College of New York, although he ended up not attending college. In 1883, he began working for the Knickerbocker Ice Company of New York. He worked there until 1887, when he began working as a wholesale cigar and tobacco dealer. In 1889, he moved to Plainfield, New Jersey, and ran a sporting goods and musical instrument store until 1897. He studied law while working there.

== Career ==
In 1897, he was admitted to the bar and began working as a lawyer in Plainfield. Newcorn was elected Justice of the Peace in 1893, resigning from that office in 1897. He was a member of the Union County Republican Committee and a member, secretary, and treasurer of the City Republican Committee. In 1901, he was elected to the New Jersey General Assembly as a Republican, serving as one of the three representatives of Union County. He served from 1902 to 1903, having been re-elected to the office in 1902. In 1906, Governor Edward C. Stokes appointed him Judge of the District Court. He was reappointed Judge in 1907 and served as Judge until 1912.

Newcorn resigned from the Union County Republican Committee when he became judge, but in 1914 he rejoined the Committee and served as its chairman until 1917. During World War I, he was a member of the City Liberty Loan Committee and an organizer and trustee of the Plainfield Community Chest. In 1919, he was appointed First Assistant Attorney General of New Jersey. He served in that position until 1924. He then worked as a special counsel to the state's legal department from 1924 to 1927. He was corporation counsel of Plainfield from 1933 to 1941. He was also a Supreme Court Commissioner and Special Master in Chancery.

Newcorn was a director of the State Trust Co., Palm Oil Co., Processing Co., Inc., Panama Palm Oil Co., Inc., Columbia Palm Oil Co., and the Plainfield Title and Mortgage Co. He became president of the Plainfield Board of Trade in 1931. He was a member of the American Bar Association, the New Jersey State Bar Association, the Union County Bar Association, and the Plainfield Bar Association.

== Personal life ==
In 1889, he married Rachel Drear. Their children were Netta and Isabel. In 1904, he married a second time Mamie Miller. Their children were Cecil and Jerome David.

A member of the Improved Order of Red Men, Newcorn was elected Great Sachem of the Great Reservation of New York in 1900 and was a representative to the Great Council of the United States. He was a master workman and financier of the local Ancient Order of United Workmen lodge and a counsel commander of the Woodmen of the World. He was a member of the Improved Order of Heptasophs, the Elks, the Knights of Pythias, the New Jersey Historical Society, the National Geographic Society, the Freemasons, He was also honorary Grand Superior of legal fraternities Phi Epsilon Pi and Lambda Alpha Phi.

He was president of the YMHA from 1924 to 1925, president of the board of trustees of the Jewish Community Center, first chairman of the New Jersey section of the Zionist Organization of America, president of the United Hebrew Charities Organization in 1914, and an elected member of the American Jewish Committee. He was involved with the Joint Distribution Committee and the Anti-Defamation League. He was also an organizer of Temple Sholom of Plainfield, serving as its president from 1913 to 1928.

Newcorn died in Muhlenberg Hospital, where he went for an operation for gland trouble several days beforehand, on November 10, 1946. Around 450 people attended his funeral in Temple Sholom, the first time the temple was used for a funeral. Judge Donald H. McLean and former New Jersey State Senator Arthur N. Pierson were honorary pallbearers. He was buried in Mount Lebanon Cemetery in Iselin.
