= Tau Phi Sigma =

American multicultural collegiate fraternity

- ΤΦΣ
- Founded: November 11, 1992; 33 years ago University of Illinois at Urbana–Champaign
- Type: Social
- Former affiliation: NIC
- Status: Active
- Emphasis: Multicultural
- Scope: Regional
- Motto: Como Humanos Siempre Unidos, Como Hermanos Jamas Vencidos "As Humans Always United, As Brothers Never Defeated"
- Pillars: Equality, Respect, Unity, Loyalty, and Pride
- Colors: Navy Blue Silver
- Flower: Don Juan Rose
- Mascot: Gryphon
- Publication: Gryphon Gazette
- Philanthropy: Fight 4 Life Initiative
- Chapters: 6
- Nickname: Tau Phi’s and G-Men
- Headquarters: Chicago, Illinois; United States

Tau Phi Sigma (ΤΦΣ) is a multicultural service-oriented college fraternity, founded in 1992 at the campus of the University of Illinois at Urbana-Champaign.

== History ==
Tau Phi Sigma is a multicultural college fraternity, founded on November 11, 1992, at the campus of the University of Illinois at Urbana-Champaign.

It was established by thirteen students attending the university who were unable to find a fraternity that satisfied their ideals of brotherhood. They intended to create a brotherhood that would encompass all ethnicities and backgrounds and make men of good character, which would manifest itself in attaining a higher education, providing service to the community, and promoting social and cultural awareness.

The founding fathers were:

- Arturo Alvarez
- Jose Juan Alvarez
- Ceasar Arenas
- Francisco Avila
- Jorge Covarrubias
- Jose Luis Del Real
- Mario Del Real
- Guadalupe Odilon Diaz
- Juan Leonardo Muñoz
- Juan Pablo Diaz
- Salvador Jaime Garcia
- Carlos Haro
- Vernan Paul Ituralde
- Efrain Lazaro
- Elmer Martinez
- Javier Alberto Ordaz

On May 1, 1993, the first seventeen members of a fraternity they named Sigma Tau Phi emerged.

Another national fraternity had used the same name as early as 1918. As that group had merged into another NIC fraternity and was still known by them as a predecessor group, the new multicultural group at Illinois opted early to change its name from Sigma Tau Phi to Tau Phi Sigma to avoid any confusion. (Note: This was Sigma Tau Phi, which merged its seven chapters into Alpha Epsilon Pi in 1947. Similar situations arose with many fraternities over the years, as popular combinations of letters were tried, and often adjusted.)

Since then, the fraternity has expanded to eight collegiate chapters and two alumni chapters in the Midwest. Its first alumni chapter, the Illinois Alumni chapter, was established on March 1, 2009. Its national headquarters are in Chicago, Illinois.

== Symbols ==
The fraternity's motto is Como Humanos Siempre Unidos, Como Hermanos Jamas Vencidos or "As Humans Always United, As Brothers Never Defeated". Its principles or pillars are Equality, Respect, Unity, Loyalty, and Pride.

The fraternity's colors are navy blue and silver. Its mascot is the griffin. Its flower is the Don Juan rose. Its nicknames are Tau Phi’s and G-Men.

== Philanthropy ==
Tau Phi Sigma is a service-oriented fraternity. To further research and development of major diseases such as cancer, diabetes, epilepsy and cardiologic conditions Tau Phi Sigma established the Fight 4 Life Initiative as its national philanthropy to support the following organizations: American Cancer Society, American Diabetes Association, American Epilepsy Society, and the American Heart Association,

== Chapters ==
In the following list, active chapters are indicated in bold and inactive chapters are in italics.

Chapter	Charter date and range	Institutions	Location	Status	Ref.
Alpha	November 11, 1992 – 2020	University of Illinois at Urbana-Champaign	Champaign and Urbana, Illinois	Inactive	
**Beta**	February 17, 1996	University of Illinois at Chicago, Dominican University	Chicago, Illinois	Active	
**Gamma**	July 26, 1997	Purdue University	West Lafayette, Indiana	Active	
**Delta**	September 12, 1997	DePaul University	Chicago, Illinois	Active	
Epsilon	February 14, 1998	Northern Illinois University	Dekalb, Illinois	Inactive	
**Eta**	June 13, 2009	Purdue University Northwest	Hammond, Indiana	Active	
Zeta colony		Indianapolis Citywide	Indianapolis, Indiana	Inactive	(Note: Colony was established on January 31st, 2009. However, it went inactive before being chartered.)
**Theta colony**		Chicago State University	Chicago, Illinois	Active	(Note: Colony was established on August 28, 2009.)
**Omega**				Memorial	

== See also ==
- List of social fraternities
- Cultural interest fraternities and sororities
