= Sigma Lambda Pi =

Defunct American collegiate Jewish fraternity

- ΣΛΠ
- Founded: April 1915; 111 years ago New York University
- Type: Social
- Affiliation: Independent
- Status: Merged
- Merge date: 1932
- Successor: Phi Epsilon Pi
- Emphasis: Jewish
- Scope: National (US)
- Motto: Dum Vivimus Fratres Vivamus "While we live, let us live as brothers"
- Colors: Sapphire blue and Gold
- Flower: carnation
- Jewel: Sapphire
- Chapters: 13
- Headquarters: United States

Sigma Lambda Pi (ΣΛΠ) was an officially non-sectarian and historically Jewish fraternity founded in 1915 at New York University. It ceased operations in 1932 as chapters either closed, became locals or merged with Phi Epsilon Pi.

== History ==
Sigma Lambda Pi was established in April 1915 at New York. Its founders were Herbert J. Roeder, Mathew W. Sherman, Abraham Weinberg, and Milton R. Weinberger. It was a Jewish emphasis fraternity but was incorporated in New York as a non-sectarian organization.

In 1932 the fraternity disintegrated. The chapters at Boston, Muhlenberg, and Ohio State joined Phi Epsilon Pi. The Baird's archive explains that at the time, these were the last three active chapters. The Columbia chapter dissolved The branch at Rider College became a local, being allowed to retain the name Sigma Lambda Pi. Later, the Rider chapter granted a charter to the Bryant and Stratton Commercial College in Providence, Rhode Island.

== Symbols ==
The badge of Sigma Lambda Pi was in the shape of an arch with a crown surmounting it. The arch had seven pearls, the crown ten pearls, and there was a sapphire at the top. The badge's exposed gold was nugget finished, and the letters were gold on a background of gold. The fraternity's colors were sapphire blue and gold. Its motto was Dum Vivimus Fratres Vivamus whose English translation is "While we live, let us live as brothers". Its flower was the Carnation.

== Chapters ==
Following is a list of the chapters of Sigma Lambda Pi. Inactive chapters and institutions are in italics.

Chapter	Charter date and range	Institution	Location	Status	Ref.
Alpha	1915–1922	New York University	New York City, New York	Inactive	
Delta	1920–1923	New York College of Dental and Oral Surgery	New York City, New York	Consolidated	(Note: Merged with Kappa chapter when the two colleges merged in 1923.)
Phi	1920–1932	Fordham University	New York City, New York	Inactive	
Kappa	1920–1932	Columbia University	New York City, New York	Disbanded	
Theta	1921–1925	West Virginia University	Morgantown, West Virginia	Inactive	
Beta	1922–1932	University of Pennsylvania	Philadelphia, Pennsylvania	Inactive	
Mu	1923–1925	University of Michigan	Ann Arbor, Michigan	Inactive	
Rho	1923–1930	Western Reserve University	Cleveland, Ohio	Inactive	
Zeta	1924–1932	Boston University	Boston, Massachusetts	Merged (ΦΕΠ)	(Note: Chapter merged with Phi Epsilon Pi.)
Gamma	1925–1932	Muhlenberg College	Allentown, Pennsylvania	Merged (ΦΕΠ)	
Omicron	1927–1932	Ohio State University	Columbus, Ohio	Merged (ΦΕΠ)	(Note: This chapter had its origin in the Rho Club (local), which had formed in 1926.)
Tau	1930–1957	Rider University	Lawrenceville, New Jersey	Merged (ΖΒΤ)	(Note: Chapter was formed from Sigma Phi Beta (local). This chapter reverted to local status when the fraternity dissoleve and became Zeta Beta Tau in 1957.)
	1935–1967	Bryant and Stratton Commercial College	Smithfield, Rhode Island	Merged (ΤΕΦ)	(Note: This chapter switched to local status under the name Sigma Lambda Pi, and later became a chapter of Tau Epsilon Phi. ΤΕΦ's chapter list notes its Sigma Lambda chapter at Bryant College (predecessor school name) chartered in 1967, thus the local lasted for several decades.)

== See also ==
- List of Jewish fraternities and sororities
