= Phi Epsilon Pi =

North American Jewish collegiate fraternity (1904–1970)

- ΦΕΠ
- Founded: November 23, 1904; 121 years ago City College of New York
- Type: Social
- Former affiliation: NIC
- Status: Merged
- Merge date: November 1970
- Successor: Zeta Beta Tau
- Scope: International
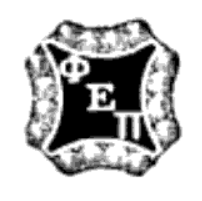
- Member badge
- Colors: Purple and Gold
- Publication: Phi Epsilon Pi Quarterly
- Chapters: 79
- Members: 26,811 (1967) active
- Headquarters: Philadelphia, Pennsylvania; United States

Phi Epsilon Pi (ΦΕΠ) fraternity, active between 1904 and 1970 and now dormant, with a predominantly Jewish membership, was founded in New York City and eventually opened at least 48 chapters on college campuses across the United States and one in Canada. After several mergers, it consolidated into Zeta Beta Tau in November 1970.

== History ==
=== Founding ===
Phi Epsilon Pi (PEP) fraternity was established on November 23, 1904, at the City College of New York (CCNY). Phi Epsilon Pi was incorporated in New York State on February 9, 1914, and became a member of the National Interfraternity Conference in 1921. The fraternity was founded on non-sectarian principles, but throughout the organization’s history, the membership was largely Jewish. Its Founders were Alvin P. Bloch, Arthur Hamburger, William A. Hannig, Siegfried F. Hartman, Arthur Hirschberg, Abraham E. Horn, and Max Shlivek.

The fraternity’s first chapters were founded at CCNY (Alpha, 1904), Columbia University (Beta, 1905), and Cornell University (Epsilon, 1911).

=== Expansion ===
By 1913, the fraternity started to expand outside of New York State. Much of this next wave of expansion came through the absorption of local fraternities; many of these were older than the national fraternity itself. For example, Mu chapter at the University of Georgia (1915) came from the E.D.S Society, founded in 1895, which had been the oldest Jewish local fraternity in continuous existence.

In 1930 Phi Epsilon Pi absorbed the Syracuse University chapter of Omicron Alpha Tau, a smaller Jewish fraternity that would disperse by 1934. This chapter, formed in 1920 either merged with the existing and older Phi Epsilon Pi chapter on the campus or re-established it. Four of ΟΑΤ's other chapters merged into Tau Delta Phi.

By 1933, Phi Epsilon Pi’s total membership stood at 3,600. During World War II, approximately 2,000 fraternity members served in the military, and most chapters closed. After the war, many chapters were reactivated, and new chapters opened as well, including one at McGill University in Canada, making Phi Epsilon Pi an international fraternity. In 1954, the membership of the fraternity reached 11,132.

Phi Epsilon Pi was the first fraternity to appropriate funds for activities outside of its organization, with the creation of an endowment of $10,000 in 1925 to fund scholarships at the National Agricultural College in Doylestown, Pennsylvania. The interest from this fund paid the annual expenses for young men interested in agriculture. The Phi Epsilon Pi Foundation was created in 1945.

=== Mergers ===
In 1932, three of the five existing chapters of Sigma Lambda Pi merged into Phi Epsilon Pi. These became the Alpha Nu chapter at Muhlenberg, the Alpha Omicron chapter at Ohio State, and the Alpha Xi chapter at Boston University. Meanwhile, Sigma Lambda Pi's Columbia chapter dissolved, and its Rider College chapter continued as a local.

Kappa Nu merged into Phi Epsilon Pi on October 14, 1961. In this second national merger, Kappa Nu brought seventeen chapters into the combined fraternity, while Phi Epsilon Pi added 38 chapters. The fraternity kept the Phi Epsilon Pi name through both of these mergers. In 1962, the fraternity had 48 active chapters, 14 inactive chapters, and 22,350 members.

In March 1970, in a third national merger, Phi Epsilon Pi was absorbed by the Zeta Beta Tau fraternity.

== Symbols ==
Phi Epsilon Pi's badge was a concave rectangle with couped ends, domed and with the three Greek letters ΦΕΠ and shown bendwise (angled to the lower right) in gold against a black background. The base was jeweled with sixteen pearls, four on each side around the perimeter.

The pledge pin was an elongated concave rectangle with its corners also couped with a gold beveled border. Its center was filled with purple enamel, with the symbols of a ducal coronet, a scimitar piercing it in a bendwise direction, and curved toward an open eye in the base.

The fraternity's colors were purple and gold. Its publication was the Phi Epsilon Pi Quarterly, founded in 1915.

The coat of arms is described as follows:

Arms: Argent, on a fess purpure (purple) a rising sun resplendent or (gold). In the middle chief, a Phoenician galley under sail and power on a conventionalized ocean all proper, guided by a mullet on the second in dexter, and in base, a scimitar piercing the field palewise emerging in the center of a single loop of rope knotted with ends couped at top, all proper. Crest: a sword fesswise surmounted by a ducal coronet all proper under three mullets or. Below is a motto in Greek.

== Governance ==
Phi Epsilon Pi was originally governed by a national council that included five officers and a representative from each chapter. As the fraternity added chapters, in 1921 it changed to a grand council, consisting of seven officers who were elected at an annual national convention. Its headquarters were in Philadelphia, Pennsylvania.

== Notable members ==
- William J. Brodsky (Syracuse University), director of the Securities Investor Protection Corporation, executive chairman of the Chicago Board Options Exchange, and chairman of the World Federation of Exchanges
- Carl Etelman (Tufts), college and professional football player
- Seymour Greenberg (Northwestern) amateur tennis player; winner of the U.S. Men's Clay Court Championships in 1942 and 1943
- Abraham Lavender (University of South Carolina) professor of sociology at Florida International University, St. Mary's College of Maryland, and the University of Miami
- Sam Massell (University of Georgia), 53rd mayor of Atlanta, Georgia
- William Newcorn (City College of New York), New Jersey General Assembly and district court judge
- Abdul Aziz Said (American University), Professor Emeritus of International Relations in the School of International Service at American University
- Dan Stoneking (Northwestern University), sports editor of the Minneapolis Star and president of the Professional Hockey Writers' Association
- Red Weiner (Muhlenberg College), professional football and baseball player

== See also ==
- List of Jewish fraternities and sororities
