= Alpha Gamma Sigma (fraternity) =

American collegiate agricultural group

- ΑΓΣ
- Founded: January 28, 1923; 103 years ago University of Missouri
- Type: Professional
- Affiliation: NIC
- Status: Active
- Emphasis: Agricultural
- Scope: National
- Motto: "Preparing Men for Life by Coming together as Scholars, Living as Brothers, and Becoming Leaders of Tomorrow"
- Colors: Royal Blue and Silver
- Symbol: Plow
- Flag
- Flower: American Red Rose
- Publication: The Rake
- Chapters: 6
- Members: 4300+ lifetime
- Nickname: AgSig, AGS
- Headquarters: Columbus, Ohio; United States
- Website: www.agsig.net

Alpha Gamma Sigma (ΑΓΣ; commonly known as AgSig or AGS) is American collegiate social and professional agricultural fraternity. It was established in 1923 at the University of Missouri and has since chartered eight other chapters. The fraternity is a member of the North American Interfraternity Conference.

== History ==
Alpha Gamma Sigma began as a local agricultural fraternity at University of Missouri, on January 28, 1923. A similar organization called the National Agriculture Club formed at Ohio State University on October 23, 1922; its name was changed to Tau Gamma Phi fraternity during its first year.

The two organizations met in Columbia, Missouri in March 1931 to develop a plan for merging. The meeting resulted in the establishment of a new national agricultural fraternity, Alpha Gamma Sigma. The meeting's participants also created a new constitution, a National Chapter, and its officers, including Clair E. Jones, president; Wayne Johnson, vice president; Don Rush, treasurer, O. E. Allen, secretary; and Delmer Glenn, historian. With the merger, Tau Gamma Phi became the Alpha chapter and Alpha Gamma Sigma became the Beta chapter.

On November 28 and 29, 1931, the fraternity held its second general convention in Columbus, Ohio. There, the fraternity adopted a revised constitution and by-laws, a member's badge and pledge pin, a crest, colors, a flower, a motto, and a ritual. It also appointed a committee to work on the fraternity's songs.

At the November 1951 convention, the fraternity approved expansion to other campuses. A delegation from Beta chapter met with interested students at the University of Nebraska on March 14, 1953. This meeting resulted in the Gamma chapter which was chartered on November 7, 1953. This was followed by the founding of Delta chapter at Tennessee Tech in 1961, the Epsilon chapter at Missouri State University on February 16, 1970, and Zeta chapter at Western Illinois University on April 3, 1971.

Alpha Gamma Sigma joined the National Interfraternity Conference on June 19, 1971. Alpha Gamma Sigma absorbed the local IlliDell Cooperative Fraternity at the University of Illinois as the IlliDell chapter in January 1981; the new chapter's name broke with the fraternity's Greek letter nomenclature to honor the predecessor's history. The Iota chapter at Arkansas Tech University received its charter on November 20, 1999.

As of 2023, Alpha Gamma Sigma has six active chapters and 4,350 initiates. Its headquarters are located in Columbus, Ohio.

== Symbols ==
The fraternity's original motto was "Cultivate that ye may reap" and its publication was The Rake. Its current motto is "Preparing Men for Life by Coming together as Scholars, Living as Brothers, Becoming Leaders of Tomorrow". The fraternities colors are royal blue and silver. Its flower is the American red rose and its symbol is the plow.

The mission statement of Alpha Gamma Sigma is "Preparing men for life by coming together as scholars, living as brothers, becoming leaders of tomorrow."

== Chapter houses ==
The Beta chapter leased its first chapter house in the fall of 1923.

In 1953, the newly established Gamma chapter rented a house at 3256 Holdrege Street in Lincoln, Nebraska; this was the first chapter house in the fraternity's history. The chapter resided there until it purchased the former FarmHouse chapter house at 4013 Holdrege Street in 1953. In 1971, the chapter built a new house at 4001 Holdrege Street, moving into this apartment-style dwelling in 1972.

Beta chapter completed the construction of its new house at the University of Missouri in 2016.

== Chapters ==
Following is a list of the chapters of Alpha Gamma Sigma. Active chapters are indicated in bold. Inactive chapters are in italics.

Chapter	Charter date and range	Institution	Location	Status	Ref.
**Alpha**	October 23, 1922	Ohio State University	Columbus, Ohio	Active	(Note: Chapter formed from Tau Gamma Phi (local), established as the National Agricultural Club on October 23, 1922. It changed its name during the first year of its existence.)
**Beta**	January 28, 1923	University of Missouri	Columbia, Missouri	Active	(Note: Chapter formed from Alpha Gamma Sigma (local), established in 1923.)
**Gamma**	November 7, 1953	University of Nebraska	Lincoln, Nebraska	Active	(Note: Chapter formed from Alpha Gamma Club (local), established in 1953.)
**Delta**	May 29, 1961 – 1973; 19xx ?	Tennessee Technological University	Cookeville, Tennessee	Active	
Epsilon	February 16, 1970 – 2019	Missouri State University	Springfield, Missouri	Inactive	
**Zeta**	April 3, 1971	Western Illinois University	Macomb, Illinois	Active	
Eta	1975–199x ?	Cornell University	Ithca, New York	Inactive	
**IlliDell**	January 24, 1981	University of Illinois Urbana-Champaign	Champaign, Illinois	Active	(Note: Chapter was formed from the IlliDell Cooperative Fraternity, established in 1949. It was named in part for Warren Goodell, a faculty member who donated $3,000 of the $5,000 needed for the down payment on the fraternity's first house.)
Iota	November 20, 1999 – 201x ?	Arkansas Tech University	Russellville, Arkansas	Inactive	

== See also ==
- Professional fraternities and sororities
