= Zeta Beta Tau =

American fraternal organization

- ΖΒΤ
- Founded: December 29, 1898; 127 years ago City College of New York
- Type: Social
- Affiliation: NIC
- Status: Active
- Emphasis: Jewish
- Scope: International
- Motto: "A Powerhouse of Excellence"
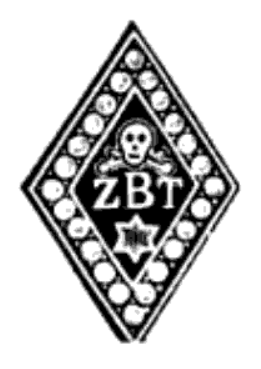
- Member badge
- Colors: Medium Blue, White, and Gold
- Symbol: Skull
- Flag
- Flower: Gold carnation
- Publication: The Digital Deltan
- Chapters: 82 active
- Members: 140,000+ lifetime active
- Nickname: ZBT
- Headquarters: 1320 City Center Drive; Suite 225; Carmel, Indiana 46032; United States
- Website: zbt.org

Zeta Beta Tau (ΖΒΤ) is a Greek-letter social fraternity based in North America. It was founded in 1898 at City College of New York. Originally a Zionist youth society, its purpose changed in 1954 when the fraternity became non-sectarian and open to non-Jewish members. It is recognized as the first Jewish fraternity.

== History ==
=== Founding ===
The Zeta Beta Tau fraternity was led until his death by Richard J. H. Gottheil, a professor of languages at Columbia University and a Zionist. On December 29, 1898, he formed a Zionist youth society with a group of students from several New York City universities. Fifteen young men — among them Herman Abramowitz, Aaron Levy, Bernhard Bloch, David Liknaitz, Isidore Delson, Louis S. Posner, Aaron Drucker, Bernhard Saxe, Bernard Ehrenreich, Herman Sheffield, Menachem Eichler, David Swick, Aaron Eiseman, Maurice Zellermayer, and David Levine — gathered at the Jewish Theological Seminary on that date to found the organization.

The society was called Z.B.T., which referred to the first letters in the transliteration of the Hebrew phrase צִיּוֹן בְּמִשְׁפָּט תִּפָּדֶה "Zion Be-mishpat Tipadeh", which translated means "Zion shall be redeemed with justice". This is taken from Isaiah 1:27 — "Zion be-mishpat tipadeh ve-shaveha be-tzedakah" (Zion shall be redeemed with judgment, and they that return of her, with righteousness"). The word "judgment" is sometimes translated as "justice". The meaning of Z.B.T. was listed in the American Jewish Committee's annual report as early as 1900–1901.

In 1903, Z.B.T. formally became Zeta Beta Tau, and its purpose shifted away from that of a Zionist youth organization as other Zionist organizations grew in prominence. The original Hebrew meaning of Z.B.T. is not esoteric. The meaning is reported in the official written history of Zeta Beta Tau, Here's to Our Fraternity: One Hundred Years of Zeta Beta Tau, 1898–1998, by Marianne Rachel Sanua.

Zeta Beta Tau had 14 chapters by 1909 and established a chapter in Montreal in 1913. In the same year, Zeta Beta Tau was first represented at the National Inter-fraternity Conference.

=== Mergers ===
The Zeta Beta Tau has merged with four other national Jewish fraternities: Phi Alpha, Kappa Nu, Phi Sigma Delta and Phi Epsilon Pi, with chapters and colonies at over 90 campus locations. In 1959, Phi Alpha merged into Phi Sigma Delta and in 1961 Kappa Nu merged into Phi Epsilon Pi. In 1969–70, Phi Sigma Delta and Phi Epsilon Pi merged into Zeta Beta Tau. Zeta Beta Tau's official name is "A Brotherhood of Kappa Nu, Phi Alpha, Phi Epsilon Pi, Phi Sigma Delta, and Zeta Beta Tau".

=== Pledging abolished ===
Zeta Beta Tau abolished the institution of pledging in 1989 as a way to combat and eliminate hazing and replaced the pledging process with one in which new members are accepted as brothers upon receiving a bid to the fraternity. Zeta Beta Tau's decision to do away with pledging did not involve an associate membership process, however. Once a brother joins the fraternity he will receive all rights and responsibilities as the rest of the chapter and shall be eligible for any position within the chapter regardless of how long he has been a brother. This decision was made in response to the Age of Liability, in which extensive research on hazing shed light on how the culture of subservient pledging led to several deaths nationwide.

== Symbols ==
Zeta Beta Tau's motto is "A Powerhouse of Excellence". The fraternity's symbol is a skull. Its colors are medium blue, white, and gold. Its flowers is the gold carnation. Its publication is The Digital Deltan. Its nickname is ZBT.

== Philanthropies ==
Children's Miracle Network Hospitals (CMNH), which raises funds for children's hospitals in North America, was chosen as an official philanthropy of the fraternity during a Supreme Council meeting in the summer 2002. Chapters host Get on the Ball events in which people donate to CMNH to sign a large inflatable beach ball.

Jewish Women International has been the third official philanthropic partner of ZBT, since 2015. JWI provides chapters with prevention programming to create stronger and safer Greek communities. JWI works with students to create sexual assault and dating violence prevention programming so that they understand how to ask for consent, so that every bystander knows to intervene, so that if a friend discloses after an assault students know how to respond, how to identify an abusive relationship, and build a culture of respect. ZBT chapters raise funds for JWI's National Library Initiative, which creates libraries in domestic violence shelters nationwide - transforming basic spaces into comforting havens stocked with colorful furniture, toys, computers, and dozens of brand-new books.

Gift of Life Marrow Registry has been an official partner of ZBT since 2017. The B+ Foundation has been an official partner of ZBT since 2025.

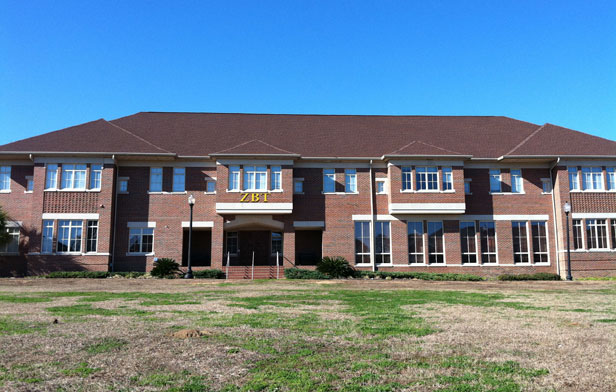
Zeta Beta Tau's old chapter house at Florida State University

== Chapters ==
Zeta Beta Tau has 82 chapters and colonies in the United States and Canada. The state with the most chapters is New York. The oldest active chapter is Gamma at New York University. In 2022, the largest ΖΒΤ chapter was Lambda at The University of Texas at Austin.

== Local chapter or member misconduct ==
In 1974, the Zeta Beta Tau chapter at Monmouth University, then known as Monmouth College, was suspended by the national headquarters after the death of a student during a pledge hazing ritual.

In 1988, the ZBT chapter at the University of Wisconsin-Madison held a mock slave auction featuring blackface and racial slurs. New pledges were dressed in wigs and "sold" for their services. This incident resulted in widespread campus protests against the fraternity, which was accused of creating a hostile environment for minorities.

In February 1988, the Judicial Inquiry Office of the University of Pennsylvania charged the Zeta Beta Tau fraternity with violating seven Pennsylvania statutes and University of Pennsylvania guidelines including sexual and racial harassment during a fraternity rush event on October 1, 1987. The fraternity was accused of hiring two African American women to perform before an audience of 100 to 200 men during the rush event. While the two women were undressing, the crowd yelled "Where did you get them niggers?" and other racist remarks.

In June 1996, three members of the University of California, Los Angeles chapter of Zeta Beta Tau were arrested and charged with raping a female student at a fraternity-sponsored weekend event in Palm Springs. The Riverside County District Attorney's Office dropped the rape charges several weeks later. According to the Daily Bruin, the university's student newspaper, the prosecutor indicated the woman requested that the charges be dropped because she wanted her identity to remain confidential.

In February 2018, the Cornell University chapter of Zeta Beta Tau was placed on probation for two years following an investigation into multiple reports of "pig roasts" in which men competed to try to sleep with and humiliate women they considered to be overweight.

In August 2018, the national fraternity and the chapter at the University of California, Los Angeles, were sued for negligence, assault, battery, and intentional infliction of emotional distress. The lawsuit also encompassed the Sigma Alpha Epsilon fraternity as well as UCLA.

In September 2018, Syracuse University's student newspaper published a video showing Zeta Beta Tau members forcibly spitting into pledges' mouths and covering their faces with a wet mop.

In September 2023, the chapter at Purdue University filed a lawsuit against Purdue University after the university placed them under a cease and desist order for allegedly violating university policies. The chapter argued the university did not have adequate proof of any wrongdoings and violated its due process rights.

In 2025, the New York University chapter of Zeta Beta Tau was placed on interim suspension pending an investigation by the Office of Student Conduct. According to the university, the chapter was suspended while allegations of misconduct were being investigated.

=== Warrior Beach Retreat controversy ===
While in Panama City Beach, Florida, on April 17, 2015, for a spring formal, members of the fraternity's University of Florida chapter were accused of abusing disabled military veterans during a Warrior Beach Retreat. According to the retreat's founder, Linda Cope, the students were antagonizing veterans. She stated that some of the men made inappropriate comments to the spouses of veterans. One veteran said that he and his service dog were spat on and that beer was poured on them from the 20th floor. However, the manager of the resort later stated under oath that some veterans complained after a bottle was popped open on a balcony and some champagne spilled onto people below, and that the fraternity brothers involved apologized profusely. One student told investigators that "the cork popped and some champagne may have fallen over."

The University of Florida placed the ZBT chapter on interim suspension and charged the organization with a series of offenses as part of its formal investigation into the allegations of the event in Panama City Beach. Laurence Bolotin, the executive director of Zeta Beta Tau International, issued a statement on the organization's web site that noted, in part, "On behalf of our entire organization, I want to apologize to veterans, both those who were in Panama City Beach and those who have felt the pain from afar, as well as to their families..." The president of the University of Florida, W. Kent Fuchs, called the actions of the fraternity members unacceptable and committed to a full investigation. Cope stated that she also received an apology letter from the president of ZBT's chapter at the University of Florida.

No criminal charges were filed and a University of Florida investigation resulted in the fraternity being charged with causing potential harm to others, obscenity, and public intoxication. One of the students present said they were not even aware that there was a Wounded Warrior's beach retreat. The university said that the immediate suspension of the chapter was primarily for safety reasons because of the high number of death threats made to the chapter and its members after news of the incident surfaced. Zeta Beta Tau at the University of Florida has since been re-formed.

== See also ==
- List of social fraternities
- List of Jewish fraternities and sororities
