= List of Arnold Air Society chapters =

The Arnold Air Society is an honorary organization for officer candidates in the Air Force Reserve Officer Training Corps (AFROTC) and at the United States Air Force Academy (USAFA). In the following list of chapters, active chapters are indicated in bold and inactive chapters are in italics.

Chapter	Charter date	Institution	Location	Status	Ref.
Air University Squadron		Alabama State University	Montgomery, Alabama	Inactive	
		Allegheny College	Meadville, Pennsylvania	Inactive	
**Robert G. Carr Squadron**		Angelo State University	San Angelo, Texas	Active	
**Tex May Squadron**		Arizona State University	Tempe, Arizona	Active	
**John Boots Stratford Squadron**		Auburn University	Auburn, Alabama	Active	
		Ball State University	Muncie, Indiana	Inactive	
**Colonel James Connally Squadron**		Baylor University	Waco, Texas	Active	
**Captain Lance P. Sijan Squadron**		Boston University	Boston, Massachusetts	Active	
**Colonel Mario A. Garuti Squadron**		Bowling Green State University	Bowling Green, Ohio	Active	
		Bradley University	Peoria, Illinois	Inactive	
**Bernard F. Fisher Squadron**		Brigham Young University	Provo, Utah	Active	
		Brooklyn College	New York City, New York	Inactive	
		Brown University	Providence, Rhode Island	Inactive	
		Butler University	Indianapolis, Indiana	Inactive	
**Robin Olds Squadron**		California State University, Fresno	Fresno, California	Active	
		California State University, Sacramento	Sacramento, California	Active	
**Brigadier General Robinson Risner Squadron**		California State University, San Bernardino	San Bernardino, California	Active	
		Case Western Reserve University	Cleveland, Ohio	Inactive	
		Catholic University of America	Washington, D.C.	Inactive	
**Patrick Welch Squadron**		Central Washington University	Ellensburg, Washington	Active	
		Charleston Southern University	North Charleston, South Carolina	Active	
		The Citadel	Charleston, South Carolina	Inactive	
**General Elwood R. Quesada Squadron**		Clarkson University	Potsdam, New York	Active	
**Major Rudolf Anderson Jr. Squadron**		Clemson University	Clemson, South Carolina	Active	
		Colby College	Waterville, Maine	Inactive	
**Captain Mark Giles Danielson Squadron**		Colorado State University	Fort Collins, Colorado	Active	
		Cornell University	Ithaca, New York	Inactive	
		DePauw University	Greencastle, Indiana	Inactive	
		Drake University	Des Moines, Iowa	Inactive	
**Kevin J. McManus Squadron**		Duke University	Durham, North Carolina	Active	
		Duquesne University	Pittsburgh, Pennsylvania	Inactive	
**Kitty Hawk Squadron**		East Carolina University	Greenville, North Carolina	Active	
**Daniel P. Woodward Squadron**		Embry–Riddle Aeronautical University, Daytona Beach	Daytona Beach, Florida	Active	
**Steven M. Scherp Squadron**		Embry–Riddle Aeronautical University, Prescott	Prescott, Arizona	Active	
		Emory University	Atlanta, Georgia	Inactive	
**Major Robert H. Lawrence Jr. Squadron**		Fayetteville State University	Fayetteville, North Carolina	Active	
**Paul T. Suttle Squadron**		Florida State University	Tallahassee, Florida	Active	
		Fordham University	New York City, New York	Inactive	
		Franklin & Marshall College	Lancaster, Pennsylvania	Inactive	
		George Washington University	Washington, D.C.	Inactive	
		Georgetown University	Washington, D.C.	Inactive	
**Cornell C. Houston Squadron**		Georgia Tech	Atlanta, Georgia	Active	
		Gettysburg College	Gettysburg, Pennsylvania	Inactive	
		Grove City College	Grove City, Pennsylvania	Inactive	
		Hobart College	Geneva, New York	Inactive	
**Andrew D Turner Squadron**		Howard University	Washington, D.C.	Active	
**Lt. Colonel Francis Richard Scobee Squadron**		Illinois Institute of Technology	Chicago, Illinois	Active	
**Tammy L. Blubaugh Squadron**		Indiana State University	Terre Haute, Indiana	Active	
**Lt. James L Correll Squadron**		Indiana University Bloomington	Bloomington, Indiana	Active	
**O'Neil Squadron**		Iowa State University	Ames, Iowa	Active	
**Herbert Carter Squadron**		Jackson State University	Jackson, Mississippi	Active	
**Lt. Loyd B. Vorhies Squadron**		Kansas State University	Manhattan, Kansas	Active	
**2nd Lt. Kevin G. Bryan Squadron**		Kent State University	Kent, Ohio	Active	
		Kenyon College	Gambier, Ohio	Inactive	
		Lawrence University	Appleton, Wisconsin	Inactive	
Major Ralph Cheli		Lehigh University	Bethlehem, Pennsylvania	Inactive	
**Captain Frank S. Hagan Squadron**		Louisiana State University	Baton Rouge, Louisiana	Active	
General Emmett O'Donnell Squadron		Louisiana Tech University	Ruston, Louisiana	Inactive	
		Loyola Marymount University	Los Angeles, California	Inactive	
**Major William V. Holohan Squadron**		Manhattan College	Bronx, New York City, New York	Active	
**Colonel Charles Scharf Squadron**		Marquette University	Milwaukee, Wisconsin	Active	
Lt. Colonel Jay Zeamer Squadron		Massachusetts Institute of Technology	Cambridge, Massachusetts	Inactive	
**Robert James Meder Squadron**		Miami University	Oxford, Ohio	Active	
**Lt. Philip L. Bek Squadron**		Michigan State University	East Lansing, Michigan	Active	
**Robert E. LaMotte Squadron**		Michigan Technological University	Houghton, Michigan	Active	
**Kenneth J. Snedden Squadron**		Mississippi State University	Mississippi State, Mississippi	Active	
Eugene G. DeCosse Squadron		Montana State University	Bozeman, Montana	Inactive	
**Lt. Colonel Ralph S. Van Brunt Squadron**		New Jersey Institute of Technology	Newark, New Jersey	Active	
**David W. Wallace Squadron**		New Mexico State University	Las Cruces, New Mexico	Active	
		New York University-University Heights	New York City, New York	Inactive	
		New York University Washington Square	New York City, New York	Inactive	
**Lt. Colonel Elmore M. Kennedy Jr. Squadron**		North Carolina A&T State University	Greensboro, North Carolina	Active	
**George V. Holloman Squadron**		North Carolina State University	Raleigh, North Carolina	Active	
		North Dakota State University	Fargo, North Dakota	Inactive	
**David L. Bullit Curtis Robinson Squadron**		Northern Arizona University	Flagstaff, Arizona	Active	
		Norwich University	Northfield, Vermont	Active	
		Occidental College	Los Angeles, California	Inactive	
**General Curtis E. LeMay Squadron**		Ohio State University	Columbus, Ohio	Active	
**John P. Robbins Squadron**		Ohio University	Athens, Ohio	Active	
		Ohio Wesleyan University	Delaware, Ohio	Inactive	
**Thunderbird Squadron**		Oklahoma State University–Stillwater	Stillwater, Oklahoma	Active	
**1st Lt. James L. Badley Squadron**		Oregon State University	Corvallis, Oregon	Active	
		Parks College	Cahokia, Illinois	Inactive	
**Harry R. Armstrong Squadron**		Pennsylvania State University	State College, Pennsylvania	Active	
		Princeton University	Princeton, New Jersey	Inactiv	
**Iven C. Kincheloe Jr. Squadron**		Purdue University	West Lafayette, Indiana	Active	
**Jack Newkirk Squadron**		Rensselaer Polytechnic Institute	Troy, New York	Active	
**Colonel Andrew J. Dougherty Squadron**	1986	Rochester Institute of Technology	Rochester, New York	Active	
**Captain Wilbur S. Darby Squadron**		Rutgers University–Camden	Camden, New Jersey	Active	
**Independence Hall Squadron**		Saint Joseph's University	Merion Station, Pennsylvania	Active	
**Colonel Charles A. Lindbergh Squadron**		Saint Louis University	St. Louis, Missouri	Active	
		Saint Michael's College	Colchester, Vermont	Inactive	
		St. Olaf College	Northfield, Minnesota	Inactive	
**Colonel James B. Irwin Squadron**		Samford University	Homewood, Alabama	Active	
**John Burdette Binkley Squadron**		San Diego State University	San Diego, California	Active	
		San Francisco State University	San Francisco, California	Inactive	
		San José State University	San Jose, California	Active	
		Sewanee: The University of the South	Sewanee, Tennessee	Inactive	
**Bernie V. Guthrie Squadron**		South Dakota State University	Brookings, South Dakota	Active	
**Lt. General Robert W. Harper Squadron**	1954	Southern Illinois University Carbondale	Carbondale, Illinois	Active	
		Southern Methodist University	Dallas, Texas	Inactive	
		Stanford University	Stanford, California	Inactive	
		Stevens Institute of Technology	Hoboken, New Jersey	Inactive	
**Robert P. Halloran Squadron**		Syracuse University	Syracuse, New York	Active	
		Tulane University	New Orleans, Louisiana	Inactive	
Colonel Vance H. Marchbanks Squadron		Tennessee State University	Nashville, Tennessee	Inactive	
**Major Horace Carswell Squadron**		Texas A&M University	College Station, Texas	Active	
**General Samuel E. Anderson Squadron**		Texas Christian University	Fort Worth, Texas	Active	
**President Lyndon B. Johnson Squadron**		Texas State University	San Marcos, Texas	Active	
**Spencer B. LaBrie Squadron**		Texas Tech University	Lubbock, Texas	Active	
**T. C. Marrs Squadron**		Troy University	Troy, Alabama	Active	
		Tufts University	Medford, Massachusetts	Inactive	
Alvin Callender Squadron		Tulane University	New Orleans, Louisiana	Inactive	
Colonel George S. Roberts Squadron		Tuskegee University	Tuskegee, Alabama	Inactive	
		Union College	Schenectady, New York	Inactive	
**Falcon Squadron**		United States Air Force Academy	El Paso County, Colorado	Active	
		University of Akron	Akron, Ohio	Inactive	
**Thomas H. Borders Squadron**		University of Alabama	Tuscaloosa, Alabama	Active	
**Russell Spicer Squadron**		University of Arizona	Tucson, Arizona	Active	
Winston P. Wilson Squadron		University of Arkansas	Fayetteville, Arkansas	Inactive	
		University of Buffalo	Buffalo, New York	Inactive	
**General James H. Doolittle Squadron**		University of California, Berkeley	Berkeley, California	Active	
**Captain Don Brown Squadron**		University of California, Los Angeles	Los Angeles, California	Activehttps://en.wikipedia.org/w/index.php?title=List_of_Arnold_Air_Society_chapters&action=edit	
**General Robert M. White Squadron**		University of Central Florida	Orlando, Florida	Active	
**Hap Arnold Squadron**	May 1947	University of Cincinnati	Cincinnati, Ohio	Active	
**Lt. Colonel Ellison S. Onizuka Squadron**		University of Colorado Boulder	Boulder, Colorado	Active	
**Brundage Squadron**		University of Connecticut	Storrs, Connecticut	Active	
**Major General T. Alan Bennett Squadron**		University of Delaware	Newark, Delaware	Active	
		University of Detroit Mercy	Detroit, Michigan	Inactive	
		University of Evansville	Evansville, Indiana	Inactive	
**Captain Dale E. Mabry Squadron**		University of Florida	Gainesville, Florida	Active	
**Leon F. Ellis Squadron**		University of Georgia	Athens, Georgia	Active	
**Lt. Colonel Horace M. Hickam Squadron**		University of Hawaiʻi at Mānoa	Honolulu, Hawaii	Active	
**Ray Losano Squadron**		University of Houston	Houston, Texas	Active	
**Jake Schaefer Squadron**		University of Illinois at Urbana-Champaign	Champaign, Illinois	Active	
		University of Iowa	Iowa City, Iowa	Inactive	
**General Ennis C. Whitehead Squadron**		University of Kansas	Lawrence, Kansas	Active	
**General Russell E. Dougherty Squadron**		University of Kentucky	Lexington, Kentucky	Active	
		University of Louisiana at Lafayette	Lafayette, Louisiana	Inactive	
**Tommy Mantell Squadron**		University of Louisville	Louisville, Kentucky	Active	
**Frank P. Lahm Squadron**		University of Maryland, College Park	College Park, Maryland	Active	
		University of Maryland Eastern Shore	Princess Anne, Maryland	Inactive	
**Allan B. Bunce Squadron**		University of Massachusetts Amherst	Amherst, Massachusetts	Active	
**Captain John A. Ognowski Squadron**		University of Massachusetts Lowell	Lowell, Massachusetts	Active	
Brigadier General Everett R. Cook Squadron		University of Memphis	Memphis, Tennessee	Inactive	
**Lt. Richard H.Shaddick Squadron**	1951	University of Miami	Coral Gables, Florida	Active	
**James Van Veen Squadron**		University of Michigan	Ann Arbor, Michigan	Active	
**General Lauris Norstad Squadron**		University of Minnesota	Minneapolis, Minnesota	Active	
**Harold High Squadron**		University of Minnesota Duluth	Duluth, Minnesota	Active	
**Al Key Squadron**		University of Mississippi	Mississippi State, Mississippi	Active	
**Colonel James P. Fleming Squadron**		University of Missouri	Columbia, Missouri	Active	
**Joyce-Johnson Squadron**		University of Nebraska–Lincoln	Lincoln, Nebraska	Active	
**Earl S. Hoag Squadron**		University of Nebraska Omaha	Omaha, Nebraska	Active	
**General Wilbur Creech Squadron**		University of Nevada, Las Vegas	Las Vegas, Nevada	Active	
**Harl Pease Jr. Squadron**		University of New Hampshire	Durham, New Hampshire	Active	
		University of New Mexico	Albuquerque, New Mexico	Inactive	
**Jesse J. Moorhead Squadron**		University of North Carolina at Chapel Hill	Chapel Hill, North Carolina	Active	
**Neil A. Armstrong Squadron**		University of North Carolina at Charlotte	Charlotte, North Carolina	Active	
**Major Thomas J. Clifford Squadron**		University of North Dakota	Grand Forks, North Dakota	Active	
**Royal N. Baker Squadron**		University of North Texas	Denton, Texas	Active	
**Benjamin D. Foulois Squadron**		University of Notre Dame	Notre Dame, Indiana	Active	
**Walter R. "Waddy" Young Squadron**		University of Oklahoma	Norman, Oklahoma	Active	
		University of Oregon	Eugene, Oregon	Inactive	
**Salzarulo Squadron**		University of Pittsburgh	Pittsburgh, Pennsylvania	Active	
**Richard J. Mallon Squadron**		University of Portland	Portland, Oregon	Active	
**Apollo Squadron**		University of Puerto Rico at Mayagüez	Mayagüez, Puerto Rico	Active	
**Eagle Squadron**		University of Puerto Rico, Río Piedras Campus	San Juan, Puerto Rico	Active	
		University of Puget Sound	Tacoma, Washington	Inactive	
**Richard E. Fleming Squadron**		University of St. Thomas	Saint Paul, Minnesota	Active	
**General Jimmie Adams Squadron**		University of South Alabama	Mobile, Alabama	Active	
**William G. Farrow Squadron**		University of South Carolina	Columbia, South Carolina	Active	
**General James V. Hartinger Squadron**		University of South Florida	Tampa, Florida	Active	
		University of Southern California	Los Angeles, California	Inactive	
George Robert Hall Squadron		University of Southern Mississippi	Hattiesburg, Mississippi	Inactive	
Lieutenant General Frank M. Andrews Squadron		University of Tennessee	Knoxville, Tennessee	Active	
John H. Payne Squadron		University of Texas at Austin	Austin, Texas	Active	
General John D. Ryan Squadron		University of Texas at San Antonio	San Antonio, Texas	Active	
		University of Tulsa	Tulsa, Oklahoma	Inactive	
**General Bernard A. Schriever Squadron**		University of Utah	Salt Lake City, Utah	Active	
**Demas T. Craw Squadron**		University of Virginia	Charlottesville, Virginia	Active	
**Douglas Matheson Squadron**		University of Washington	Seattle, Washington	Active	
**Richard I. Bong Squadron**		University of Wisconsin–Madison	Madison, Wisconsin	Active	
		University of Wisconsin–Superior	Superior, Wisconsin	Inactive	
**General Samuel C. Phillips Squadron**		University of Wyoming	Laramie, Wyoming	Active	
General John K. Cannon Squadron		Utah State University	Logan, Utah	Inactive	
		Valdosta State University	Valdosta, Georgia	Active	
**Thomas C. Richards Squadron**		Virginia Tech	Blacksburg, Virginia	Active	
		Washburn University	Topeka, Kansas	Inactive	
**Colonel Galileo Bossio Squadron**		Washington State University	Pullman, Washington	Active	
		Washington University in St. Louis	St. Louis, Missouri	Inactive	
**Charles E. Yeager Squadron**		West Virginia University	Morgantown, West Virginia	Active	
		Wichita State University	Wichita, Kansas	Inactive	
**Brigadier General James Stewart Squadron**		Wilkes University	Wilkes-Barre, Pennsylvania	Active	
		Willamette University	Salem, Oregon	Inactive	
**Colonel James T. Murray Squadron**		Worcester Polytechnic Institute	Worcester, Massachusetts	Active	
**Wilbur & Orville Wright Squadron**		Wright State University	Fairborn, Ohio	Active	
**Patrick Tillman Squadron**		Yale University	New Haven, Connecticut	Active	

== See also ==
- List of Silver Wings chapters
