= List of Delta Phi Epsilon (social) chapters =

These are the past and present chapters of Delta Phi Epsilon social sorority. Active chapters are indicated in bold. Inactive chapters and institutions are in italics.

Chapter	Charter date and range	Institution	Location	Status	Ref.
**Alpha**	March 17, 1917 – 1966; 1983	New York University	New York City, New York	Active	(Note: After going dormant, the chapter reformed from Alpha Delta Psi (local), established in 1976.)
Beta	1917–1919	Teachers College, NY	New York City, New York	Inactive	
**Gamma**	1921–1923; 1949–199x ?; 2014	Syracuse University	Syracuse, New York	Active	(Note: After going dormant, the chapter was reformed in 1949 by absorbing Delta Theta Gamma (local), established in 1948. It reformed as a colony in 2013.)
Delta	1923–1969, 1971–1983, 19xx ?–1998	Hunter College	New York City, New York	Inactive	
Epsilon	1922–1972	McGill University	Montreal, Quebec, Canada	Inactive	
Zeta	1925–1958	University of Toronto	Toronto, Ontario, Canada	Inactive	
**Eta**	1925–1944; 1966	University of Pittsburgh	Pittsburgh, Pennsylvania	Active	(Note: Chapter formed from Kappa Upsilon Mu (local), established in 1923. After going dormant, it reformed in 1966.)
Iota	1925–1950, 1969–1971	Florida State University	Tallahassee, Florida	Inactive	(Note: Chapter formed from Delta Phi, established in 1925. After going dormant, it reformed as a colony in 1968.)
Theta	1926–1957	University of Denver	Denver, Colorado	Inactive	(Note: Chapter formed from Phi Alpha Tau, established in 1925.)
Kappa	1926–1955	University of Manitoba	Winnipeg, Manitoba, Canada	Inactive	
**Lambda**	1926–1937; 1958–1971; 2011	Adelphi University	Garden City, New York	Active	
Mu	1926–1951	University of Cincinnati	Cincinnati, Ohio	Inactive	(Note: Chapter formed from Delta Phi Epsilon (local), established in 1925.)
Nu	1926–1969	University of Pennsylvania	Philadelphia, Pennsylvania	Inactive	
Xi	1926–1930	Brenau College	Gainesville, Georgia	Inactive	
Omicron	1927–1932, 1945–1952	University of Louisville	Louisville, Kentucky	Inactive	(Note: Chapter formed from Delta Tau (local), established in 1925. After going dormant, it reformed from Phi Sigma Tau, established in 1942.)
Pi	1927–1932, 1953–1973	University of Alabama	Tuscaloosa, Alabama	Inactive	(Note: Chapter formed from Pi Rho Sigma (loca), established in 1924. After going dormant, it reformed as a colony in 1952.)
Rho	1927–1933, 1945–1971, 1977–1988	University of Illinois	Urbana, Illinois	Inactive	(Note: Chapter formed from Sigma Alpha Lambda (local), established in 1924. After going dormant, it reformed as a colony in 1944 and 1977.)
Sigma	1928–1930, 1945–2002	Ohio State University	Columbus, Ohio	Inactive	(Note: Chapter formed from Omicron Tau (local), established in 1927.)
Tau	1929–1932	University of Minnesota	Minneapolis, Minnesota	Inactive	
Upsilon	1930–1934, 1962–1972	Long Island University	New York, New York	Inactive	(Note: Chapter formed from Phi Alpha Pi (local), established in the 1920s.)
Phi	1931–1984	CUNY, Brooklyn College	Brooklyn, New York City, New York	Inactive	
Chi	1934–1990	University of Texas	Austin, Texas	Inactive	
**Psi**	1935–2007; 2015	University of Georgia	Athens, Georgia	Active	(Note: Chapter formed from Alpha Sigma Phi (local), established in 1927. After going dormant, it reformed as a colony in 2015.)
**Omega**	1939–1980; 1987	University of Miami	Coral Gables, Florida	Active	(Note: Chapter formed from Zeta Iota Pi (local), established in 1938. After going dormant, it reformed from Alpha Alpha Sigma, established in 1984.)
Delta Alpha	1940–1954	University of Vermont	Burlington, Vermont	Inactive	(Note: Chapter formed from K.E.L. Society, established in 1926.)
Delta Beta	1940–1947	University of Colorado	Boulder, Colorado	Inactive	
Delta Gamma	1946–1974, 1981–2004	University of British Columbia	Vancouver, British Columbia, Canada	Inactive	(Note: Chapter formed from Sigma Iota Pi (local), established in 1944.)
**Delta Delta**	1946–1952; 2014	Indiana University Bloomington	Bloomington, Indiana	Active	(Note: Chapter formed from Alpha Epsilon (local), established in 1944.)
**Delta Epsilon**	1947–1951; 2004	Drexel University	Philadelphia, Pennsylvania	Active	(Note: Chapter formed from Sigma Omicron Pi (local), established in 1941. After going dormant, it reformed as a colony in 2003.)
Delta Zeta	1948–1968	University of California, Berkeley	Berkeley, California	Inactive	(Note: Chapter formed from Delta Phi (local), established in 1946.)
**Delta Eta**	1954–1971; 1985	University of Michigan	Ann Arbor, Michigan	Active	(Note: Chapter formed from Adelphi (local), established in 1953. After going dormant, it reformed as a colony in 1984.)
Delta Theta	1955–1973	Wayne State University	Detroit, Michigan	Inactive	(Note: Chapter formed from Sigma Theta Delta (local), established in 1926.)
**Delta Iota**	1955–1973; 1990	Queens College, City University of New York	Queens, New York	Active	(Note: Chapter formed from Phi Tau Alpha (local), established in 1937.)
**Delta Kappa**	1955	University of Florida	Gainesville, Florida	Active	
Delta Lambda	1956–1973	University of California, Los Angeles	Los Angeles, California	Inactive	
Delta Mu	1960–1970	Georgia State University	Atlanta, Georgia	Inactive	(Note: Chapter formed from Delta Sigma (local), established in 1957.)
**Delta Nu**	1959–19??; 1984–1992; 2009	Temple University	Philadelphia, Pennsylvania	Active	(Note: Chapter formed from Phi Delta Tau (local), established in 1940. After going dormant, it reformed as a colony in 1983 and 2008.)
**Delta Xi**	1960	University of Maryland, College Park	College Park, Maryland	Active	
Delta Omicron	1960–1970	New York University-University Heights	Bronx, New York	Inactive	
**Delta Pi**	1960–1966; 2016	Pennsylvania State University	University Park, Pennsylvania	Active	(Note: Chapter formed from Chi Lambda (local), established in 1959.)
Delta Rho	1960–1988, 199x ?–2003	Cornell University	Ithaca, New York	Inactive	
**Delta Sigma**	1962	Rider University	Lawrence Township, New Jersey	Active	(Note: Chapter formed from Iota Sigma Pi (local), established in 1947.)
Delta Tau	1963–1971	Washington University in St. Louis	St. Louis, Missouri	Inactive	
**Delta Upsilon**	1965–1976; 2019	University of Tampa	Tampa, Florida	Active	(Note: Chapter formed from P.H.I. (local), established in 1963.)
Delta Phi	1966–1969	University of Oklahoma	Norman, Oklahoma	Inactive	
Delta Chi	1966–1971, 1987–1997	George Washington University	Washington, D.C.	Inactive	
Delta Psi	1968–1977	University of Hartford	West Hartford, Connecticut	Inactive	(Note: Chapter formed from Sigma Kappa Delta, established in 1954.)
**Delta Omega**	1967–19??; 1985	Monmouth University	West Long Branch, New Jersey	Active	(Note: Chapter formed from Chi Sigma Delta (local), established in 1961.)
Phi Alpha	1968–1972	City University of New York	New York City, New York	Inactive	
Phi Beta	1968–1970	CUNY, Baruch College	New York City, New York	Inactive	
**Phi Gamma**	1969–1974; 1989	Indiana University of Pennsylvania	Indiana, Pennsylvania	Active	
Phi Delta	1968–1970	Eastern Michigan University	Ypsilanti, Michigan	Inactive	
Phi Epsilon	1968–1972	Lehman College	Bronx, New York	Inactive	
Phi Zeta	1970–1973	University of North Texas	Denton, Texas	Inactive	(Note: Chapter formed from Phi Delta (local), established in 1968.)
**Phi Eta**	1969	Northeastern University	Boston, Massachusetts	Active	(Note: Chapter formed from Lambda Phi Delta (local), established in 1967.)
Phi Theta	1970–1973	Oglethorpe University	Brookhaven, Georgia	Inactive	(Note: Chapter formed from Phi Theta Epsilon (local), established in 1968.)
Phi Iota	1971–1982	Edinboro University	Edinboro, Pennsylvania	Inactive	(Note: Chapter formed from Phi Mu Phi (local), established in 1968.)
Phi Kappa	1975–1995	University of North Carolina at Chapel Hill	Chapel Hill, North Carolina	Inactive	
**Phi Lambda**	1977	Emory University	Atlanta, Georgia	Active	
Phi Mu	1977–1980, 1983–1986	Tulane University	New Orleans, Louisiana	Inactive	
Phi Nu	1978–1984	University of Missouri	Columbia, Missouri	Inactive	
Phi Xi	1978–1998	Illinois Institute of Technology	Chicago, Illinois	Inactive	
Phi Omicron	1980–1993	Worcester Polytechnic Institute	Worcester, Massachusetts	Inactive	(Note: Chapter formed from Zeta Psi Little Sisters.)
**Phi Pi**	1980	Widener University	Chester, Pennsylvania	Active	(Note: Chapter formed from Alpha Omega (local), established in 1973.)
Phi Rho	1981–1982	Bucknell University	Lewisburg, Pennsylvania	Inactive	(Note: Chapter formed from Delta Lambda Pi.)
Phi Sigma	1981–1997	Northern Illinois University	DeKalb, Illinois	Inactive	
**Phi Tau**	1984–2004; 2009	Rutgers University–Camden	Camden, New Jersey	Active	
**Phi Upsilon**	1982–xxxx ?; 2012	Robert Morris University	Moon Township, Pennsylvania	Active	
**Phi Phi**	1984–2004; 2016	Towson University	Towson, Maryland	Active	
**Phi Chi**	1983	University of Maryland, Baltimore County	Catonsville, Maryland	Active	(Note: Chapter formed from Lambda Gamma Sigma.)
**Phi Psi**	1984	Keene State College	Keene, New Hampshire	Active	
Phi Omega	1983–1987	University of Massachusetts Lowell	Lowell, Massachusetts	Inactive	(Note: Chapter formed from Alpha Omega (local), established in 1968.)
Epsilon Alpha	1983–1990	Dartmouth College	Hanover, New Hampshire	Inactive	
Epsilon Beta	1984–1988	East Stroudsburg University of Pennsylvania	East Stroudsburg, Pennsylvania	Inactive	
**Epsilon Gamma**	1985	Stevens Institute of Technology	Hoboken, New Jersey	Active	(Note: Chapter formed from Gamma Delta (local), established in 1982.)
**Epsilon Delta**	1985	Binghamton University	Binghamton, New York	Active	(Note: Chapter formed from Kappa Phi Delta (local), established in 1982. It also absorbed Sigma Beta Nu.)
**Epsilon Epsilon**	1985	State University of New York at Albany	Albany, New York	Active	
**Epsilon Zeta**	1986	La Salle University	Philadelphia, Pennsylvania	Active	(Note: Chapter formed from Alpha Chi Rho Little Sisters.)
**Epsilon Eta**	1986	State University of New York at Fredonia	Fredonia, New York	Active	
Epsilon Theta	1986–1992	Fairleigh Dickinson University, Rutherford	Rutherford, New Jersey	Inactive	(Note: The Rutherford Campus was sold to Felician College in 1997)
**Epsilon Iota**	1986	State University of New York at Geneseo	Geneseo, New York	Active	
**Epsilon Kappa**	1987	State University of New York at Cortland	Cortland, New York	Active	
**Epsilon Lambda**	1987	Michigan Technological University	Houghton, Michigan	Active	(Note: Chapter formed from Delta Psi Omega, established in 1985.)
**Epsilon Mu**	1987	State University of New York at Brockport	Brockport, New York.	Active	(Note: Chapter formed from Gamma Phi Sigma (local), established in 1985.)
Epsilon Nu	1987–2003	State University of New York at Oneonta	Oneonta, New York	Inactive	
**Epsilon Xi**	1987	State University of New York at Oswego	Oswego, New York	Active	
**Epsilon Omicron**	1987	Clarion University of Pennsylvania	Clarion, Pennsylvania.	Active	(Note: Chapter formed from Alpha Beta Tau, established in 1985.)
**Epsilon Pi**	1988	State University of New York at Plattsburgh	Plattsburgh, New York	Active	
**Epsilon Rho**	1987	Hofstra University	Hempstead, New York	Active	
Epsilon Sigma	1988–1997	Gallaudet University	Washington, D.C.	Inactive	(Note: Chapter formed from Chi Omega Psi (local), established in 1970.)
Epsilon Tau	1988–2013	Bentley University	Waltham, Massachusetts	Inactive	
**Epsilon Upsilon**	1988	California State Polytechnic University, Humboldt	Arcata, California	Active	(Note: Chapter formed from Zeta Chi Theta (local), established in 1987.)
**Epsilon Phi**	1989	Thomas Jefferson University	Philadelphia, Pennsylvania	Active	
**Epsilon Chi**	1989	William Paterson University	Wayne, New Jersey	Active	
Epsilon Psi	1989–200x ?	Millersville University of Pennsylvania	Millersville, Pennsylvania	Inactive	(Note: Chapter formed from Phi Lambda Sigma, established in 1965.)
Epsilon Omega	1989–1996	Barry University	Miami Shores, Florida	Inactive	
**Alpha Alpha**	1989	West Chester University	West Chester, Pennsylvania	Active	
Alpha Beta	1989–1991	Cooper Union	New York City, New York	Inactive	
**Alpha Delta**	1989	Seton Hall University	South Orange, New Jersey	Active	
**Alpha Epsilon**	1989	Kennesaw State University	Cobb County, Georgia	Active	(Note: Chapter formed from Zeta Chi Lambda (local), established in 1965.)
Alpha Zeta	1989–1999	Lake Superior State University	Sault Ste. Marie, Michigan	Inactive	(Note: Chapter formed from Alpha Kappa Chi, established 1978.)
**Alpha Eta**	1989	Montclair State University	Montclair, New Jersey,	Active	(Note: Chapter formed from Phi Chi Omega (local), established in 1986.)
**Alpha Theta**	1989–1991; 2015	Stockton University	Galloway Township, New Jersey	Active	
Alpha Iota	1989–1999	University of San Francisco	San Francisco, California	Inactive	(Note: Chapter formed from Alpha Delta Sigma (local), established in 1986.)
**Alpha Kappa**	1990	Fairleigh Dickinson University	Madison, New Jersey	Active	
**Alpha Lambda**	1989	York College of Pennsylvania	Spring Garden Township, Pennsylvania	Active	(Note: Chapter formed from Phi Sigma Chi, established in 1977.)
**Alpha Gamma**	1989	Florida International University	Miami, Florida	Active	
**Alpha Mu**	1990	University of Michigan–Dearborn	Dearborn, Michigan	Active	(Note: Chapter formed from Beta Chi (local), established in 1987.)
Alpha Nu	1990–2011	State University of New York at New Paltz	New Paltz, New York	Inactive	
Alpha Xi	1990–1994	Saint Thomas University	Miami Gardens, Florida	Inactive	
Alpha Omicron	1990–xxxx ?	Fairleigh Dickinson University, Teaneck Campus	Teaneck, New Jersey	Inactive	(Note: Chapter formed from Epsilon Chi, established in 1989.)
**Alpha Pi**	1990	Southern Connecticut State University	New Haven, Connecticut	Active	(Note: Chapter formed from Delta Chi established in 1962.)
**Alpha Rho**	1991	Pace University	Pleasantville, New York	Active	
**Alpha Sigma**	1991	Saint Francis University	Loretto, Pennsylvania	Active	(Note: Chapter formed from TKE Little Sisters (local).)
**Alpha Tau**	1991	Winona State University	Winona, Minnesota	Active	(Note: Chapter formed from Zeta Chi Theta (local).)
**Alpha Upsilon**	1991–2006; 2012	Johnson & Wales University	Providence, Rhode Island	Active	(Note: Chapter formed from Chi Lambda Sigma Sisters (local), established in 1989.)
**Alpha Psi**	1991	Lawrence Technological University	Southfield, Michigan	Active	(Note: Chapter formed from Zeta Phi (local), established in 1988.)
**Alpha Chi**	1991	Bloomsburg University of Pennsylvania	Bloomsburg, Pennsylvania	Active	(Note: Chapter formed from Alpha Delta Chi (local), established in 1989.)
**Alpha Phi**	1991	Ramapo College of New Jersey	Mahwah, New Jersey	Active	
Alpha Omega	1991–2013	LIU Post	Brookville, New York	Inactive	(Note: Chapter formed from Delta Chi Omega (local), established in 1983. After going dormant, it reformed from Chi Delta Chi (local), established in 2015.)
**Beta Alpha**	1991–2002; 2018	Embry–Riddle Aeronautical University	Prescott, Arizona	Active	
Beta Beta	1992–2022	University of the Sciences in Philadelphia	Philadelphia, Pennsylvania	Inactive	(Note: Chapter formed from Pi Lambda Phi Little Sisters (local), established in 1991. It went dormant when the college merged with Saint Joseph's University in June 2022.)
Beta Gamma	1992–1998	Minnesota State University, Mankato	Mankato, Minnesota	Inactive	
Beta Delta	1992–1998	PennWest California	California, Pennsylvania	Inactive	
Beta Epsilon	1992–1999	Massachusetts College of Liberal Arts	North Adams, Massachusetts	Inactive	(Note: Chapter formed from Sigma Gamma Phi (local), established in 1991. After losing its charter reformed Sigma Gamma Phi (local) in 2003.)
Beta Zeta	1992–2005	University of Michigan–Flint	Flint, Michigan	Inactive	(Note: Chapter formed from Alpha Xi Omega (local), established in 1990.)
**Beta Eta**	1992	New Jersey Institute of Technology	Newark, New Jersey	Active	(Note: Chapter formed from Sigma Delta Epsilon (local), established in 1989.)
**Beta Theta**	1992	Kean University	Union Township, New Jersey	Active	(Note: Chapter formed from Rho Sigma Chi (local), established in 1982. Adopted international title on December 6th, 1992.)
**Beta Iota**	1992	St. Cloud State University	St. Cloud, Minnesota	Active	(Note: Chapter formed from Psi Delta Phi (local), established in 1989.)
Beta Kappa	1992–1995	Penn State Erie, The Behrend College	Erie, Pennsylvania	Inactive	(Note: Chapter formed from Sigma Theta Chi (local), established in 1986.)
**Beta Lambda**	1993	University of Wisconsin–Stevens Point	Stevens Point, Wisconsin	Active	(Note: Chapter formed from Alpha Omega Rho, established 1988. After going dormant, it reformed from Delta Phi Sigma (local), established in 2001.)
**Beta Mu**	1993	Rowan University	Glassboro, New Jersey	Active	
Beta Nu	1993–2001, 2010–2022	Wesley College	Dover, Delaware	Inactive	
**Beta Xi**	1993	The College of New Jersey	Ewing Township, New Jersey	Active	
Beta Omicron	1993–2003	Emporia State University	Emporia, Kansas	Inactive	
**Beta Pi**	1994	Concordia University	Montreal, Quebec, Canada	Active	
**Beta Rho**	1994	University of Illinois Chicago	Chicago, Illinois	Active	(Note: Chapter formed from Sigma Phi Alpha (local), established in 1967.)
Beta Sigma	1994–2003	Ottawa University	Ottawa, Kansas	Inactive	(Note: Chapter formed from Delta Gamma Phi, established in 1991.)
**Beta Tau**	1994	Nova Southeastern University	Fort Lauderdale-Davie, Florida	Active	
**Beta Upsilon**	1995	Rochester Institute of Technology	Henrietta, New York	Active	(Note: Chapter formed from Royal Ladies (local), established in 1991.)
**Beta Phi**	1996	Central Michigan University	Mount Pleasant, Michigan	Active	(Note: Chapter formed from Delta Kappa Pi, established in 1990)
**Beta Chi**	1997	St. Norbert College	De Pere, Wisconsin	Active	(Note: Chapter formed from Delta Kappa Phi, established in 1994.)
**Beta Psi**	1997	Brandeis University	Waltham, Massachusetts	Active	
**Beta Omega**	1998	St. John's University	New York City, New York	Active	
**Gamma Alpha**	April 18, 1998	Southern Illinois University Edwardsville	Edwardsville, Illinois	Active	(Note: Chapter formed from Daughters of Emeralds (local).)
**Gamma Beta**	2002	Florida Atlantic University	Boca Raton, Florida	Active	
**Gamma Gamma**	2003	Schreiner University	Kerrville, Texas	Active	(Note: Chapter formed from Pi Kappa (local), established in 1987.)
**Gamma Delta**	2004	Texas A&M University–Kingsville	Kingsville, Texas	Active	
**Gamma Epsilon**	2007	University of New Haven	West Haven, Connecticut	Active	
**Gamma Zeta**	2009	Webster University	Webster Groves, Missouri	Active	
**Gamma Eta**	2010	University at Buffalo	Buffalo, New York	Active	(Note: Chapter formed from Delta Delta (local), established in 2004.)
Gamma Theta	2010–201x ?	University of Connecticut Stamford	Stamford, Connecticut	Inactive	(Note: Chapter formed from Kappa Phi Mu.)
**Gamma Iota**	2010	Bridgewater State University	Bridgewater, Massachusetts	Active	
**Gamma Kappa**	2011	Capital University	Bexley, Ohio	Active	
**Gamma Lambda**	2011	Caldwell University	Caldwell, New Jersey	Active	
**Gamma Mu**	2011	Ferrum College	Ferrum, Virginia	Active	(Note: Chapter formed from Zeta Theta Epsilon, established in 1996.)
**Gamma Nu**	2012	Shawnee State University	Portsmouth, Ohio	Active	(Note: Chapter formed from Omega Pi Mu (local).)
**Gamma Xi**	2012	Rhode Island College	Providence, Rhode Island	Active	(Note: Chapter formed from Sigma Iota Theta (local), established in 2006.)
Gamma Omicron	2012–2019	Georgia Southern University	Statesboro, Georgia	Inactive	
Gamma Pi	2012–2022	North Carolina Wesleyan University	Rocky Mount, North Carolina	Inactive	
**Gamma Rho**	2012	University of Maine	Orono, Maine	Active	
**Gamma Sigma**	2013	Tarleton State University	Stephenville, Texas	Active	
**Gamma Tau**	2013	University of Toledo	Toledo, Ohio	Active	(Note: Chapter formed from Chi Delta Pi (local), established in 2001.)
**Gamma Upsilon**	2014	Campbell University	Buies Creek, North Carolina.	Active	
**Gamma Phi**	2014	St. Joseph's University	Patchogue, New York	Active	(Note: Chapter formed from Alpha Theta Rho (local), established in 2006.)
**Gamma Chi**	2014	Southern Illinois University Carbondale	Carbondale, Illinois	Active	
**Gamma Psi**	2014	Johnson & Wales University, Charlotte campus	Charlotte, North Carolina	Active	
**Gamma Omega**	2015	University of North Georgia	Dahlonega, Georgia	Active	
**Zeta Alpha**	2015	Tennessee Tech	Cookeville, Tennessee	Active	
**Zeta Beta**	2015	Truman State University	Kirksville, Missouri	Active	
**Zeta Gamma**	2015	Kutztown University of Pennsylvania	Kutztown, Pennsylvania	Active	
**Zeta Delta**	2016	Massachusetts Institute of Technology	Cambridge, Massachusetts	Active	
**Zeta Epsilon**	2016	Carleton University	Ottawa, Ontario, Canada	Active	(Note: Chapter formed from Kappa Beta Delta (local), established in 2012)
**Zeta Zeta**	2016	Young Harris College	Young Harris, Georgia	Active	
**Zeta Eta**	2016	California State University, Los Angeles	Los Angeles, California	Active	
**Zeta Theta**	2017	University of Rhode Island	Kingston, Rhode Island	Active	
**Zeta Iota**	2017	Northern Arizona University	Flagstaff, Arizona	Active	
**Zeta Kappa**	2018	Union College	Schenectady, New York	Active	
**Zeta Lambda**	2019	Farmingdale State University	East Farmingdale, New York	Active	
Zeta Mu	2022–2023	Ontario Tech University	Oshawa, Ontario, Canada	Inactive	
**Zeta Nu**	2023	University of Pittsburgh at Johnstown	Johnstown, Pennsylvania	Active	
**Zeta Xi**	2024	Ursinus College	Collegeville, Pennsylvania	Active	
**Zeta Omicron**	2024	Reinhardt University	Waleska, Georgia	Active	
