= List of Silver Wings chapters =

Silver Wings is an American service organization for college students. Originally known as Angel Flight, it was established in 1951 at the University of Omaha as a women's auxiliary organization for the Arnold Air Society. In the following list of chapters, active chapters are indicated in bold and inactive chapters and institutions are in italics.

Chapter	Charter date	Institution	Location	Status	Ref.
		Allegheny College	Meadville, Pennsylvania	Inactive	
**Captain Carmen A. Lucci**		Arizona State University	Tempe, Arizona	Active	
**John "Boots" Stratford**		Auburn University	Auburn, Alabama	Active	
		Ball State University	Muncie, Indiana	Inactive	
		Baylor University	Waco, Texas	Active	
**Captain Lance P. Sijan**		Boston University	Boston, Massachusetts	Active	
		Bowling Green State University	Bowling Green, Ohio	Inactive	
		Bradley University	Peoria, Illinois	Inactive	
		Brigham Young University	Provo, Utah	Inactive	
		California State University, Fresno	Fresno, California	Inactive	
		Case Western Reserve University	Cleveland, Ohio	Inactive	
		Catholic University of America	Washington, D.C.	Inactive	
**William H. Pitsenbarger**		Clarkson University	Potsdam, New York	Active	
**Major Dennis H. Sattler**		Clemson University	Clemson, South Carolina	Active	
		Colorado State University	Fort Collins, Colorado	Active	
		Drake University	Des Moines, Iowa	Inactive	
		Duquesne University	Pittsburgh, Pennsylvania	Inactive	
		East Carolina University	Greenville, North Carolina	Inactive	
**Challenger**	1986	Embry–Riddle Aeronautical University, Daytona Beach	Daytona Beach, Florida	Active	
**Steven M. Scherp**		Embry–Riddle Aeronautical University, Prescott	Prescott, Arizona	Active	
		Florida State University	Tallahassee, Florida	Inactive	
		Fordham University	New York City, New York	Inactive	
		George Washington University	Washington, D.C.	Inactive	
		Howard University	Washington, D.C.	Active	
		Indiana University Bloomington	Bloomington, Indiana	Inactive	
		Kansas State University	Manhattan, Kansas	Inactive	
		Kent State University	Kent, Ohio	Inactive	
Captain Frank S. Hagan		Louisiana State University	Baton Rouge, Louisiana	Inactive	
General Emmett O'Donnell		Louisiana Tech University	Ruston, Louisiana	Inactive	
		Michigan State University	East Lansing, Michigan	Inactive	
**Dotsie Stewart**		Michigan Technological University	Houghton, Michigan	Active	
**Kenneth J. Snedden**		Mississippi State University	Mississippi State, Mississippi	Active	
Eugene DeCosse		Montana State University	Bozeman, Montana	Inactive	
		New Mexico State University	Las Cruces, New Mexico	Inactive	
		New York University	New York City, New York	Inactive	
		North Carolina A&T State University	Greensboro, North Carolina	Inactive	
**Martha Emily Metz**		North Carolina State University	Raleigh, North Carolina	Active	
		North Dakota State University	Fargo, North Dakota	Inactive	
**David Louis "Bullit" Curtis-Robinson**		Northern Arizona University	Flagstaff, Arizona	Active	
**Colonel Francis J. McGouldrick**		Ohio State University	Columbus, Ohio	Active	
		Ohio Wesleyan University	Delaware, Ohio	Inactive	
**Dee Finnegan**	August 2019	Oklahoma State University–Stillwater	Stillwater, Oklahoma	Active	
		Pembroke College in Brown University	Providence, Rhode Island	Inactive	
**Bluford**		Pennsylvania State University	State College, Pennsylvania	Active	
**Ivan C. Kincheloe**		Purdue University	West Lafayette, Indiana	Active	
		Rensselaer Polytechnic Institute	Troy, New York	Active	
**Andrew J Dougherty**		Rochester Institute of Technology	Rochester, New York	Active	
Colonel James B. Irwin		Samford University	Homewood, Alabama	Inactive	
**John Burdette Binkley**		San Diego State University	San Diego, California	Active	
		San Francisco State University	San Francisco, California	Inactive	
		South Dakota State University	Brookings, South Dakota	Inactive	
		Southern Illinois University Carbondale	Carbondale, Illinois	Inactive	
		Syracuse University	Syracuse, New York	Inactive	
		Tennessee State University	Nashville, Tennessee	Inactive	
		Texas A&M University	College Station, Texas	Inactive	
		Texas Christian University	Fort Worth, Texas	Inactive	
		Texas State University	San Marcos, Texas	Inactive	
		Texas Tech University	Lubbock, Texas	Active	
Colonel George S. Roberts		Tuskegee University	Tuskegee, Alabama	Inactive	
Thomas H. Borders		University of Alabama	Tuscaloosa, Alabama	Inactive	
		University of Arizona	Tucson, Arizona	Inactive	
William P. Bowden		University of Arkansas	Fayetteville, Arkansas	Inactive	
		University at Buffalo	Buffalo, New York	Inactive	
		University of California, Los Angeles	Los Angeles, California	Inactive	
**Robert M. White**	October 2019	University of Central Florida	Orlando, Florida	Active	
**John P. Hyde**		University of Cincinnati	Cincinnati, Ohio	Active	
**Bernadette M. Jarvis**		University of Colorado Boulder	Boulder, Colorado	Active	
		University of Detroit Mercy	Detroit, Michigan	Inactive	
		University of Evansville	Evansville, Indiana	Inactive	
**Colonel L. G. Duggarr**		University of Georgia	Athens, Georgia	Active	
**Hickam**		University of Hawaiʻi	Honolulu, Hawaii	Active	
**Steven R. Nagel**		University of Illinois at Urbana-Champaign	Champaign, Illinois	Active	
		University of Kansas	Lawrence, Kansas	Inactive	
**General Jack I. Gregory**		University of Kentucky	Lexington, Kentucky	Active	
		University of Louisville	Louisville, Kentucky	Inactive	
		University of Maryland, College Park	College Park, Maryland	Active	
		University of Maryland Eastern Shore	Princess Anne, Maryland	Inactive	
		University of Memphis	Memphis, Tennessee	Inactive	
		University of Miami	Coral Gables, Florida	Inactive	
		University of Minnesota	Minneapolis, Minnesota	Inactive	
Al Key		University of Mississippi	Mississippi State, Mississippi	Inactive	
		University of Missouri	Columbia, Missouri	Inactive	
	1951	University of Nebraska Omaha	Omaha, Nebraska	Inactive	
**General Wilbur Creech**		University of Nevada, Las Vegas	Paradise, Nevada	Active	
		University of New Hampshire	Durham, New Hampshire	Inactive	
		University of New Mexico	Albuquerque, New Mexico	Inactive	
		University of North Carolina at Chapel Hill	Chapel Hill, North Carolina	Inactive	
		University of North Texas	Denton, Texas	Inactive	
**Joseph Stanley Smith**	2019	University of Notre Dame	Notre Dame, Indiana	Active	
**Walter R. "Waddy" Young**		University of Oklahoma	Norman, Oklahoma	Active	
		University of Oregon	Eugene, Oregon	Inactive	
		University of Pittsburgh	Pittsburgh, Pennsylvania	Inactive	
**General Jimmie V. Adams**		University of South Alabama	Mobile, Alabama	Active	
		University of South Carolina	Columbia, South Carolina	Inactive	
**George Robert Hall**		University of Southern Mississippi	Hattiesburg, Mississippi	Active	
**Lieutenant General Frank M Andrews**		University of Tennessee	Knoxville, Tennessee	Active	
		University of Utah	Salt Lake City, Utah	Inactive	
**Lieutenant Colonel Michael P. Anderson**		University of Washington	Seattle, Washington	Active	
		University of Wyoming	Laramie, Wyoming	Inactive	
		Washburn University	Topeka, Kansas	Inactive	
		Washington State University	Pullman, Washington	Inactive	
		Washington University in St. Louis	St. Louis, Missouri	Inactive	
**Charles E. Yeager**		West Virginia University	Morgantown, West Virginia	Active	
		Wichita State University	Wichita, Kansas	Inactive	

== See also ==
- List of Arnold Air Society chapters
