= List of Tau Epsilon Phi chapters =

Tau Epsilon Phi is a social collegiate fraternity founded at Columbia University in 1910. In the following is lislt, active chapters are indicated in bold and inactive chapters and institutions are in italics. For historical accuracy and following the fraternity's tradition, the chapters with the single names were the first chapters, followed by the two-word named chapters with the prefixes "Tau", "Epsilon" and "Phi". Chapters after those were named alphabetically by the Greek alphabet.

Number	Chapter	Charter date and range	Institution	Location	Status	Ref.
1	Alpha	October 19, 1910 – 1977	Columbia University	New York City, New York	Inactive	
3	Gamma	October 20, 1912 – 1972	New York University	New York City, New York	Inactive	
2	Beta	June 1, 1913 – 1927	New York College of Dentistry	New York City, New York	Inactive	
4	Delta	November 12, 1913 – 1932; 1939–2013	Cornell University	Ithaca, New York	Inactive	
8	Theta	March 31, 1914 – 1971; 1996–200x ?	Boston University	Boston, Massachusetts	Inactive	
5	Epsilon	June 30, 1914 – 1934	Fordham University	New York City, New York	Inactive	
6	Zeta	February 18, 1915 – 1927	Bellevue Medical Center	New York City, New York	Inactive	
7	Eta	January 21, 1917 – 1933; 1958–1964	Tufts University	Medford, Massachusetts	Inactive	
9	Iota	May 19, 1918 – 1929	Yale University	New Haven, Connecticut	Inactive	
11	Lambda	January 17, 1919 – 1932	Harvard University	Cambridge, Massachusetts	Inactive	
10	Kappa	May 15, 1919 – 1975	University of Vermont	Burlington, Vermont	Inactive	
12	Mu	November 17, 1919 – 1931; 1939–1992	Emory University	Atlanta, Georgia	Inactive	
13	**Nu**	November 17, 1919	University of Georgia	Athens, Georgia	Active	
14	Xi	December 6, 1919 – 1930; 1957 – 2023	Massachusetts Institute of Technology	Boston, Massachusetts	Withdrew	(Note: Chapter reformed in 1957 from the T.E.P. Club, established in 1953.) (Note: In 2023, the Xi chapter de-affiliated with the national Tau Epsilon Phi organization, becoming an independent living group known as the Xi Fellowship. This occurred after an extended, decades-long conflict with the national organization, which wanted the Xi chapter to stop acting as a co-ed living group. The group remains active at MIT.)
15	Omicron	May 1, 1920 – 1939; 1947–1970	McGill University	Montreal, Quebec, Canada	Inactive	
17	**Rho**	April 15, 1921 – 1972; 1985	University of Pennsylvania	Philadelphia, Pennsylvania	Active	
16	Pi	April 16, 1921 – 1931	Georgetown University	Washington, D.C.	Inactive	
18	Sigma	January 28, 1922 – 199x ?	Syracuse University	Syracuse, New York	Inactive	(Note: Chapter absorbed Phi Sigma Delta.)
19	Tau	February 18, 1922 – 1930	Dickenson College	Carlisle, Pennsylvania	Inactive	
20	Upsilon	February 25, 1922 – 1948	College of Charleston	Charleston, South Carolina	Inactive	
21	Phi	May 1, 1922 – 1961	Georgia Institute of Technology	Atlanta, Georgia	Inactive	
22	Chi	January 13, 1923 – 1931; 1959–1973; 1992–200x ?	University of Michigan	Atlanta, Georgia	Inactive	
24	Omega	May 30, 1924 – 2010	University of North Carolina at Chapel Hill	Chapel Hill, North Carolina	Inactive	(Note: Chapter formed from Phi Pi, established in 1923.)
23	Psi	May 31, 1924 – 2006	University of Illinois at Urbana-Champaign	Champaign, Illinois	Inactive	(Note: Chapter formed from Sigma Pi Alpha, established in 1920.)
25	**Tau Alpha**	February 22, 1925 – 1995; 1998–2010; 2011–2018; 2020	University of Florida	Gainesville, Florida	Active	(Note: Chapter formed from Alpha Epsilon Phi, established in 1924. After going dormant, it reformed as a colony in 1997 and 2010.)
26	**Tau Beta**	May 31, 1925 – 2010; 2018	University of Maryland, College Park	College Park, Maryland	Active	(Note: After going dormant, the chapter reformed as a colony in 2015.)
27	Tau Gamma	November 25, 1926 – 1990	University of Southern California	Los Angeles, California	Inactive	(Note: Chapter formed from Tau Epsilon, established in 1926.)
28	**Tau Delta**	May 27, 1927 – 1972; 1990–2002; 2022	Ohio State University	Columbus, Ohio	Active	(Note: Chapter formed by absorbing A.T.A., established in 1926. After going dormant, it was re-established as a colony in 1988.)
29	Tau Epsilon	May 29, 1927 – 1932	West Virginia University	Morgantown, West Virginia	Inactive	(Note: Chapter formed from Alpha Phi Rho, established in 1927.)
30	Tau Zeta	May 29, 1929 – 1999	University of Maine	Orono, Maine	Inactive	
31	Tau Eta	February 21, 1931 – 1963; 1967–1972	University of Denver	Denver, Colorado	Inactive	(Note: Chapter formed from Sigma Beta Sigma, established in 1927. After going dormant, it was reformed as a colony in 1966.)
32	Tau Theta	February 22, 1932 – 1972	George Washington University	Washington, D.C.	Inactive	(Note: Chapter formed from Tau Beta, established in 1931.)
33	Tau Iota	April 9, 1932 – 1982	Dalhousie University	Nova Scotia, Canada	Inactive	(Note: Chapter formed from Phi Mu Alpha, established in 1931.)
34	Tau Kappa	April 30, 1932 – 1939	University of Arkansas	Fayetteville, Arkansas	Inactive	
35	Tau Lambda	May 15, 1932 – 1970	Purdue University	West Lafayette, Indiana	Inactive	(Note: Chapter formed from Thacon, established in 1929.)
36	Tau Mu	May 21, 1932 – 1970; 1988–199x ?	University of Connecticut	Storrs, Connecticut	Inactive	(Note: Chapter formed from the Connecticut Club, established in 1931. After going dormant, it reformed as a colony in 1986.)
37	Tau Nu	April 4, 1936 – 1941; 1988–1993	University of Virginia	Charlottesville, Virginia	Inactive	(Note: Chapter formed from Alpha Mu Sigma, established in 1925. After dormancy, it reformed in 1988 by absorbing Zeta Beta, established in 1987.)
38	Tau Xi	March 28, 1937 – 1972	University of Miami	Coral Gables, Florida	Inactive	(Note: Chapter formed from Delta Epsilon Phi, established in 1936.)
40	Tau Pi	May 12, 1938 – 1977	University of Massachusetts Amherst	Amherst, Massachusetts	Inactive	(Note: Chapter formed from Phi Lambda Tau, established in 1934.)
39	Tau Omicron	May 15, 1937 – 1943; 1947–1952	Alabama Polytechnic Institute	Auburn, Alabama	Inactive	(Note: Chapter formed from Phi Epsilon Tau, established in 1936. After going dormant, it reformed as a colony in 1946.)
41	Tau Rho	February 1, 1947 – 1980	Florida Southern College	Lakeland, Florida	Inactive	(Note: Chapter formed from Beta Delta Nu, established in 1946.)
42	Tau Sigma	April 3, 1947 – 1950	University of Wyoming	Laramie, Wyoming	Inactive	
43	Tau Upsilon	May 27, 1947 – 1962; 1966–1960; 1990–199x ?	University of California, Los Angeles	Los Angeles, California	Inactive	
44	Tau Phi	June 1, 1947 – 1952	Marshall University	Huntington, West Virginia	Inactive	
46	Tau Psi	September 25, 1947 – 2010	New Jersey Institute of Technology	Newark, New Jersey	Inactive	(Note: Chapter formed from Phi Delta Mu, established in 1947.)
45	Tau Chi	October 12, 1947 – 1956	University of Louisville	Louisville, Kentucky	Inactive	
47	Rho Delta Rho	December 20, 1947 – 1993	Illinois Institute of Technology	Chicago, Illinois	Inactive	(Note: Chapter formed from Rho Delta Rho, established in 1920.)
48	**Tau Omega**	April 11, 1948 – 1973; 1975–20xx ?; October 9, 2021	University of Rhode Island	Kingston, Rhode Island	Active	(Note: Chapter formed from Phi Epsilon Tau, established in 1946. After dormancy, it reformed as a provisional chapter (colony) in 1975 and 2018.)
49	Epsilon Alpha	May 1, 1949 – 1950	University of California, Santa Barbara	Santa Barbara, California	Inactive	
50	Epsilon Beta	March 27, 1949 – 1962	Georgia State University	Atlanta, Georgia	Inactive	
51	Epsilon Gamma	June 9, 1949 – 1971	New York University-University Heights	Bronx, New York City, New York	Inactive	(Note: Chapter went defunct in 1972 when NYU closed this campus and merged it with New York University College of Arts and Science.)
52	Epsilon Delta	May 20, 1950 – 1970	Dartmouth College	Hanover, New Hampshire	Inactive	
53	Zeta Lambda Phi	November 11, 1951 – 1973	Temple University	Philadelphia, Pennsylvania	Inactive	(Note: Chapter formed from Zeta Lambda Phi, established in 1928.)
54	Delta Upsilon	April 26, 1952 – 1982	Duke University	Durham, North Carolina	Inactive	(Note: Chapter formed from Tau Epsilon, established in 1951.)
55	Epsilon Deuteron	May 8, 1954 – 1970; 1997–2009	Florida State University	Tallahassee, Florida	Inactive	(Note: Chapter reformed as a colony in 2019 but went dormant before receiving its charter.)
56	Epsilon Eta	June 4, 1955 – 1999	Drexel University	Philadelphia, Pennsylvania	Inactive	(Note: Chapter formed from Alpha Beta Delta, established in 1954.)
57	Epsilon Rho	June 10, 1956 – 1984	Brooklyn College	Brooklyn, New York City, New York	Inactive	(Note: Chapter formed from Alpha Epsilon Rho, established in 1956.)
58	Epsilon Theta	June 10, 1956 – 1971; 199x ?–2020	Queens College, City University of New York	New York City, New York	Inactive	
59	Phi Lambda	June 10, 1956 – 1972	Long Island University	Brooklyn, New York City, New York	Inactive	(Note: Chapter formed from Phi Lambda Tau, established in the 1950s.)
72	**Epsilon Iota**	December 8, 1957 – 1978; October 21, 1995	Rensselaer Polytechnic Institute	Troy, New York	Active	
60	Epsilon Lambda (see Phi Chi)	March 22, 1958 – 1991	City College of New York	New York City, New York	Inactive, Reestablished	
61	Epsilon Zeta	May 17, 1958 – 1959	University of California, Berkeley	Berkeley, California|	Inactive	
63	Epsilon Nu	January 18, 1959 – 2000; 2002–2009	Rochester Institute of Technology	Rochester, New York	Inactive	(Note: Chapter formed from Rho Tau, established in 1957.)
62	Epsilon Mu	January 19, 1959 – 1980	Lehman College	The Bronx, New York City, New York	Inactive	(Note: Chapter formed from Tau Omega Alpha, established in 1952. It was chartered at CUNY Hunter College which became Lehman College in 1967.)
66	Epsilon Kappa	May 12, 1959 – 2007	Tulane University	New Orleans, Louisiana	Inactive	(Note: Chapter formed by absorbing Tau Epsilon, established in 1957.)
64	Phi Gamma	June 5, 1959 – 1971	Wayne State University	Detroit, Michigan	Inactive	(Note: Chapter formed from Gamma Kappa Chi, established in 1937.)
65	Alpha Omega	June 19, 1959 – 19xx ?	Baruch College	New York City, New York	Inactive	
67	Phi Eta	September 27, 1959 – 1993; 2025	Johns Hopkins University	Baltimore, Maryland	Active	(Note: Chapter formed from Phi Alpha, established in 1955.)
68	Alpha Beta	February 27, 1960 – 1971; 1990–199x ?	American University	Washington, D.C.	Inactive	(Note: Chapter formed from Alpha Beta Phi, established in 1957. After going dormant, it reformed as a colony in 1989.)
69	Sigma Phi (see Zeta Gamma Delta)	June 8, 1960 – 1972; 1991–1992	C.W. Post Campus of Long Island University	Brookville, New York	Inactive, Reestablished	(Note: Chapter formed from Sigma Phi Omicron, established in 1959. After going dormant, it reformed by absorbing Zeta Gamma Delta in 1991.)
70	Epsilon Pi	November 13, 1960 – 1995	Marietta College	Marietta, Ohio	Inactive	(Note: Chapter formed from Alpha Pi Delta, established in 1958.)
71	Epsilon Xi	June 3, 1961 – 19xx ?	Clark University	Worcester, Massachusetts	Inactive	
73	Kappa Zeta Phi	October 29, 1961 – 1972; 199x ?–2003	Northeastern University	Boston, Massachusetts	Inactive	(Note: Chapter formed from Kappa Zeta Phi, established in 1927. After going dormant, it reformed as a colony in 1989.)
74	Epsilon Tau	February 2, 1962 –.2006	Bradley University	Peoria, Illinois	Inactive	
75	Epsilon Sigma	November 7, 1962 – 1980	University of Tampa	Tampa, Florida	Inactive	(Note: Chapter formed from Sigma Tau Upsilon, established in 1960.)
76	Epsilon Omicron	June 18, 1963 – 1970	Pratt Institute	Brooklyn, New York	Inactive	(Note: This chapter was formed from the Phi chapter of Alpha Mu Sigma (established in 1958) whose national fraternity had gone dormant.)
77	Delta Tau	June 23, 1963 – 1970	Detroit Institute of Technology	Detroit, Michigan	Inactive	(Note: Chapter went defunct when DIT closed in 1981.)
78	**Epsilon Phi**	May 18, 1963 – 2010; 2017	Pennsylvania State University	State College, Pennsylvania	Active	(Note: Chapter formed as a colony in 1962. Later, it absorbed Tau Delta Phi. After going dormant, it reformed as a colony in 2017.)
79	Alpha Kappa	November 3, 1963 – 1970; 1989–199x ?	Adelphi University	Garden City, New York	Inactive	(Note: Chapter formed from Alpha Kappa, established in 1947. After going dormant, it reformed as a colony in 1988.)
80	Epsilon Psi	April 23, 1964 – 1983	American International College	Springfield, Massachusetts	Inactive	
81	Gamma Sigma (see **Alpha Phi**)	December 19, 1965 – 1985	Rutgers University–New Brunswick	New Brunswick, New Jersey	Inactive, Reestablished	(Note: The chapter formed from Gamma Sigma (local), established in 1947. In 1971, it went coed. Its charter was revoked in 1985 when it refused to return to all-male status, again becoming a local fraternity called Gamma Sigma, the Georgian Society. Later, the national started a new chapter called the Alpha Phi chapter.)
82	Epsilon Omega	June 9, 1966 – 1982	NYU Polytechnic School of Engineering	Brooklyn, New York	Inactive	
83	Phi Delta	October 11, 1966 – 1971	Armstrong State University	Savannah, Georgia	Inactive	
84	Phi Zeta	November 6, 1966 – 1970	University of Wisconsin–Madison	Madison, Wisconsin	Inactive	
85	Phi Alpha	December 18, 1966 – 1971	Hunter College Long Branch	Long Branch, New Jersey	Inactive	
86	Nu Kappa Omega	February 12, 1967 – 1973	Cooper Union	New York City, New York	Inactive	(Note: Chapter formed from Nu Kappa Omega, established in 1963.)
87	Phi Epsilon	November 19, 1966 – 1970	Eastern Michigan University	Ypsilanti, Michigan	Inactive	
88	Kappa Delta	December 18, 1966 – 1974	Monmouth College	Monmouth, Illinois	Inactive	(Note: Chapter formed from Kappa Delta Chi, established in 1961.)
89	**Sigma Epsilon**	December 12, 1966	Rutgers University–Camden	Camden, New Jersey	Active	(Note: Chapter formed from Sigma Epsilon Phi, established in 1956.)
92	Phi Beta	April 23, 1967 – 19xx ?	University of South Florida	Tampa, Florida	Inactive	(Note: Chapter formed from Chi Sigma Rho, established in 1966.)
90	Gamma Delta Xi	June 25, 1967 – 1973	Southampton College of Long Island University	Southampton, New York	Inactive	(Note: Chapter formed from Gamma Delta Xi (local).)
91	Phi Kappa	December 17, 1967 – 1971	DePaul University	Chicago, Illinois	Inactive	
93	Tau Alpha Kappa	November 5, 1967 – 1991	Lehigh University	Bethlehem, Pennsylvania	Inactive	(Note: Chapter formed from Tau Alpha Kappa (local), established in 1964.)
94	Gamma Alpha	November 12, 1967 – 1974	Seton Hall University	South Orange, New Jersey	Inactive	(Note: Chapter formed from Gamma Iota Alpha, established in 1962.)
95	Sigma Lambda	November 19, 1967 – 20xx ?	Bryant College	Smithfield, Rhode Island	Inactive	(Note: Chapter formed from Sigma Lambda Pi, established in 1935.)
96	Phi Mu	November 19, 1967 – 1978; 1990–20xx ?	University of Hartford	West Hartford, Connecticut	Inactive	
97	**Lambda Phi Epsilon**	February 24, 1968 – xxxx ?; June 1, 2011	Clarkson University	Potsdam, New York	Active	(Note: Chapter formed from Lambda Phi Epsilon, established in 1966.)
100	**Phi Upsilon**	May 9, 1968 – 1973; 2020	State University of New York at Buffalo	Buffalo, New York	Active	
98	Phi Nu	April 6, 1968 – 1971	Georgia Southern University	Statesboro, Georgia	Inactive	(Note: Chapter formed from Alpha Phi Epsilon, established in 1967.)
99	Phi Xi	September 8, 1968 – 1974	California State University, Northridge	Los Angeles, California	Inactive	(Note: Chapter formed at San Fernando Valley State College which became California State University, Northridge in 1972.)
101	Beta Upsilon Chi	February 16, 1969 – 1973	Jacksonville University	Jacksonville, Florida	Inactive	(Note: Chapter formed from Buccaneers (local), established in 1957.)
102	Sigma Iota Alpha	March 21, 1969 – 1974	Rhode Island College	Providence, Rhode Island	Inactive	(Note: Chapter formed from Sigma Iota Alpha, established in 1961.)
104	**Sigma Alpha Sigma**	April 4, 1969	Hofstra University	Hempstead, New York	Active	(Note: Chapter formed from Sigma Alpha Sigma, established in 1938.)
103	Phi Delta Upsilon	April 26, 1969 – 1978	Ricker College	Houlton, Maine	Inactive	(Note: Chapter formed from Phi Delta Upsilon. It went defunct when Ricker College closed in 1978.)
109	Phi Omicron	April 26, 1969 – 1995	Western New England University	Springfield, Massachusetts	Inactive	
105	Phi Deuteron	September 28, 1969 – 1972	University of Maine at Portland	Portland, Maine	Inactive	
106	Tau Kappa Beta	February 15, 1970 – 1976	University of New Haven	West Haven, Connecticut	Inactive	(Note: Chapter formed from Tau Kappa Beta, established in 1963.)
111	Phi Pi (see **Eta Tau**)	February 28, 1970 –. 1973; 1988 – August 31, 2018	Binghamton University	Binghamton, New York	Inactive, Reestablished	(Note: BU suspended the chapter for hazing and alcohol violations in 2018, and the fraternity revoked its charter. In 2023, the fraternity authorized Eta Tau Interest Group at BU.)
107	Alpha Gamma Phi	March 7, 1970 – 19xx ?	University of Bridgeport	Bridgeport, Connecticut	Inactive	(Note: Chapter formed from Alpha Gamma Phi, established in 1947.)
108	Theta Gamma Sigma	April 26, 1970 – 1976	Fairleigh Dickinson University	Teaneck, New Jersey	Inactive	(Note: Chapter formed from Theta Gamma Sigma, established in 1965.)
110	Mu Alpha Delta	May 6, 1970 – 1973	New York Institute of Technology	Old Westbury, New York	Inactive	(Note: Chapter formed by absorbing Mu Alpha Delta (local), established in the 1960s.)
112	Tau Eta Epsilon	October 25, 1970 – 1973; 1987–200x ?	State University of New York at New Paltz	New Paltz, New York	Inactive	(Note: Chapter formed from Tau Eta Epsilon (local), established in 1968. After going dormant, it reformed as a colony in 1985.)
113	Omega Lambda Chi (see Delta Epsilon)	March 4, 1971 – 19xx ?	Biscayne College	Miami Gardens, Florida	Inactive, Reestablished	(Note: Chapter formed from Omega Lambda Chi, established in the 1960s. It was chartered at Biscayne College which became St. Thomas University in 1984. After going dormant, the chapter reformed as Delta Epsilon chapter.)
114	Pi Rho	October 13, 1972 – 1977	University of Massachusetts Lowell	Lowell, Massachusetts	Inactive	(Note: Chapter formed from Pi Rho (local), established in 1971.)
115	Omega Upsilon Chi	November 15, 1976 – 200x ?	Husson University	Bangor, Maine	Inactive	(Note: Chapter formed from Omega Upsilon Chi (local), established in 1974.)
117	Phi Sigma Chi	April 14, 1982 – 1986	California State Polytechnic University, Pomona	Pomona, California	Inactive	
116	Pi Beta	April 12, 1984 – 1984, 19xx ?–200x ?	University of Maine at Presque Isle	Presque Isle, Maine	Inactive	
118	Kappa Iota Chi	1986–xxxx ?	University of North Carolina at Asheville	Asheville, North Carolina	Inactive	
120	Kappa Gamma	1985–19xx ?	Virginia Commonwealth University	Richmond, Virginia	Inactive	
123	Tau Sigma Upsilon Colony		Towson University	Towson, Maryland	Inactive	(Note: This colony was formed from Tau Sigma Upsilon (local), established in the 1970s. However, it went dormant before being chartered.) (Note: Colony operated from February 1, 1985 – 19xx ?.)
119	Omega Beta Psi	October 17, 1985 – xxxx ?	State University of New York at Geneseo	Geneseo, New York	Withdrew	(Note: Chapter formed from Omega Beta Psi (local), established in 1984. Later, it dropped its national charter and became a local fraternity.)
121					Inactive	
124	Delta Xi	October 10, 1986 – xxxx ?	University of Lynchburg	Lynchburg, Virginia	Inactive	(Note: Chapter formed from the T.E.P. Club, established in 1986.)
122	**Alpha Sigma**	October 19, 1986 – 1999	State University of New York at Albany	Albany, New York	Colony	(Note: Reformed as a colony in 2019.)
125	Delta Epsilon (see Omega Lambda Chi)	October 27, 1987 – 200x ?	St. Thomas University	Miami Gardens, Florida	Inactive	
126	Beta Delta	August 24, 1988 – 199x ?	Florida International University	Miami, Florida	Inactive	
127	Alpha Phi (see Gamma Sigma)	October 29, 1988 – 1991; 1996–2014; 2018-2023	Rutgers University–New Brunswick	New Brunswick, New Jersey	Inactive	
129	Phi Tau	April 4, 1989 – xxxx ?	Roger Williams University	Bristol, Rhode Island	Inactive	
131	Phi Upsilon	February 3, 1990 – 199x ?	State University of New York at Oneonta	Oneonta, New York	Inactive	
130	Delta Psi Omega	June 9, 1990 – 199x ?	William Paterson University	Wayne, New Jersey	Inactive	(Note: Chapter formed from Delta Psi Omega, established in 1983.)
132	Gamma Delta	June 9, 1990 – 1999	University of Maryland, Baltimore County	Baltimore County, Maryland	Inactive	
128	Phi Sigma	June 8, 1991 – 199x ?	Marist College	Poughkeepsie, New York	Inactive	
133	Phi Chi (see Epsilon Lambda)	June 8, 1991 – xxxx ?; June 1, 2011 – 20xx ?	City College of New York	New York City, New York	Inactive	(Note: Chapter formed from Grav House (local), established in 1958.)
134	Zeta Gamma Delta (see Sigma Phi)	June 8, 1991 – late 1990s	C.W. Post Campus of Long Island University	Brookville, New York	Inactive	
135	**Phi Psi**	October 19, 1991 – 2000; May 1, 2022	University of Delaware	Newark, Delaware	Colony	
136	Phi Omega Colony		Mount Ida College	Newton, Massachusetts	Inactive	(Note: Colony operated from October 10, 1991 – 199x ?.)
137	Rho Beta	April 1, 1995 – 2009	University of Pittsburgh	Pittsburgh, Pennsylvania	Inactive	(Note: Chapter formed from Rho Beta (local), established in 1995.)
139	Sigma Mu Colony		Limestone College	Gaffney, South Carolina	Inactive	(Note: Colony operated April 11, 1996 – 199x ?.)
138	**Omega Alpha**	November 2, 1996	Johnson & Wales University	Providence, Rhode Island	Active	
141	Beta Tau	2016–20xx ?	Arizona State University	Tempe, Arizona	Inactive	
140	**Alpha Tau**	2017	Rowan University	Glassboro, New Jersey	Active	
143	Zeta Tau Colony		University of North Carolina Wilmington	Wilmington, North Carolina	Inactive	(Note: Colony operated from 2018 to 20xx ?)
142	**Gamma Tau**	November 2017	Indiana University Bloomington	Bloomington, Indiana	Active	
144	**Eta Tau Interest Group** (see Phi Pi)		Binghamton University	Binghamton, New York	Colony	(Note: Colony formed in 2023.)
