= List of Phi Sigma Delta chapters =

Phi Sigma Delta was a collegiate fraternity established in 1909 with a predominantly Jewish membership. It merged into Zeta Beta Tau in 1969.

== Chapters ==
Following is a list of chapters of Phi Sigma Delta.

Chapter	Charter date and range	Institution	Location	Status	Ref.
Alpha	November 10, 1910 – 1933; 1955–1969	Columbia University	New York City, New York	Merged (ΖΒΤ)	(Note: Merged with an existing chapter of Zeta Beta Tau at the time of the national merger of the two fraternities.)
Beta	1912–1969	Cornell University	Ithaca, New York	Merged (ΑΕΠ)	(Note: Chapter merged with an existing Alpha Epsilon Pi chapter.)
Gamma	1913–1969	Rensselaer Polytechnic Institute	Troy, New York	Merged (ΖΒΤ)	
Delta	1913–1969	New York University-University Heights	University Heights, Bronx, New York	Merged (ΣΑΜ)	(Note: Chapter merged with an existing Sigma Alpha Mu chapter.)
Epsilon	1914–1969	Union College	Schenectady, New York	Merged (ΖΒΤ)	(Note: Chapter revived an inactive Zeta Beta Tau chapter with the national merger of the two fraternities.)
Zeta	1916–1969	University of Pennsylvania	Philadelphia, Pennsylvania	Merged (ΖΒΤ)	
Eta	1916–1969	University of Michigan	Ann Arbor, Michigan	Merged (ΖΒΤ)	
Theta	1919–1969	University of Colorado Boulder	Boulder, Colorado	Merged (ΖΒΤ)	
Iota	1920–1969	University of Denver	Denver, Colorado	Merged (ΖΒΤ)	(Note: Became a Zeta Beta Tau chapter at the time of the national merger of the two fraternities.)
Kappa	1920–1969	Case Western Reserve University	Cleveland, Ohio	Merged (ΖΒΤ)	
Lambda	1920–1969	University of Texas at Austin	Austin, Texas	Merged (ΖΒΤ)	
Mu	1921–1969	University of Chicago	Chicago, Illinois	Merged (ΖΒΤ)	
Nu	1921–1927	Massachusetts Institute of Technology	Cambridge, Massachusetts	Inactive	
Xi	1921–1933, 1959–1969	Boston University	Boston, Massachusetts	Merged (ΖΒΤ)	(Note: After going dormant, the chapter reformed from the Alpha Club (local), established in 1956. Later, it absorbed Phi Alpha (local).)
Omicron	1921–1969	Ohio State University	Columbus, Ohio	Merged (ΖΒΤ)	
Pi	1922–1969	University of Wisconsin–Madison	Madison, Wisconsin	Merged (ΖΒΤ)	
Rho	1923–1969	Johns Hopkins University	Baltimore, Maryland	Merged (ΖΒΤ)	
Tau	1925 – 1933	Lehigh University	Bethlehem, Pennsylvania	Merged (ΖΒΤ)	(Note: Chapter formed from Beta Phi (local), established in 1924.)
Sigma	1927–1969	Pennsylvania State University	State College, Pennsylvania	Merged (ΖΒΤ)	(Note: Chapter formed from Mu Alpha Sigma (local), established in 1925.)
Upsilon	1927–1969	West Virginia University	Morgantown, West Virginia	Merged (ΖΒΤ)	(Note: Chapter formed from Mu Delta Mu (local), established in 1925.)
Phi	1928–1969	University of Vermont	Burlington, Vermont	Merged (ΖΒΤ)	(Note: After going dormant, the chapter reformed from Phi Zeta Sigma (local), established in 1934.)
Chi	1929–1936	Duke University	Durham, North Carolina	Inactive	
Psi	1929–1939	University of Alabama	Tuscaloosa, Alabama	Inactive	
Omega	1931–1964	University of Missouri	Columbia, Missouri	Inactive	(Note: Chapter formed from Sigma Delta Gamma (local), established in 1930.)
Alpha Alpha	1943–1969	University of Connecticut	Storrs, Connecticut	Merged (ΖΒΤ)	
Alpha Beta	1947–1969	University of Southern California	Los Angeles, California	Merged (ΖΒΤ)	
Alpha Gamma	1947–1969	University of Illinois at Urbana–Champaign	Urbana, Illinois	Merged (ΖΒΤ)	
Alpha Delta	1948–1969	Ohio University	Athens, Ohio	Inactive	(Note: Chapter formed from Sigma Delta (local), established in 1947.)
Alpha Epsilon	1949–1969	Syracuse University	Syracuse, New York	Merged (ΖΒΤ)	
Alpha Zeta	1952–1966	University of Miami	Coral Gables, Florida	Inactive	(Note: Chapter formed from the Pyramid Club (local), established in 1948.)
Alpha Eta	1952–1969	Colorado State University	Fort Collins, Colorado	Merged (ΖΒΤ)	
Alpha Theta	1952–1969	Rutgers University–New Brunswick	New Brunswick, New Jersey	Merged (ΖΒΤ)	(Note: Chapter formed from Phi Sigma Club (local), established in 1950.)
Alpha Iota	1952–1966	New York University, Washington Square	Greenwich Village, New York	Inactive	
Alpha Kappa	1955–1961	University of Utah	Salt Lake City, Utah	Inactive	
Alpha Lambda	1957–1969	University of Detroit Mercy	Detroit, Michigan	Inactive	
Alpha Mu	1957–1969	University of Massachusetts Amherst	Amherst, Massachusetts	Withdrew	(Note: Chapter formed from the Triangle Club (local), established in 1951.) (Note: Withdrew from Phi Sigma Delta at the time of the national merger and became Phi Sigma (local), then Q.T.V.)
Alpha Nu	1957–1969	University of Wisconsin–Milwaukee	Milwaukee, Wisconsin	Merged (ΖΒΤ)	(Note: Chapter formed from Phi Sigma (local), established in 1956.)
Alpha Xi	1958–1969	LIU Post	Brookville, New York	Merged (ΖΒΤ)	
Alpha Omicron	1959–1969	Pratt Institute	Brooklyn, New York	Merged (ΖΒΤ)	
Phi Alpha	1959–1969	George Washington University	Washington, D.C.	Merged (ΖΒΤ)	(Note: Chapter formed from the Alpha chapter of Phi Alpha, originally established October 14, 1913.)
Phi Beta	1959–1969	University of Maryland at Baltimore	Baltimore, Maryland	Withdrew	(Note: Chapter formed from the Beta chapter of Phi Alpha, originally established on February 22, 1916.)
Phi Gamma	1959–1969	Georgetown University	Washington, D.C.	Inactive	(Note: Chapter formed from the Gamma chapter of Phi Alpha, originally established on December 26, 1916.)
Phi Delta	1959–1969	Northwestern University	Evanston, Illinois	Inactive	(Note: Chapter formed from the Delta chapter of Phi Alpha, originally established on February 16, 1918.)
Phi Epsilon	1959–1969	University of Maryland, College Park	College Park, Maryland	Inactive	(Note: Chapter formed from the Epsilon chapter of Phi Alpha, originally established on April 2, 1919.) (Note: Chapter withdrew at the time of the merger and became Phi Beta (local), which operated until 1990.)
Phi Zeta	1959–1924	Yale University	New Haven, Connecticut	Inactive	(Note: Chapter formed from the Zeta chapter of Phi Alpha, originally established on December 7, 1919.)
Phi Lambda	1959–1927	DePaul University	Chicago, Illinois	Inactive	(Note: Chapter formed from the Lambda chapter of Phi Alpha, originally established on February 19, 1921.)
Phi Mu	1959–1969	University of Virginia	Charlottesville, Virginia	Inactive	(Note: Chapter formed from the Mu chapter of Phi Alpha, originally established on April 16, 1922.)
Phi Nu	1959–1969	Clark University	Worcester, Massachusetts	Inactive	(Note: Chapter formed from the Nu chapter of Phi Alpha, originally established on March 16, 1924.)
Phi Omicron	1959–1969	University of New Hampshire	Durham, New Hampshire	Inactive	(Note: Chapter formed from the Omicron chapter of Phi Alpha, originally established in 1924.)
Phi Pi	1959–1969	Boston University	Boston, Massachusetts	Inactive	(Note: Chapter formed from the Pi chapter of Phi Alpha, originally established in 1924.)
Phi Rho	1959–1969	University of Richmond	Richmond, Virginia	Merged (ΖΒΤ)	(Note: Chapter formed from the Rho chapter of Phi Alpha, originally established by February 6, 1925.)
Phi Sigma	1959–1969	New York University Tandon School of Engineering	Brooklyn, New York	Merged (ΖΒΤ)	(Note: Chapter formed from the Sigma chapter of Phi Alpha, originally established on October 25, 1925.)
Phi Phi	1959–1969	Duquesne University	Pittsburgh, Pennsylvania	Merged (ΖΒΤ)	(Note: Chapter formed from the Phi chapter of Phi Alpha, originally established on March 19, 1927.)
Phi Alpha Beta	1959–1969	Temple University	Philadelphia, Pennsylvania	Merged (ΖΒΤ)	(Note: Chapter formed from a chapter of Phi Alpha, originally established on May 4, 1929.)
Phi Alpha Gamma	1961–1969	Wayne State University	Detroit, Michigan	Merged (ΖΒΤ)	(Note: Chapter formed from a chapter of Phi Alpha, originally established on December 7, 1930.)
Phi Alpha Eta	1959–1969	City College of New York	New York City, New York	Inactive	(Note: Chapter formed from a chapter of Phi Alpha, originally established in 1940.)
Phi Alpha Kappa	1959–1969	Lehman College	Bronx, New York	Inactive	(Note: Chapter formed from a chapter of Phi Alpha, originally established in 1957.)
Phi Alpha Mu	1959–1969	City College of New York, Uptown	New York City, New York	Merged (ΖΒΤ)	(Note: Chapter formed from a chapter of Phi Alpha, originally established in 1959.)
Kappa Nu	1961–1969	Brooklyn College	Brooklyn, New York	Merged (ΖΒΤ)	
Alpha Pi	1963–1969	University of Rhode Island	Kingston, Rhode Island	Merged (ΖΒΤ)	
Alpha Rho	1963–1969	Washington University in St. Louis	St. Louis, Missouri	Merged (ΖΒΤ)	
Alpha Sigma	1963–1969	Michigan State University	East Lansing, Michigan	Inactive	
Alpha Tau	1964–1969	Long Island University	Brooklyn, New York	Inactive	
Alpha Upsilon	1965–1969	Adelphi University	Garden City, New York	Inactive	(Note: Chapter formed from Alpha Phi Beta (local), established in 1947.)
Alpha Phi	1965–1969	Parsons College	Greenwich Village, New York	Merged (ΖΒΤ)	
Colony	1969–1969	Queens College, City University of New York	Flushing, Queens, New York	Merged (ΖΒΤ)	
Colony	1969–1969	Seton Hall University	South Orange, New Jersey	Merged (ΖΒΤ)	
Colony	1969–1969	American University	Washington, D.C.	Merged (ΑΕΠ)	(Note: Colony became an Alpha Epsilon Pi chapter at the time of the national merger.)
