= Mississippi State, Mississippi =

Mississippi State
- Census-designated place
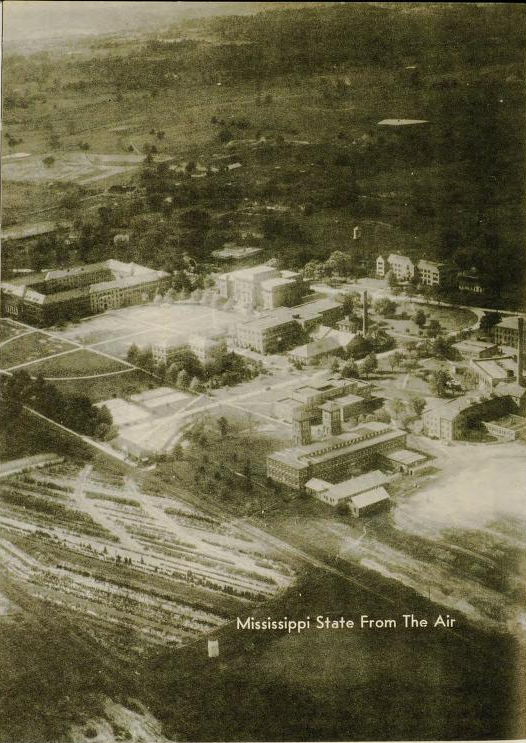
- Aerial view of the namesake university's campus, c. 1938

- Location within Mississippi Location within the United States
- Country: United States
- State: Mississippi
- County: Oktibbeha

Area
  - Total: 2.36 sq mi (6.10 km^{2})
  - Land: 2.34 sq mi (6.06 km^{2})
  - Water: 0.015 sq mi (0.04 km^{2})

Population (2020)
  - Total: 4,968
  - Density: 2,124.7/sq mi (820.37/km^{2})
- Time zone: UTC−6 (Central (CST))
  - Summer (DST): UTC−5 (CDT)
- FIPS code: 28-48030

Mississippi State is a census-designated place (CDP) in Oktibbeha County, Mississippi, United States. It is the official designated name for the area encompassing Mississippi State University, which lies partly in the nearby incorporated municipality of Starkville. The population at the 2020 census was 4,968.

United States Postal Service designation is "Mississippi State, Mississippi 39762".

== Demographics ==
Historical population
Census	Pop.	Note	%±
2010	4,005		—
2020	4,968		24.0%
U.S. Decennial Census; 2010 2020

Mississippi State first appeared as a census designated place in the 2010 U.S. census.

=== Racial and ethnic composition ===
Mississippi State CDP, Mississippi – Racial and ethnic composition Note: the US Census treats Hispanic/Latino as an ethnic category. This table excludes Latinos from the racial categories and assigns them to a separate category. Hispanics/Latinos may be of any race.
Race / Ethnicity (NH = Non-Hispanic)	Pop 2010	Pop 2020	% 2010	% 2020
White alone (NH)	2,700	3,529	67.42%	71.03%
Black or African American alone (NH)	1,042	993	26.02%	19.99%
Native American or Alaska Native alone (NH)	9	26	0.22%	0.52%
Asian alone (NH)	108	90	2.70%	1.81%
Pacific Islander alone (NH)	1	3	0.02%	0.06%
Some Other Race alone (NH)	7	120	0.17%	2.42%
Mixed Race or Multi-Racial (NH)	58	26	1.45%	0.52%
Hispanic or Latino (any race)	80	181	2.00%	3.64%
Total	4,005	4,968	100.00%	100.00%

=== 2020 census ===
As of the 2020 census, Mississippi State had a population of 4,968. The median age was 19.6 years. For every 100 females, there were 79.4 males, and for every 100 females age 18 and over, there were 79.0 males age 18 and over.

Of residents, 1.2% were under the age of 18 and 0.5% were 65 years of age or older. There were 105 households, of which 39.0% had children under the age of 18 living in them. Of all households, 36.2% were married-couple households, 26.7% were households with a male householder and no spouse or partner present, and 30.5% were households with a female householder and no spouse or partner present. About 15.3% of all households were made up of individuals, and 3.9% had someone living alone who was 65 years of age or older.

There were 131 housing units, of which 19.8% were vacant. The homeowner vacancy rate was 6.5%, and the rental vacancy rate was 15.6%. Of residents, 99.8% lived in urban areas, while 0.2% lived in rural areas.
