= List of Trine University fraternities and sororities =

Fraternities and sororities have maintained a visible presence on the Trine University campus for 100 years. The campus hosts ten honor societies that recognize scholastic achievement, complimenting 13 active undergraduate social fraternities and sororities. Local societies had been predominant during the earlier, non-accredited era of campus growth, but beginning in 1947, national fraternities and then sororities colonized and now make up the majority of chapters. Tri-State's first men's social fraternity, Sigma Mu Sigma formed in 1921, and its first women's social sorority, Sigma Alpha Gamma (local) formed in 1926.

As of 2018, 26% of male and 19% of female undergraduates are involved in these groups.

== Fraternities ==
A list of fraternities on campus follows. Active groups are in bold and inactive groups are in italics. (NIC) indicates members of the North American Interfraternity Conference. (FFC) indicates members of the Fraternity Forward Coalition. (PFA) indicates members of the Professional Fraternity Association.

=== Active Fraternities ===
- Acacia, 1967–1979, 2012 (NIC) (Note: Trine University's Acacia chapter was originally formed when an alumnus of Sigma Mu Sigma, Clyde E. Shaw who was a faculty member at Tri-State, revived "his" fraternity of ΣΜΣ in 1940. This was four years after his original chapter had merged into Alpha Lambda Tau. This new Alpha chapter changed membership requirements to allow non-Masons to join. Alpha chapter was the only active chapter of ΣΜΣ from 1940–1952. In August 1952, Sigma Mu Sigma decided to merge with Sigma Alpha Chi, which was another Masonic fraternity originally known as Square and Compass. The resulting union, called Sigma Mu Sigma – Square and Compass, would eventually form 12 chapters. It dissolved in the 1960s, with the Trine chapter going on to join Acacia Fraternity in 1967. This chapter became dormant in 1980 and re-colonized in 2012.)
- Alpha Sigma Phi, 1935 (FFC, formerly NIC) (Note: Began as a local fraternity in 1924, which joined Alpha Delta Alpha in 1930 as its Eta chapter, and at that national's demise, joined Alpha Kappa Pi in 1935 as its Alpha Beta chapter. That second, smaller national merged into Alpha Sigma Phi in 1946, becoming its Beta Omicron chapter.)
- Delta Chi, 1969 (NIC)
- Kappa Sigma, 1966 (formerly NIC) (Note: Trine University's first ΤΚΕ chapter was originally the founding chapter of Sigma Mu Sigma fraternity, established on March 25, 1921, which over a decade spread to nine campuses. It was originally limited to Master Masons. With conditions worsening in the Great Depression, its small national organization voted in the Fall of 1934 to merge with ΤΚΕ, but the Tri-State Alpha chapter remained independent, likely due to non-accreditation. In 1936 it became the Psi chapter of Alpha Lambda Tau. That small non-NIC national would itself merge into ΤΚΕ in 1947 in another merger. Following this, the NIC demanded that ΤΚΕ revoke the charter for the group at Tri-State if they wanted to remain in the NIC because Tri-State College was still non-accredited. Hence, ΤΚΕ revoked the charter of its Beta-Epsilon chapter at its next Conclave. The chapter then affiliated with Kappa Sigma Kappa in 1952. When small Kappa Sigma Kappa merged into Theta Xi in 1962, likewise a NIC fraternity, the chapter was again ineligible for the merger due to the accreditation status of Tri-State University. So the chapter petitioned Kappa Sigma and became a chapter of that fraternity in 1966, enduring until the accreditation turmoil had passed. This is the short history of the Trine University Kappa Sigma chapter. Decades after Tri-State University became accredited, ΤΚΕ established a new chapter on the campus in 1989. The new chapter retained the Beta-Epsilon chapter designation and honors the founding date of the original ΤΚΕ chapter, even though that original campus group is now a chapter of Kappa Sigma.) (Note: This chapter's history dates to March 25, 1921, as the founding chapter of Sigma Mu Sigma; it severed ties with the resulting small national it had formed as of 1934, and after several stages, eventually found Kappa Sigma.)
- Phi Kappa Theta, 1966 (NIC)
- Sigma Phi Delta, 1947 engineering professional (formerly PFA)
- Sigma Phi Epsilon, 1968 (formerly NIC) (Note: This chapter originated on December 17, 1927, when it was established as the Delta Epsilon chapter of Phi Sigma Chi. On May 8, 1949, the chapter affiliated with Alpha Gamma Upsilon as ΑΓΥ's Lambda chapter. It became Indiana Theta chapter of Sigma Phi Epsilon on May 4, 1968.)
- Tau Kappa Epsilon, 1947–1948, 1989 (NIC) (Note: Beta Sigma Tau merged with Pi Lambda Phi in late 1960. The Trine chapter did not follow the merger and reverted into a local called Beta Sigma Chi, which then joined ΤΚΕ in 1966 as a merger into an existing chapter or revival according to the Almanac of Fraternities and Sororities. However, ΤΚΕ records indicate a re-chartering in 1989, with no detail on the absorption of ΒΣΧ in the two decades prior.)

=== Inactive fraternities ===
- Alpha Delta Alpha, 1930–1934, became Alpha Kappa Pi (Note: Originally ΦΛΤ (local). The Eta chapter of this small national fraternity dissolved in 1934. Successor was ΑΚΠ.)
- Alpha Gamma Omega (local), 1940–1965, became Phi Kappa Theta
- Alpha Gamma Upsilon, 1949–1968, became Sigma Phi Epsilon (Note: Most chapters of ΑΓΥ were absorbed by ΑΣΦ; a few scattered to other nationals, as did the Tri-State chapter, which became a chapter of ΣΦΕ.)
- Alpha Kappa Pi, 1935–1946, became Alpha Sigma Phi
- Alpha Lambda Tau, 1936–1947, became Tau Kappa Epsilon
- Beta Phi Sigma (local), 1922–1932, became Delta Kappa Phi
- Beta Phi Theta, 1929–1969, became Delta Chi (Note: This was the Delta chapter, and only surviving chapter after 1956, of this small national.)
- Beta Sigma Chi, 1960–1966?, revived Tau Kappa Sigma
- Beta Sigma Tau, 1950–1960, became Beta Sigma Chi
- Catholic Club (local), 1929–1940, became Alpha Gamma Omega
- Delta Kappa Phi, 1932–1936 (Note: This was the short-lived Kappa chapter of this dormant, small national. Note, this fraternity was founded at Marshall College in West Virginia in 1929, and dissolved in the 1930s. It was distinct from the textiles fraternity of the same name.)
- Four-Eleven Gang (local), 1922–1927, became Lambda Phi Epsilon
- Gamma Eta Alpha (local), 1927–1931, became Phi Iota Alpha
- Kadimah Society, 1936–1948, became Theta Mu Phi
- Kappa Sigma Kappa, 1952–1962, reverted to Sigma Mu Sigma (Note: ΚΣΚ was a junior NIC member which merged with Theta Xi national in 1962. Trine's chapter reverted to local status due to the accreditation problem that would persist for another year. Seven chapters of ΚΣΚ formed a schismatic junior-college-focused third reinvention of Kappa Sigma Kappa, which persisted for a few years after the merger, and which claimed the Tri-State chapter, but once the accreditation matter was resolved, in 1966, the Tri-State chapter would petition and join Kappa Sigma. The Almanac of Fraternities and Sororities notes it again using the name ΚΣΚ before 1966.)
- Lambda Phi Epsilon (local), 1927–1929, became Beta Phi Theta (Note: Baird's Manual Archive Online notes this group formed in 1922. Latter date supported by other sources.)
- Nu Pi (local), 1981–1989, became Triangle
- Phi Iota Alpha, 1931–1955 (NALFO and NIC)
- Phi Lambda Alpha, 1929–1931, became Phi Iota Alpha (Note: This chapter grew out of the "Club Hispano-Americano," a local chapter founded in 1921 at Tri-State. Joining Phi Lambda Alpha in 1929 and later joined by ΓΗΑ, this chapter continued for an unknown period. The national would soon merge into Phi Iota Alpha, which remains a member of the NALFO and the NIC.)
- Phi Lambda Tau (local), 1925–1929, became Alpha Delta Alpha
- Phi Sigma Chi, 1927–1934, 1936–1949, became Sigma Delta Rho, reverted to Phi Sigma Chi, became Alpha Gamma Upsilon (Note: In those pre-accreditation days, was this original chapter a unit of the preparatory school fraternity, Phi Sigma Chi? Or was it a local with the same name?)
- Sigma Delta Rho, 1934–1936, (NIC), reverted to Phi Sigma Chi, later became Alpha Gamma Upsilon (Note: This was the last chapter of a small national Sigma Delta Rho to form before that fraternity's dissolution in 1935.)
- Sigma Mu Sigma, 1921–1936, 1940–1952, 1962–1966, became Alpha Lambda Tau, Kappa Sigma, Tau Kappa Epsilon, Kappa Sigma Kappa and Acacia (Note: Arguably the most prolific chapter of any fraternity, this local chapter birthed three successor chapters on the Trine campus and twice, a surviving, small national fraternity. Originally a Masonic-themed organization, see reference notes for these three resulting campus chapters.)
- Square M Club (local), 1921-1921, became Sigma Mu Sigma
- Tau Kappa Lambda (local), 1949–1952, became Kappa Sigma Kappa
- Tau Sigma (local), 1970–1981, became Nu Pi
- Theta Mu Phi, 1948–1950, became Beta Sigma Tau
- Triangle, 1989–2008 (NIC)

== Sororities ==
A list of the sororities on campus follows. Chapters are listed in order of date established, with active groups in bold and inactive groups in italics. (NPC) indicates members of the National Panhellenic Conference. (local) indicates a chapter unaffiliated with a national organization.

=== Active sororities ===
- Alpha Sigma Tau, 2008 (NPC) (Note: Local installation date of the Epsilon Kappa chapter was September 26, 2009.)
- Gamma Phi Epsilon (local), 1995 (Note: This organization was formed on February 14, 1995.)
- Kappa Sigma Alpha (local), 1991
- Theta Phi Alpha, 2012 (NPC) (Note: Originally established as Zeta Theta Epsilon (local) in 1998, this is the Gamma Omega chapter of ΘΦΑ, installed on December 15, 2012.)

=== Inactive sororities ===
- Alpha Omega Epsilon (local), 1999–2002, 2004–2006, became Alpha Sigma Tau (Note: It appears the local Trine chapter called Alpha Omega Epsilon was not affiliated with the national professional sorority of the same name, but rather, took the same name by coincidence.)
- Alpha Theta Pi (local), 2005–20xx ?
- Kappa Beta Gamma, 2011–2016
- Kappa Tau Sigma (local), 1954-19xx ?
- Lambda Rho Mu (local), 19xx ?–19xx ?
- Omega Kappa (local), 1960?–19xx ?
- Phi Sigma (local), 1996–2023
- Phi Sigma Sigma, 1992–1996 (NPC), became Phi Sigma (Note: This was the Zeta Upsilon chapter of ΦΣΣ, reverting to local status on March 17, 1996.)
- Sigma Alpha Gamma (local), 1926-193x ?
- Sigma Kappa, 1977–1983 (NPC) (Note: This was the Zeta Theta chapter of ΣΚ.)
- Zeta Eta Theta (local), 1982–19xx ?
- Zeta Theta Epsilon (local), 1998–2012, became Theta Phi Alpha (Note: This group had its origin as the little sisters of ΤΚΕ, before 1998)

== Honor and professional fraternities ==
Trine University hosts several honor societies. These include:

- Pi Tau Sigma, 1972, honor, mechanical engineering (Note: This is the Tri-State Delta Delta chapter of ΠΤΣ.)
- Chi Epsilon, 1973, honor, civil and environmental engineering (Note: This is the Trine chapter of ΧΕ.)
- Tau Beta Pi, 1975, honor, engineering (Note: This is the Indiana Epsilon chapter of ΤΒΠ.)
- Eta Kappa Nu, 1975, honor, electrical engineering (Note: This is the Zeta Phi chapter of ΗΚΝ.)
- Delta Mu Delta, 1977, honor, business (Note: This is the Gamma Theta chapter of ΔΜΔ. Baird's says it was formed on May 11, 1977, while the school summary page says 2004. The latter date appears to be a restoration of the chapter.)
- Omega Chi Epsilon, 1980, honor, chemical engineering (Note: This is the Alpha Nu chapter of ΩΧΕ.)
- Beta Beta Beta, 1980, honor, biological sciences (Note: This is the Xi Beta chapter of ΔΜΔ.)
- Pi Sigma Alpha, 1981, honor, political sciences (Note: This is the Mu Xi chapter of ΠΣΑ.)
- Phi Eta Sigma, 1983, honor, first-year academic achievement (Note: This is the Trine University chapter of ΦΗΣ.)
- Order of Omega, 2008, honor, Greek Life leadership (Note: This is the Phi Lambda chapter of the Order of Omega.)
- Sigma Tau Delta, honor, English (Note: This is the Alpha Alpha Gamma chapter of ΣΤΔ.<)
- Lambda Alpha Epsilon, honor, criminal justice (Note: This is the Tau Alpha Omicron chapter of ΛΑΕ.)
