= Kappa Sigma Kappa =

International collegiate fraternity (defunct)

- ΚΣΚ
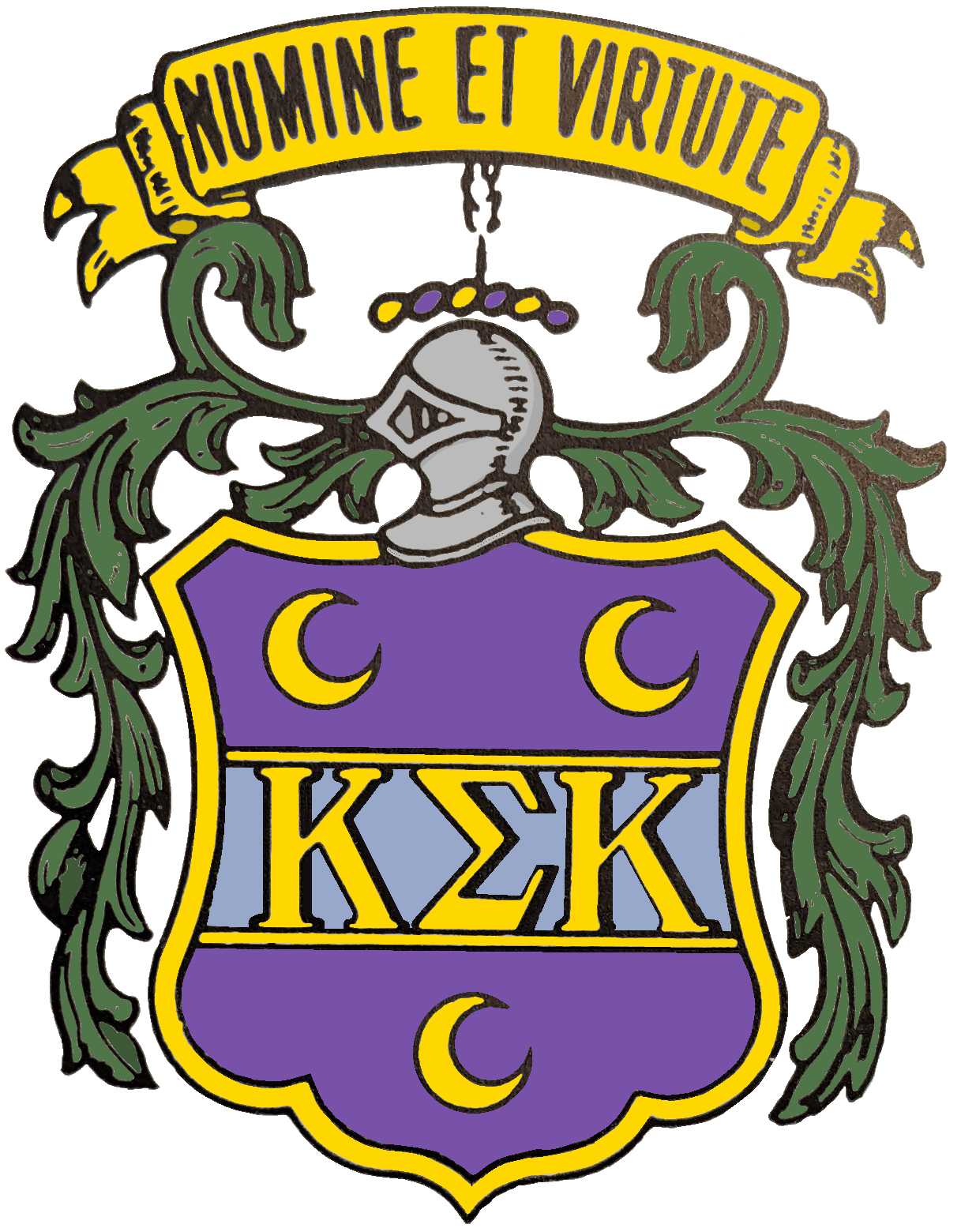
- Founded: September 28, 1867; 159 years ago Virginia Military Institute
- Type: Social
- Affiliation: Independent
- Status: Defunct
- Defunct date: 1992
- Scope: International
- Member badge
- Colors: Royal Purple and Gold
- Flower: Purple iris
- Publication: The Iris of Kappa Sigma Kappa
- Chapters: 30 (third iteration)
- Headquarters: Lexington, Virginia; United States
- Website: www.ksk.org

Kappa Sigma Kappa (ΚΣΚ) is the name of three separate college fraternities, sharing a common history and traditions but disconnected by decades and a break in organizational continuity. The original incarnation of Kappa Sigma Kappa was formed at Virginia Military Institute on September 28, 1867. Most of its active chapters merged into Phi Delta Theta in 1886.

A larger, second incarnation sparked by the memory of the first group at the University of Virginia was formed approximately fifty years after the first merger, leading to the creation of over seventy new chapters. Many of these would later merge into Theta Xi in 1962. Some of Kappa Sigma Kappa's chapters were unable to join in this merger due to NIC rules, leading to a third incarnation of the fraternity. In the late 1970's, this third edition of Kappa Sigma Kappa dissipated as a formal entity. One chapter remained active until 1992.

== First incarnation (1867–1886) ==
=== History ===
Kappa Sigma Kappa was founded at Virginia Military Institute on September 28, 1867, by four cadets:

- John M. Tutwiler
- James Gunnell Hurst
- Kenneth McDonald
- David Gamble Murrell

On that night, Tutwiler invited the three other cadets to his room where the fraternity was founded. The original name selected for the fraternity was C.E.C., but it was soon changed to Kappa Sigma Kappa. The letters "C.E.C." would continue to retain ritual significance in the new fraternity. As a result of their efforts, ten chapters had been chartered by 1885.

After the closure of several chapters, five of its remaining chapters became part of Phi Delta Theta in 1886. One chapter merged into Sigma Nu.

=== Symbols and traditions ===
The badge was a gold Jerusalem cross in the center of which is a circular black enameled disc displaying the letters of the fraternity. The letters "C.E.C." are engraved on the back of every badge.

=== Chapters ===
These are the chapters of the first iteration of Kappa Sigma Kappa, many of which left to join Phi Delta Theta in 1886. Inactive chapters and institutions are listed in italics.

Chapter	Charter date and range	Institution	Location	Status	Ref.
Gamma	September 28, 1867 – 1886	Virginia Military Institute	Lexington, Virginia	Merged (ΦΔΘ)	(Note: Chapter closed in 1886 following a ban on fraternities at VMI. Baird's Archive notes it merged into the Virginia Epsilon chapter of ΦΔΘ, which held out until 1889, also closing.)
Epsilon	1871–1886	Washington and Lee University	Lexington, Virginia	Merged (ΦΔΘ)	(Note: Became the Virginia Zeta chapter of Phi Delta Theta in 1886.)
Zeta	1874–1886	Virginia A&M College	Blacksburg, Virginia	Inactive	(Note: Chapter closed in 1886 following a ban on fraternities at Virginia A&M.) (Note: The Archive notes this chapter closed in 1880.)
Delta	1875–1884	University of Virginia	Charlottesville, Virginia	Inactive	
Eta	1881–1886	Emory and Henry College	Emory, Virginia	Inactive	
Upsilon	1881–1886	Randolph–Macon College	Ashland, Virginia	Merged (ΦΔΘ)	(Note: Merged with Virginia Gamma chapter of Phi Delta Theta in 1886.) (Note: A 1942 effort to restart ΚΣΚ's Upsilon chapter on the Randolph Macon campus failed a year later. Besides the University of Virginia, this was the only other school where ΚΣΚ had had a presence in both the first and second iterations.)
Nu	1882–1886	University of Richmond	Richmond, Virginia	Merged (ΦΔΘ)	(Note: Merged with Virginia Delta chapter of Phi Delta Theta in 1886.)
Rho	1883–1886	Bethel Military Academy	Warrenton, Virginia	Inactive	(Note: This school closed in 1911.)
Omega	1885–1886	University of North Carolina	Chapel Hill, North Carolina	Merged (ΦΔΘ)	(Note: Merged with (or possibly, became) the North Carolina Beta chapter of Phi Delta Theta in 1886. Baird's reports the Phi Delt chapter had formed only the year prior.)
Alpha	1885–1886	Louisiana State University	Baton Rouge, Louisiana	Withdrew (ΣΝ)	(Note: Charter was withdrawn in 1886. Became the Phi chapter of Sigma Nu in 1887.) (Note: This was the fourth oldest chapter to emerge on the campus. Phi Delt would appear some fifty years later, with no apparent connection to the earlier group.)

== Second incarnation (1935–1962) ==
=== History ===
Almost fifty years after the original fraternity had dissolved, a group of four students at the University of Virginia desired to form a new social fraternity in 1935. They were attracted to the Kappa Sigma Kappa badge, so they decided to revive the former fraternity as their own. After searching the University of Virginia archives, the students found the names of three members from the old Delta chapter who were still alive, including two charter members. They then discovered that one of the founders of the original fraternity, Kenneth McDonald, was still alive and living in San Francisco, California. The students made contact with McDonald, and he assisted them in redeveloping the fraternity and learning many of the original fraternity traditions. The second incarnation of Kappa Sigma Kappa was officially established in September 1935. Seven chapters of the new Kappa Sigma Kappa were established before World War II.

After the war, the fraternity emphasized expansion. New chapters were rapidly established, and members of the fraternity felt the need to become better organized on a national level. The fraternity held its first national convention in St. Louis, Missouri in 1948. National conventions continued to be held every year, but the fraternity still lacked a strong national organization. Although the fraternity had experienced great growth in the years after the war, Kappa Sigma Kappa found itself struggling by the early 1950s. It had allowed several chapters on campuses of unaccredited schools, and as a result, Kappa Sigma Kappa was unable to obtain membership in the National Interfraternity Conference (NIC). As a result of its lack of NIC membership, lack of uniform chapter operations, and lack of a strong national organization and central office, Kappa Sigma Kappa began rapidly losing its chapters in the 1950s as it began to affiliate with other NIC fraternities.

Kappa Sigma Kappa saw a merger with Theta Xi as its opportunity to repair its rapidly deteriorating situation. Following a series of meetings, the national organization of Kappa Sigma Kappa officially merged with Theta Xi on August 20, 1962. As a result of the merger, twenty-one chapters of Kappa Sigma Kappa located at accredited schools became chapters of Theta Xi. In addition, one further chapter of Kappa Sigma Kappa at Lawrence Technological University joined when the school was accredited. Each of the chapters was given a new Greek-letter chapter designation that was prefaced by the letter Kappa.

=== Merger symbolism ===
As part of the terms of the merger, the fraternity flower of Theta Xi was changed from the white carnation to the blue iris. The Theta Xi coat of arms was modified to replace its fleurs-de-lis with upright crescents, and the fraternity pledge manual title was changed from The Theta Xi Pledge Manual to The Quest For Theta Xi.

=== Chapters ===
Inactive chapters and institutions are noted in italics.

Chapter	Charter date and range	Institution	Location	Status	Ref.
Delta	1935–1939	University of Virginia	Charlottesville, Virginia	Inactive	
Pi	1935–1942	Lebanon Valley College	Annville, Pennsylvania	Withdrew (local)	(Note: Chapter closed in 1942 during WWII; after the war, it became a local fraternity known as Knights of the Valley.)
Pi (2)	1935–1939	Wofford College	Spartanburg, South Carolina	Withdrew (ΑΣΦ)	(Note: Originated as Phi Alpha Epsilon (local) in 1931. Chapter withdrew from ΚΣΚ in 1939 to become Alpha Beta Gamma (local), then joined Alpha Kappa Pi on May 18, 1940, becoming its Beta Phi chapter. This small national soon merged into Alpha Sigma Phi in 1946. The Wofford group kept that same designation going into ΑΣΦ, becoming its Beta Phi chapter.)
Beta	1937–1942	Western Reserve University	Cleveland, Ohio	Inactive	(Note: Originated as Alpha Gamma Epsilon (local) in 1934.)
Theta	1937–1942	Texas College of Mines	El Paso, Texas	Inactive	(Note: This chapter originated as the Exemplars Club (local) in 1928.)
Iota	September 5, 1939 – 1962	Youngstown State University	Youngstown, Ohio	Merged (ΘΞ)	(Note: Originated as Phi Kappa Delta (local) in 1935. Became the Kappa Alpha chapter of Theta Xi in 1962.)
Lambda	1941–1959	Waynesburg College	Waynesburg, Pennsylvania	Withdrew (ΘΧ)	(Note: This chapter had its origin in Theta Psi Omega (local), formed in 1912. It became the Delta chapter of small national Phi Lambda Theta in 1938. It then joined ΚΣΚ at the dissolution of that fraternity a few years later. In 1959 it withdrew from ΚΣΚ to become Kappa Phi Nu (local?), then joined ΘΧ.)
Mu	1941–1958	New Mexico Highlands University	Las Vegas, New Mexico	Inactive	
Nu	1941–1942	University of Illinois	Champaign, Illinois	Inactive	
Kappa	January 14, 1942 – 1962	Arkansas Agricultural and Mechanical College	Monticello, Arkansas	Merged (ΘΞ)	(Note: Became the Kappa Beta chapter of Theta Xi in 1962.)
Upsilon	1942–1943	Randolph–Macon College	Ashland, Virginia	Inactive	(Note: This chapter originated as a chapter of the Commons Club.)
Omicron	October 2, 1945 – 1962	Fairmont State College	Fairmont, West Virginia	Merged (ΘΞ)	(Note: Originated as Omicron Pi (local) in 1927. Became the Kappa Gamma chapter of Theta Xi in 1962.)
Rho	1946–19xx ?	University of Scranton	Scranton, Pennsylvania	Inactive	
Xi	May 1, 1946 – 1962	Concord College	Athens, West Virginia	Merged (ΘΞ)	(Note: Originated as Beta Sigma Mu (local) in 1932. Became the Kappa Epsilon chapter of Theta Xi in 1962.)
Phi Delta	1946–1962	Fort Hays Kansas State College	Hays, Kansas	Withdrew (ΑΚΛ)	(Note: Originated as Phi Delta Chi (local) in 1936. Named Phi Delta chapter of ΚΣΚ in recognition of previous local. Became the Alpha Delta chapter of Alpha Kappa Lambda in 1962.)
Sigma	April 30, 1946 – 1962	Indiana Institute of Technology	Fort Wayne, Indiana	Merged (ΘΞ)	(Note: Started as a colony of ΚΣΚ. Became the Kappa Delta chapter of Theta Xi in 1962.)
Tau	1946–1958	Eastern Illinois State College	Charleston, Illinois	Withdrew (ΠΚΑ)	(Note: Originated as Mu Gamma (local) in 1946. Withdrew from ΚΣΚ in 1958 to form Chi Nu, then became Zeta Gamma chapter of ΠΚΑ in 1964.)
Chi	1946–1958	Arizona State College	Flagstaff, Arizona	Inactive	
Florida Alpha	1946–1955	University of Tampa	Tampa, Florida	Withdrew (ΤΚΕ)	(Note: Originated as Alpha Sigma Delta (local) in 1946. Later, absorbed Tau Delta Sigma (local). Became the Epsilon Beta chapter of Tau Kappa Epsilon in 1955.)
Psi	1947–1962	Central Missouri State College	Warrensburg, Missouri	Withdrew (ΘΧ)	(Note: Originated as Beta Beta Beta (local) in 1945. Became the Epsilon Phi chapter of Theta Chi in 1962.)
Michigan Alpha	1947–19xx ?	Detroit Institute of Technology	Detroit, Michigan	Inactive	
West Virginia Gamma	April 16, 1947 – 1962	Morris Harvey College	Charleston, West Virginia	Merged (ΘΞ)	(Note: Became the Kappa Zeta chapter of Theta Xi in 1962.)
West Virginia Delta	April 28, 1947 – 1962	Glenville State College	Glenville, West Virginia	Merged (ΘΞ)	(Note: Became the Kappa Eta chapter of Theta Xi in 1962.)
Illinois Gamma	June 10, 1947 – 1962	Western Illinois University	Macomb, Illinois	Merged (ΘΞ)	(Note: Became the Kappa Theta chapter of Theta Xi in 1962.)
Indiana Beta	December 18, 1947 – 1962	Ball State College	Muncie, Indiana	Merged (ΘΞ)	(Note: Originated as Phi Beta Omicron (local) earlier in 1947. Became the Kappa Kappa chapter of Theta Xi in 1962.)
Maryland Alpha	1947–1974	University of Baltimore	Baltimore, Maryland	Withdrew (ΚΣΚ revival)	(Note: Chapter possibly started in 1948. It merged into Maryland Alpha-Kappa chapter with an unnamed chapter at Baltimore College of Commerce - Kappa, somehow, as the merged name became MD Alpha-Kappa?. Chapter was not eligible for the 1962 merger with Theta Xi; it became part of the third Kappa Sigma Kappa organization.)
British Alpha	1947–1951	Northern Polytechnic Institute	London, England	Inactive	
New Zealand Alpha	1947–1951	University of Canterbury	Christchurch, New Zealand	Inactive	
Tasmania Alpha	1947–1951	University of Hobart	Hobart, Tasmania	Inactive	
California Alpha	1947–1952	Sacramento State College	Sacramento, California	Withdrew (ΑΣΦ)	(Note: Withdrew to become Kappa Sigma Phi (local). Later, in 1961, merged into Alpha Sigma Phi.)
Arkansas Beta	November 19, 1947 – 1962	Henderson State Teachers College	Arkadelphia, Arkansas	Merged (ΘΞ)	(Note: Originated as Kappa Beta (local) earlier in 1947. Became the Kappa Iota chapter of Theta Xi in 1962.)
Canadian Alpha	1948–1960	University of Manitoba	Winnipeg, Manitoba	Inactive	
Michigan Beta	1948–1962	Lawrence Institute of Technology	Southfield, Michigan	Merged (ΘΞ)	(Note: Continued as local group until October 5, 1968, when it was chartered as Kappa Chi chapter of Theta Xi.)
Ohio Delta	1948–1954	University of Toledo	Toledo, Ohio	Inactive	
Georgia Alpha	1948–19xx	Georgia State University	Atlanta, Georgia	Inactive	
Iowa Alpha	1948–19xx	Upper Iowa University	Fayette, Iowa	Inactive	
Ohio Epsilon	May 22, 1948 – 1955	Cedarville College	Cedarville, Ohio	Inactive	
California Beta	1948–19xx ?	Stanford University	Stanford, California	Inactive	
California Beta	1948–19xx ?	Sacromento Junior College	Sacromento, California	Inactive	
California Gamma	1948–1961	Armstrong College	Berkeley, California	Inactive	(Note: Armstrong College was a business school that closed in approximately ~1990.)
California Delta	1948–1951	San Jose State College	San Jose, California	Withdrew (ΣΦΕ)	(Note: Withdrew to form Kappa Tau (local) in 1951. Became the CA Epsilon chapter of ΣΦΕ in 1958.)
Lambda Mu	1948–19xx	Washington State University	Pullman, Washington	Inactive	
Illinois Delta	1948–19xx ?	Eureka College	Eureka, Illinois	Inactive	(Note: Originated as Psi Alpha Lambda (local) in 1920.)
New York Alpha	1948–1959	University of Buffalo	Buffalo, New York	Inactive	(Note: Chapter was lost when the SUNY schools were forced to go local.)
Illinois Epsilon	1949–1977	Chicago Technical College (Note: The Chicago Technical College ceased operations in 1977.)	Chicago, Illinois	Withdrew (ΚΣΚ revival)	(Note: Unable to merge, as the school was a community college or unaccredited.)
Virginia Beta ?	March 3, 1949 – 1962	Old Dominion University	Richmond, Virginia	Merged (ΘΞ)	(Note: Became the Kappa Lambda chapter of Theta Xi in 1962.)
New York Beta	March 30, 1949–1962	Rochester Institute of Technology	Rochester, New York	Merged (ΘΞ)	(Note: Became the Kappa Mu chapter of Theta Xi in 1962.)
Michigan Gamma	1949–1954	Western Michigan University	Kalamazoo, Michigan	Withdrew (ΔΥ)	(Note: Originated as Zeta Delta Epsilon (local) in 1941. Reverted to its local name in 1954, then became the Western Michigan chapter of ΔΥ in 1956.)
Ohio Zeta	November 2, 1949–1962	Defiance College	Defiance, Ohio	Merged (ΘΞ)	(Note: Originated as Delta Sigma Kappa (local) in 1915. Became the Kappa Nu chapter of Theta Xi in 1962.)
Michigan Delta	November 19, 1949–1962	University of Detroit	Detroit, Michigan	Merged (ΘΞ)	(Note: Became the Kappa Xi chapter of Theta Xi in 1962.)
Pennsylvania Gamma	1949–1961	Widener University (Note: Widner University was known as Pennsylvania Military College until 1972.)	Chester, Pennsylvania	Inactive	
California Iota	March 17, 1950–19xx ?	University of California, Berkeley	Berkeley, California	Inactive	
California Zeta ?	1950 ?–19xx ?	University of California, Los Angeles	Los Angeles, California	Inactive	
Illinois Zeta	1950–19xx ?, 1974–19xx ?	Quincy College	Quincy, Illinois	Inactive	(Note: Originated as Delta Chi Delta (local) in 1947.)
New York Gamma	1950–1975	Erie County Technical Institute	Buffalo, New York	Withdrew (ΚΣΚ revival)	
North Carolina Alpha	September 25, 1950 – 1962	Lenoir-Rhyne University	Hickory, North Carolina	Merged (ΘΞ)	(Note: Became the Kappa Omicron chapter of Theta Xi in 1962.)
Missouri Beta	1950–1954	Saint Louis University	St. Louis, Missouri	Withdrew (ΔΣΦ)	(Note: Originated as a colony earlier in 1950. Revived the Phi chapter of ΔΣΦ after withdrawing from ΚΣΚ in 1954.)
Michigan Epsilon	April 6, 1951 – 1962	Wayne State University	Detroit, Michigan	Merged (ΘΞ)	(Note: Became the Kappa Pi chapter of Theta Xi in 1962.)
Virginia Alpha	1951–19xx ?	College of William & Mary	Williamsburg, Virginia	Inactive	
Michigan Zeta	1951–1962	Hillsdale College	Hillsdale, Michigan	Withdrew (ΤΚΕ)	(Note: Became a local fraternity at the time of the 1962 Theta Xi merger, then the Iota Nu chapter of ΤΚΕ in 1963.)
Michigan Eta	May 15, 1951 – 1962	Ferris State University	Big Rapids, Michigan	Merged (ΘΞ)	(Note: Became the Kappa Rho chapter of Theta Xi in 1962.)
Indiana Gamma	1952–1962, 1962–1966	Trine University (Note: Trine University was known as Tri-State University until 2008.)	Angola, Indiana	Withdrew (ΚΣΚ revival), Withdrew (ΚΣ)	(Note: This chapter originated as the Alpha chapter of Sigma Mu Sigma, a small fraternity that disbanded as a national entity in 1934 during the Great Depression, with most chapters joining ΤΚΕ. The Tri-State group did not follow its other chapters at that time. Instead, it merged into Alpha Lambda Tau in 1936. It later attempted to participate in that group's merger into Tau Kappa Epsilon in 1947 and was granted a charter, but was disallowed by NIC rules due to lack of school accreditation. (The campus ΤΚΕ chapter maintains this date for its origination, even though that later-formed group had a break in lineage.) Hence the Tri-State group continued as Tau Kappa Lambda (local) [This was possibly Tau Kappa Sigma (local), due to a typo] from 1949 to 1952. In 1952 the Tri-State chapter joined ΚΣΚ. Eight years later that fraternity sought a national merger into ΘΞ. The same accreditation situation forced the Tri-State group to again leave, continuing as one of several fractured "locals" of the third iteration of ΚΣΚ. No ΘΞ chapter name was issued for the Trine group. But four years later, in 1966 once school accreditation was secured, the Tri-State chapter became the Theta-Xi chapter of Kappa Sigma. It appears merely coincidental that this chapter took on a chapter name (Theta-Xi) that matches the eventual merger partner (ΘΞ) chosen by its former national fraternity, Kappa Sigma Kappa (that is, the second iteration). Note too, that a later re-establishment of ΣΜΣ at Tri-State, sponsored by an alumnus, would eventually merge into Acacia.)
New York Delta	1952–1956	Russell Sage College	Troy, New York	Inactive	
New York Epsilon	1953–November 1954	Alfred State College	Alfred, New York	Withdrew (local)	(Note: Originated as Alpha Tau (local) in 1949. Chapter disaffiliated with Kappa Sigma Kappa in November 1954 to became Kappa Sigma Epsilon (local) due to the forced localization of SUNY campuses.)
Michigan Gamma (2)	July 10, 1954 – 1962	Kettering University	Flint, Michigan	Merged (ΘΞ)	(Note: Originated as a club, The Society for the Preservation and Prevention from Extinction of Cocoa Drinkers in America, in 1953. Became Chi Sigma Alpha (local) in July 1954. Became the Kappa Sigma chapter of Theta Xi in 1962.)
Rhode Island Alpha	1954–1960	University of Rhode Island College of Pharmacy	Providence, Rhode Island	Inactive	(Note: The Archive places the start of this chapter in 1954 at the Pharmacy School at URI, while an earlier version of this page had it chartered in 1958. If its origin was at the pharmacy school it is reasonable to assume it moved to the main university. No specific reason for its closure is given in this reference, except "abolition" is noted.)
West Virginia Eta	December 2, 1955 – 1963	West Virginia Wesleyan College	Buckhannon, West Virginia	Merged (ΘΞ)	(Note: Became the Kappa Tau chapter of Theta Xi in 1963.)
New York Zeta	April 21, 1956 – 1962	Utica College	Utica, New York	Merged (ΘΞ)	(Note: Became the Kappa Upsilon chapter of Theta Xi in 1962.)
Illinois Eta	1956–1961	Northern Illinois University	DeKalb, Illinois	Inactive	(Note: Originated as Delta Phi Zeta (local) in 1954.)
North Carolina Beta	April 12, 1958 – 1962	Western Carolina University	Cullowhee, North Carolina	Merged (ΘΞ)	(Note: Became the Kappa Phi chapter of Theta Xi in 1962.)
New York Eta	1958–1967	Westchester Community College	Valhalla, New York	Withdrew (ΚΣΚ revival)	
New York Theta	1958–19xx ?	Hudson Valley Community College	Troy, New York	Withdrew (ΚΣΚ revival)	

Several chapters were noted by the Archive as forming post-merger with the support of the remaining chapters of ΚΣΚ. This was the "third iteration" of the fraternity. These are listed separately, below.

== Third incarnation (1962–1992) ==
Seven active chapters of the former Kappa Sigma Kappa fraternity were not accepted by Theta Xi in the 1962 merger because they were located at unaccredited schools. Although their national organization had merged and was now a part of Theta Xi, these seven chapters formed a new national structure and continued to use the Kappa Sigma Kappa name. In turn, they began approving new chapters of Kappa Sigma Kappa on more campuses, often at community colleges. During the late 1970s, the national organization dissolved but the Pennsylvania Alpha chapter remained active until 1992.

=== Chapters ===
Chapters held over into the third iteration of the Kappa Sigma Kappa or created after the merger, include the following. Inactive institutions and chapters are in italics.

Chapter	Date	College or University	Location	Status	Notes
Maryland Alpha	1948–1978 ?	University of Baltimore	Baltimore, Maryland	Inactive	(Note: The Baltimore College of Commerce merged with the University of Baltimore chapter in 1974, closing soon thereafter.) (Note: This chapter had formed with the second iteration of the fraternity and continued independently after the 1962 Theta Xi merger. It joined with others to re-establish Kappa Sigma Kappa for its third iteration.)
Illinois Epsilon	1949–1977	Chicago Technical College	Chicago, Illinois	Inactive	
New York Gamma	1950–1975	Erie County Technical Institute	Buffalo, New York	Inactive	
Illinois Zeta ?	1950–19xx ?, 1974–19xx ?	Quincy College	Quincy, Illinois	Inactive	(Note: Originated as Delta Chi Delta (local) in 1947.)
Indiana Gamma	1952–1966	Tri-State University (now Trine University)	Angola, Indiana	Withdrew (ΚΣ)	(Note: Became a chapter of Kappa Sigma in 1966.)
New York Eta	1958–1967	Westchester Community College	Valhalla, New York	Inactive	
New York Theta	1958–19xx ?	Hudson Valley Community College	Troy, New York	Inactive	
New Jersey Alpha	1962–197x ?	Mercer County Community College	Trenton, New Jersey	Inactive	
Pennsylvania Alpha	1966–1992	Spring Garden College	Philadelphia, Pennsylvania	Inactive	(Note: School closed in 1992.)
Missouri Alpha	1966–197x ?	Finlay Engineering College	Kansas City, Missouri	Inactive	(Note: Finlay College ceased operations in the latter 20th Century. A business registration for the school was maintained until 2001.)
Texas Alpha	1968–197x ?	University of Corpus Christi	Corpus Christi, Texas	Inactive	
Maryland Beta	196x–1974	Baltimore College of Commerce	Baltimore, Maryland	Consolidated (MD Alpha chapter)	
New York Kappa Colony	1994–197x ?	State University of New York, Brockport	Brockport, New York	Inactive	

There may have been up to 30 chapters in this third iteration of the fraternity. While not listed in Baird's Archive (as of July 2022), the Quincy College Gyrfalcon yearbook of 1974 notes re-establishment of ΚΣΚ on that campus that year, occurring post-merger as part of the third iteration of the fraternity. That same reference notes there being 30 chapters of the fraternity at that time. Thus some chapters may be missing from this third chapter list.

== See also ==
- Phi Delta Theta
- Theta Xi
