= List of Acacia chapters =

Acacia is a social fraternity founded in 1904 at the University of Michigan in Ann Arbor, Michigan. It has undergraduate (collegiate) and graduate chapters.

== Undergraduate chapters ==
Active chapters are indicated in bold. Inactive chapters are indicated in italic. Acacia has both colonies and associate chapters.

Number	Chapter	Former chapter name	Charter date and range	Institution	Location	Status	Ref.
1	Michigan	Aleph	May 12, 1904–1970; 1981–1991	University of Michigan	Ann Arbor, MI	Inactive	(Note: Reformed as a colony in 1979.)
2	Stanford	Beth	November 12, 1904–1916	Stanford University	Stanford, CA	Inactive	
3	Kansas	Gimel	November 14, 1904–1942, 1947–1992	University of Kansas	Lawrence, KS	Inactive	
4	**Nebraska**	Daleth	February 14, 1905–1929; 1933–1942; 1949	University of Nebraska–Lincoln	Lincoln, NE	Active	(Note: Reformed in 1933 from Delta Phi Gamma, established in 1929. Reformed as a colony in 1948.)
5	**California**	He	April 15, 1905–1970; 1980–2018; 2019	University of California, Berkeley	Berkeley, CA	Active	(Note: Created from Square & Compass, established in 1905. Reformed as a colony in 1979 and 2019.)
6	**Columbus**	Waw	March 25, 1906–1977; 1984	Ohio State University	Columbus, OH	Active	(Note: Formed from the Masonic Club, established 1902. Reformed as a colony in 1982.)
7	Dartmouth	Zayin	March 31, 1906–1908	Dartmouth College	Hanover, NH	Inactive	
8	**Illinois**	Heth	April 13, 1906	University of Illinois Urbana-Champaign	Urbana and Champaign, IL	Active	(Note: Formed from Pythagoras, established 1906.)
9	Harvard	Teth	April 13, 1906–1934	Harvard University	Cambridge, MA	Inactive	
10	Franklin	Yodh	May 3, 1906–1966; April 15, 1989–200x ?	University of Pennsylvania	Philadelphia, PA	Inactive	(Note: Reformed as a colony in 1986.)
11	Minnesota	Kaph	May 22, 1906–1993	University of Minnesota	Minneapolis and Saint Paul, MN	Inactive	(Note: Formed from a chapter of the Acacia Club, established 1904. Reformed as a colony in 1979.)
12	**Wisconsin**	Lamedth	May 22, 1906–1966; February 6, 1988	University of Wisconsin–Madison	Madison WI	Active	(Note: Formed from a chapter of the Masonic Club, established in 1906. Reformed as a colony in 1947 and 1986.)
13	**Missouri Colony**	Mem	May 17, 1907–1943; 1951–1967; 1980–1984; April 9, 2005 – 2021	University of Missouri	Columbia, MO	Active	(Note: Reformed as a colony in 1950, 1979, and 2003.)
14	**Cornell**	Nun	May 30, 1907	Cornell University	Ithaca, NY	Active	(Note: Formed from a chapter of the Masonic Club, established in 1907.)
15	**Purdue**	Samehk	October 11, 1907	Purdue University	West Lafayette, IN	Active	(Note: Formed from a chapter of the Masonic Club, established in 1901.)
16	Chicago	Ayin	December 5, 1908–1932	University of Chicago	Chicago, IL	Inactive	
17	Yale	Pe	January 15, 1909–1928	Yale University	New Haven, CT	Inactive	(Note: Formed from a chapter of the Acacia Club, established in 1907.)
18	Columbia	Tsadhe	March 20, 1909–1933	Columbia University	New York City, NY	Inactive	
19	Iowa State	Koph	March 20, 1909–1989; October 20, 2001–2024	Iowa State University	Ames, IA	Inactive	(Note: Formed from the Craftsman Club, established in 1908.)
20	**Iowa**	Resh	April 17, 1909–1933; 1951–1989; 2001–2005; 2015	University of Iowa	Iowa City, IA	Active	(Note: Reformed as a colony in 1949 and 1999.)
21	**Penn State**	Shin	June 9, 1909	Pennsylvania State University	University Park, PA	Active	(Note: Formed from a chapter of Square & Compass, established in 1908.)
22	Oregon	Tav	June 9, 1909 – 1913	University of Oregon	Eugene, OR	Inactive	
24	Northwestern	Aleph-Beth	March 5, 1910–1913; 1921–1990	Northwestern University	Evanston, IL	Inactive	
25	**Colorado**	Aleph-Gimel	January 27, 1911–1970; May 5, 1990–2000; August 7, 2010	University of Colorado Boulder	Boulder, CO	Active	
23	**Washington Colony**	Aleph-Aleph	February 5, 1911–1971; 1985–1990; 2014	University of Washington	Seattle, WA	Active	(Note: Reformed as a colony.)
26	Syracuse	Aleph-Daleth	June 10, 1911–1940; 1946–1985; August 12, 2006 – 2018	Syracuse University	Syracuse, NY	Inactive	
27	**Kansas State**	Aleph-He	December 6, 1913	Kansas State University	Manhattan, KS	Active	
28	**Texas Associate**		April 6, 1916–1933; 1947–1989; 1994–2000; May 6, 2006	University of Texas at Austin	Austin, TX	Active	
29	Oklahoma		May 1, 1920–1971; 1987–1989	University of Oklahoma	Norman, OK	Inactive	
30	**Indiana Colony**		May 22, 1920–2012; 2016–2021	Indiana University Bloomington	Bloomington, IN	Active	
31	George Washington		April 2, 1923–1960	George Washington University	Washington, D.C.	Inactive	
32	**North Carolina-Chapel Hill Colony**		April 4, 1923–1932; 2020	University of North Carolina at Chapel Hill	Chapel Hill, NC	Active	(Note: Reformed as a colony in 2020.)
33	Oklahoma State		May 12, 1923–1942; 1946–1988	Oklahoma State University–Stillwater	Stillwater, OK	Inactive	
34	Carnegie		May 12, 1923–1930	Carnegie Mellon University	Pittsburgh, PA	Inactive	
35	**Oregon State**		April 19, 1924–1931; 1949	Oregon State University	Corvallis, OR	Active	
36	Denver		May 12, 1925–1930; 1948–1958	University of Denver	Denver, CO	Inactive	
37	Cincinnati		May 12, 1929–1971	University of Cincinnati	Cincinnati, OH	Inactive	
38	**Washington State**		December 7, 1935–1996; January 14, 2012	Washington State University	Pullman, WA	Active	
39	Southern California		March 8, 1947–1961	University of Southern California	Los Angeles, CA	Inactive	(Note: Formed as a colony 1947.)
40	**Wyoming Colony**		April 19, 1947–1997	University of Wyoming	Laramie, WY	Active	
41	UCLA		November 27, 1948–1971; 1979–1983	University of California, Los Angeles	Los Angeles, CA	Inactive	(Note: Formed as a colony 1947. Reformed as a colony in 1977.)
42	**Ohio**		February 13, 1949–1970; 1989	Ohio University	Athens, OH	Active	
43	Miami of Ohio		May 22, 1949–1976; 1986–2012	Miami University	Oxford, OH	Inactive	
44	**Rensselaer**		April 10, 1949	Rensselaer Polytechnic Institute	Troy, NY	Active	
45	New Hampshire		December 3, 1949–1980; October 9, 1982 – 1997	University of New Hampshire	Durham, NH	Inactive	
46	Colorado State		April 30, 1950–1972	Colorado State University	Fort Collins, CO	Inactive	(Note: Formed as a colony 1949.)
47	Evansville		May 14, 1950–1958	University of Evansville	Evansville, IN	Inactive	
48	Vermont Colony		December 9, 1950–1998	University of Vermont	Burlington, VT	Inactive	(Note: Formed as a colony 1950.)
49	Arizona		December 17, 1950–1971	University of Arizona	Tucson, AZ	Inactive	(Note: Formed as a colony 1949.)
50	Arkansas		April 14, 1951–1973	University of Arkansas	Fayetteville, AR	Inactive	
51	Long Beach		September 10, 1955–1994	California State University, Long Beach	Long Beach, CA	Inactive	(Note: Formed as a colony 1954.)
52	**Louisiana State**		February 11, 1956–2015; 2020	Louisiana State University	Baton Rouge, LA	Active	(Note: Formed as a colony 1954. Reformed as a colony in 2018.)
53	Northern Colorado		March 18, 1956–1974	University of Northern Colorado	Greeley, CO	Inactive	(Note: Formed as a colony 1953.)
54	**Illinois Wesleyan Colony**		March 18, 1956–1985; May 4, 1991–xxxx ?	Illinois Wesleyan University	Bloomington, IL	Active	(Note: Formed as a colony 1956. Reformed as a colony in 1988.)
55	Central Missouri State		December 8, 1957–1971	University of Central Missouri	Warrensburg, MO	Inactive	(Note: Formed as a colony 1956.)
56	Rolla		November 16, 1958–2003	Missouri University of Science and Technology	Rollo, MO	Inactive	(Note: Formed as a colony 1958.)
57	Mississippi State		February 18, 1961–1980	Mississippi State University	Starkville, MS	Inactive	(Note: Formed as a colony 1960.)
58	Luther A. Smith		March 5, 1961, 1961–1967	University of Southern Mississippi	Hattiesburg, MS	Inactive	(Note: Formed as a colony 1960.)
59	Memphis		April 28, 1962–1971	University of Memphis	Memphis, TN	Inactive	(Note: Formed as a colony 1961.)
60	Boston University		May 5, 1962–1971	Boston University	Boston, MA	Inactive	
61	Central Oklahoma		April 25, 1964–1983; 1993–2021	University of Central Oklahoma	Edmond, OK	Inactive	
62	Shippensburg		April 17, 1966–2006	Shippensburg University of Pennsylvania	Shippensburg, PA	Inactive	
63	San Jose		April 24, 1966–1971	San Jose State University	San Jose, CA	Inactive	
64	Alabama		May 1, 1966–1970	University of Alabama	Tuscaloosa, AL	Inactive	
65	Georgia		May 15, 1966–1971; 1988–1989	University of Georgia	Athens, GA	Inactive	
66	Tennessee		November 20, 1966–1993	University of Tennessee	Knoxville, TN	Inactive	
67	**Trine**		January 29, 1967–1979; September 28, 2013	Trine University	Angola, IN	Active	(Note: Formed from the second Alpha chapter of a small national fraternity which it established, Sigma Mu Sigma.) (Note: This chapter was formerly called Tri-State.)
68	Houston		February 23, 1969–1971	University of Houston	Houston, TX	Inactive	
69	Northeast Louisiana		April 20, 1969–1981	University of Louisiana at Monroe	Monroe, LA	Inactive	
70	East Texas State		May 29, 1970–1976	East Texas A&M University	Commerce, TX	Inactive	(Note: Texas A&M University at Commerce changed its name to East Texas A&M University on 7 November 2024.)
71	Emporia		May 29, 1970–1976	Emporia State University	Emporia, KA	Inactive	
72	Kearney		April 9, 1972–1974	University of Nebraska at Kearney	Kearney, NE	Inactive	
73	**Illinois State (Normal)**		April 16, 1972–1978; July 31, 2014	Illinois State University	Normal, IL	Active	
74	Eastern Illinois		April 30, 1972–1977	Eastern Illinois University	Charleston, IL	Inactive	
75	Northeastern University		April 29, 1973–1989	Northeastern State University	Tahlequah, OK	Inactive	
76	Johnstown		December 2, 1973–2016	University of Pittsburgh at Johnstown	Johnstown, PA	Inactive	
77	Upper Iowa		April 28, 1974–1984	Upper Iowa University	Fayette, IA	Inactive	
78	Stephen F. Austin		April 27, 1975–1976	Stephen F. Austin State University	Nacogdoches, TX	Inactive	
79	Nebraska Omaha		January 22, 1977–1979	University of Nebraska at Omaha	Omaha, NE	Inactive	
80	**St. Cloud State**		March 13, 1977	St. Cloud State University	St. Cloud, MN	Active	
81	Cal Poly Pomona		December 12, 1981–1995	California State Polytechnic University, Pomona	Pomona, CA	Inactive	
82	Western Ontario		November 23, 1985–2000; 2006–2007	University of Western Ontario	London, ON	Inactive	
83	**California (PA)**		April 7, 1990	California University of Pennsylvania	California, PA	Active	
84	**Millersville**		April 23, 1988	Millersville University of Pennsylvania	Millersville, PA	Active	
85	**Carleton**		February 11, 1989	Carleton University	Ottawa, ON	Active	
86	Central Florida		March 26, 1994–2000	University of Central Florida	Orlando, FL	Inactive	
87	Johns Hopkins		March 9, 1994–1997	Johns Hopkins University	Baltimore, MD	Inactive	
88	Bloomsburg		April 24, 1998–2020	Bloomsburg University of Pennsylvania	Bloomsburg, PA	Inactive	
89	**Indiana (PA)**		April 12, 1996	Indiana University of Pennsylvania	Indiana County, PA	Active	
90	Morningside		April 24, 1997–2020	Morningside University	Sioux City, IA	Inactive	
91	Penn State/Altoona		April 25, 1998–2013	Penn State Altoona	Logan Township, PA	Inactive	
92	Northwestern Oklahoma State		November 13, 2004–2011	Northwestern Oklahoma State University	Alva, OK	Inactive	(Note: Formed as a colony 2002.)
93	Louisiana Tech		August 5, 2010–2014	Louisiana Tech University	Ruston, LA	Inactive	(Note: Formed as a colony 2007.)
94	Arizona State		November 3, 2017–2005	Arizona State University	Tempe, AZ	Inactive	(Note: Formed as a colony 2016.)
901	East Stroudsburg Colony		1997–	East Stroudsburg University of Pennsylvania	East Stroudsburg, PA	Inactive	
902	Angelo State Colony			Angelo State University	San Angelo, TX	Inactive	
903	Lock Haven Colony			Lock Haven University of Pennsylvania	Lock Haven, PA	Inactive	
904	North Dakota Colony			University of North Dakota	Grand Forks, ND	Inactive	
905	Nicholls State Colony			Nicholls State University	Thibodaux, LA	Inactive	
906	Grand Valley State Colony			Grand Valley State University	Allendale, MI	Inactive	
907	Texas A&M Colony			Texas A&M University	College Station, TX	Inactive	
908	Toronto Colony			University of Toronto	Toronto, ON	Inactive	
909	Texas Tech Colony		2010–2014	Texas Tech University	Lubbock, TX	Inactive	
95	**James Madison Colony**		2019	James Madison University	Harrisonburg, VA	Active	
	**Auburn Associate**		2020	Auburn University	Auburn, AL	Active	
	**Nevada Las Vegas Associate**			University of Nevada, Las Vegas	Las Vegas, NV	Active	
	**North Carolina - Wilmington Colony**			University of North Carolina Wilmington	Wilmington, NC	Active	

== Graduate chapters ==
Acacia has several alumni regional chapters.

Chapter	Date Established	Location	Ref.
Arizona	2017	Phoenix Area	
Indiana	2017	Indianapolis Area	
Massachusetts	2017	Boston Area	
New York	2017	New York City Area	
