= Square and Compass (fraternity) =

American collegiate fraternity (1897–1952)

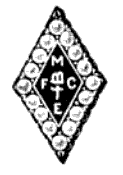
- Square and Compass badge
- Founded: May 12, 1917; 109 years ago Washington and Lee University
- Type: Social
- Affiliation: Independent
- Status: Merged
- Merge date: August 3, 1952
- Successor: Sigma Mu Sigma–Square and Compass
- Emphasis: Freemasonry
- Scope: National
- Colors: Navy blue and Silver gray
- Flower: White rose
- Publication: The College Mason
- Chapters: 57
- Members: 4,500+ lifetime
- Other names: Square and Compass–Sigma Alpha Chi; Sigma Alpha Chi
- Headquarters: United States

Square and Compass, also called Square and Compass–Sigma Alpha Chi, was an American collegiate social fraternity associated with Freemasonry. It was established at Washington and Lee University in Lexington, Virginia in 1917. In 1952, Square and Compass merged with Sigma Mu Sigma (ΣΜΣ), originally another Masonic fraternity, resulting in a new organization called Sigma Mu Sigma–Square and Compass.

== History ==
Square and Compass originated at Washington and Lee University in 1897 as a local club of Master Masons called The Masonic Club. Its founders were:

- Ells McDonald Bristow
- Fred M. Davis
- Thomas J. Farrar
- Carl A. Foss
- Edgar F. Grossman
- George T. Hollbrook
- Malcolm L. McCrae
- Lacy L. Shirey
- W. Bruce Trigg

All of the founders were students except Farrar who was a faculty member of the college.

In 1916, its members were interested in affiliating with an intercollegiate Greek-letter organization, specifically Acacia which was the only national Masonic fraternity at the time. However, this was not possible because many of club's members already had fraternity affiliations. Instead, the club adopted the name Square and Compass in 1916, forming a fraternity that could accept members of other Greek letter organizations. It was incorporated in the Commonwealth of Virginia on May 12, 1917; members considered this event to be their formal founding. The new fraternity had plans to expand to other colleges.

However, any expansion plans were put on hold on the eve of World War I when the fraternity's two leaders left immediately to enter the Reserve Officers' Training Corps on May 14, 1917. Before the end of the 1917 college year, all of Square and Compass's founders were either in the United States Army or the United States Navy. The fraternity went inactive.

In the fall of 1919, Carl A. Foss, the fraternity's secretary, returned to Washington and Lee. Foss reorganized Square and Compass with the help of Thomas J. Farrar and others. By 1927, the fraternity had initiated 3,504 and had chartered 55 chapters, with 50 being active. It had chapter houses at Alabama Polytechnic Institute, Drake University, Howard College, Louisiana State University, Tulane University, the University of Arizona, the University of Pittsburgh, and the University of Wisconsin.

Although the Great Depression led to a decline in the fraternity's vitality, by the beginning of World War II, it had initiated nearly 4,500 members and had expanded to 57 chapters. Rising tensions before the war precipitated the loss of chapters. Square and Compass were inactive for the duration of the war, opening once again for both Masons and sons of Masons.

Some members lobbied for the adoption of Greek letters to appeal to new members. These pressures prompted Square and Compass to adopt the name of Sigma Alpha Chi in 1950; the organization became Square and Compass–Sigma Alpha Chi.

Two years later, on August 3, 1952, Square and Compass voted to merge with Sigma Mu Sigma, another national Masonic fraternity that was originally known as Square Men's Society. The merged organization became known officially as Sigma Mu Sigma–Square and Compass. The merger linked four Sigma Alpha Chi chapters with Sigma Mu Sigma and to another period of moderate growth. The other Square and Compass chapters dissipated.

== Symbols ==
The name Square and Compass was chosen because square and compasses, more correctly a square and a set of compasses joined, is the single most identifiable symbol of Freemasonry. The Square and Compass badge was diamond-shaped with the letters M, F, C & E at the four corners and two secret characters in the center. Its pledge button was a circle divided by the letter S in navy blue and silver gray. The fraternity's colors were navy blue and silver gray. Its flower was the white rose.

Square and Compass referred to its chapters as squares. Its publication was The College Mason.

== Membership ==
Square and Compass adopted the Masonic model where interested candidates applied for membership, rather than opting for a typical Greek letter organization bidding process. Any active Mason in good-standing was automatically accepted as a member. Faculty advisors were considered equal members to the students and could hold offices. The fraternity also conveyed honorary memberships to Master Masons. Its honorary members included university presidents and Grand Master Masons of several American grand lodges.

== Governance ==
Square and Compass was governed by national officers who met at biennial convention. The national officers included a representative from each chapter. Between conventions, executive and legislative power was given to its general consul that included five national officers and five national deputes who were elected to represent the fraternity's five provinces.

== Chapters ==
Square and Compass referred to its chapters as squares and named them based on the institution where it was established. The squares of Square and Compass through 1929 were:

Charter date and range	Institution	Location	Status	Ref.
May 12, 1917	Washington and Lee University	Lexington, Virginia	Inactive	(Note: Chapter started in 1897 as The Masonic Club, a local campus group for Master Masons.)
1920	Tulane University	New Orleans, Louisiana	Inactive	
1920	Colgate University	Hamilton, New York	Inactive	
1920	Louisiana State University	Baton Rouge, Louisiana	Inactive	
1921	University of Arkansas	Fayetteville, Arkansas	Inactive	
1921	North Carolina State College of Agriculture and Engineering	Raleigh, North Carolina	Inactive	
1921	Howard College	Big Spring, Texas	Inactive	
1921	St. Lawrence University	Canton, New York	Inactive	
1921	Columbia University	New York City, New York	Inactive	
1921	Alabama Polytechnic Institute	Auburn, Alabama	Inactive	
1921–1924	Emory University	Atlanta, Georgia	Inactive	
1921	Missouri School of Mines and Metallurgy	Rolla, Missouri	Inactive	
1921–1924	Vanderbilt University	Nashville, Tennessee	Inactive	
1922 – August 3, 1952	Medical College of Virginia	Richmond, Virginia	Merged (ΣΜΣ)	(Note: Became the Kappa chapter of Sigma Mu Sigma in 1952 with the national merger of the two fraternities.)
1922	University of Idaho	Moscow, Idaho	Inactive	
1922–1924	Millsaps College	Jackson, Mississippi	Inactive	
1922	Washington & Jefferson College	Washington, Pennsylvania	Inactive	
1922	Brown University	Providence, Rhode Island.	Inactive	
1922	Thomas S. Clarkson Memorial College of Technology	Potsdam, New York	Inactive	
1922–1926	University of Illinois	Champaign, Illinois	Withdrew (ΣΜΣ)	(Note: Chapter withdrew and became the Eta chapter of Sigma Mu Sigma.)
1922	State College of Washington	Pullman, Washington	Inactive	
1922	University of Wisconsin	Madison, Wisconsin	Inactive	
1923	University of Oklahoma	Norman, Oklahoma	Inactive	
1923	Clark University	Worcester, Massachusetts	Inactive	
1923–1929	Des Moines University	West Des Moines, Iowa	Inactive	
1923	Rensselaer Polytechnic Institute	Troy, New York	Inactive	
1923	Georgia Tech	Atlanta, Georgia	Inactive	
1923	Birmingham–Southern College	Birmingham, Alabama	Inactive	
1923	Wabash College	Crawfordsville, Indiana	Inactive	
1923	West Virginia University	Morgantown, West Virginia	Inactive	
1923	Montana College of Agriculture and Mechanic Arts	Bozeman, Montana	Inactive	
1923	Medical College of the University of Arkansas	Little Rock, Arkansas	Inactive	
1923	Municipal University of Akron	Akron, Ohio	Inactive	
1923 – August 3, 1952	Miami University	Oxford, Ohio	Merged (ΣΜΣ)	(Note: Became the Nu chapter of Sigma Mu Sigma with the national merger of the two fraternities.)
1923–1926	Stout Institute	Menomonie, Wisconsin	Inactive	
1924	Lehigh University	Bethlehem, Pennsylvania	Inactive	
1924	Brooklyn Law School	New York City, New York	Inactive	
1924	Ohio University	Athens, Ohio	Inactive	
1924	George Washington University	Washington, D.C.	Inactive	
1924	University of Utah	Salt Lake City, Utah	Inactive	
1924	University of Georgia	Athens, Georgia	Inactive	
1924	University of North Dakota	Grand Forks, North Dakota	Inactive	
1924	Washington University in St. Louis	St. Louis, Missouri	Inactive	
1924	University of Pittsburgh	Pittsburgh, Pennsylvania	Inactive	
1924	University of Washington	Seattle, Washington	Inactive	
1924	Colorado School of Mines	Golden, Colorado	Inactive	
1925	Syracuse University	Syracuse, New York	Inactive	
1925	University of Arizona	Tucson, Arizona	Inactive	
1925	University of Kentucky	Lexington, Kentucky	Inactive	
1926	University of Southern California	Los Angeles, California	Inactive	
1926	Marshall College	Huntington, West Virginia	Inactive	
1926	Medical College of the University of Tennessee	Memphis, Tennessee	Inactive	
1926	University of Nevada	Reno, Nevada	Inactive	
1926	Drake University	Des Moines, Iowa	Inactive	
1927	College of William & Mary	Williamsburg, Virginia	Inactive	
1928	Kirksville College of Osteopathy and Surgery	Kirksville, Missouri	Inactive	
19xx ? – August 3, 1952	Elon College	Elon, North Carolina	Merged (ΣΜΣ)	(Note: Became the Lambda chapter of Sigma Mu Sigma with the national merger of the two fraternities.)
19xx ?	Lafayette College	Easton, Pennsylvania	Inactive	
19xx ? – August 3, 1952	Salmon P. Chase College of Law	Highland Heights, Kentucky	Merged (ΣΜΣ)	(Note: Became the Mu chapter of Sigma Mu Sigma with the national merger of the two fraternities.)

== Notable members ==
- Frank Reed Horton (Lafayette) educator and the founder of Alpha Phi Omega
- William E. Warner (Wisconsin), industrial arts professor
