= Square and Compasses =

Symbol of Freemasonry

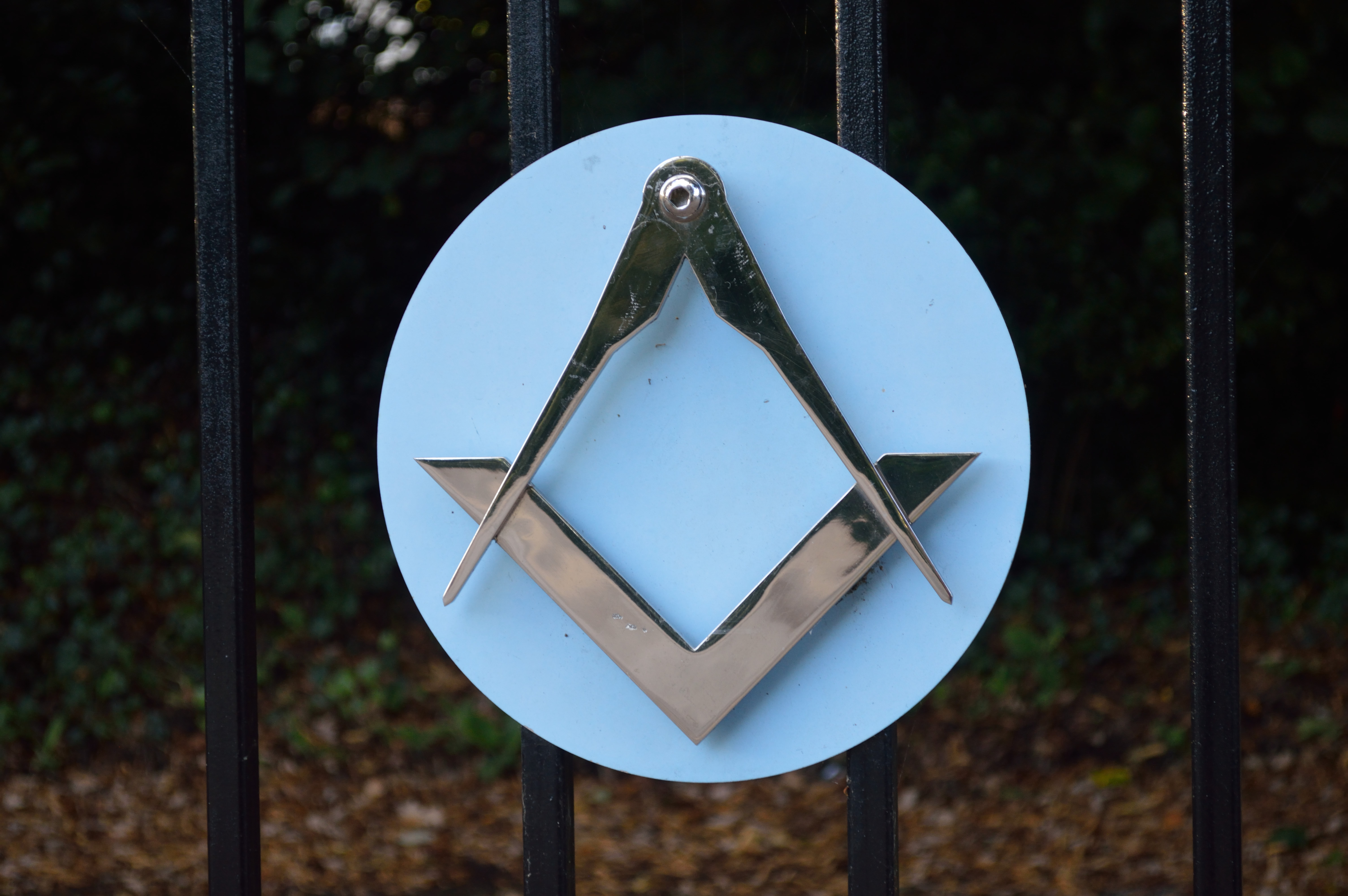
Square and Compasses sign on the gates of Freemasons' Hall, Bournemouth, England

The Square and Compasses (or, more correctly, a square and a set of compasses joined) is the single most identifiable symbol of Freemasonry. Both the square and compasses are architect's tools and are used in Masonic ritual as emblems to teach symbolic lessons.

Some Lodges and rituals explain these symbols as lessons in conduct: for example, Duncan's Masonic Monitor of 1866 explains them as: "The square, to square our actions; The compasses, to circumscribe and keep us within bounds with all mankind". However, as Freemasonry is non-dogmatic, there is no general interpretation for these symbols (or any Masonic symbol) that is used by Freemasonry as a whole.

The name Square and Compass was used by two national college fraternities that were created by Master Masons, specifically Square and Compass and a group later called Sigma Mu Sigma.

== With a "G" ==
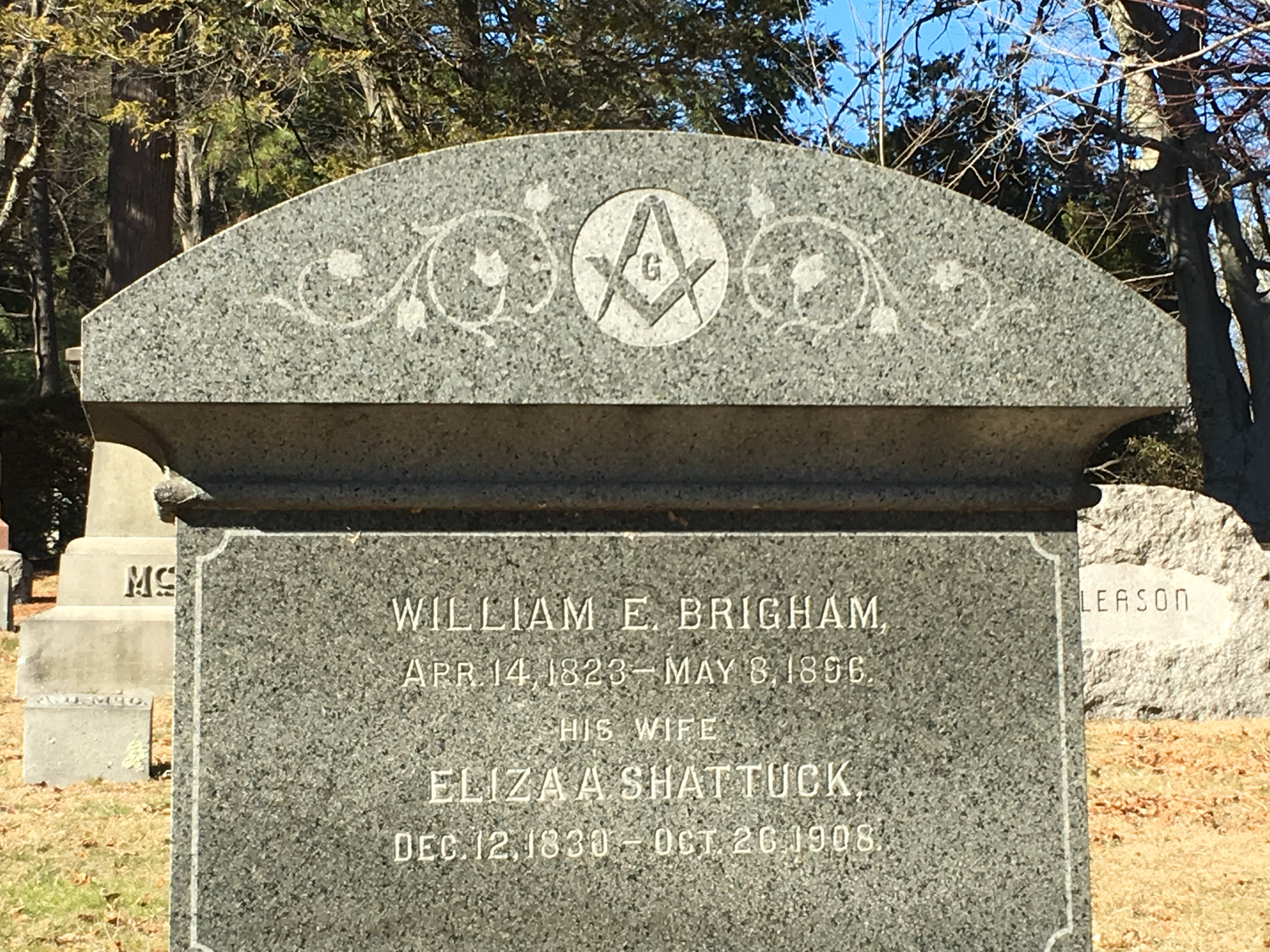
Free Mason Stone, Forest Hills Cemetery in Jamaica Plain

In many English speaking countries, the Square and Compasses are depicted with the letter "G" in the center. The letter has multiple meanings, representing different words depending on the context in which it is discussed. The most common is that the "G" stands for God. Another is that it stands for Geometry, and is to remind Masons that Geometry and Freemasonry are synonymous terms described as being the "noblest of sciences", and "the basis upon which the superstructure of Freemasonry and everything in existence in the entire universe is erected. In this context, it can also stand for Great Architect of the Universe (a non-denominational reference to God)."

== Use of the symbol by other fraternal bodies ==
Vector image rendering showing both points of the compasses elevated above the square

The square and compasses have been used as a symbol by several organizations, sometimes with additional symbols:

- The Order of Free Gardeners, which adds an open pruning knife within the square and compasses
- The Junior Order of United American Mechanics, which adds an arm-and-hammer within the square and compasses.
- The Independent United Order of Mechanics, which retains the symbol unchanged.
- The Royal Black Institution, which uses the symbol unchanged.
- Carpenters' Company of the City and County of Philadelphia uses the square and three sets of compasses in its arms. The Philadelphia arms are similar to the City of London Livery Company, the Worshipful Company of Carpenters
- The Incorporation of Wrights and Masons – Edinburgh Trades. The Wrights' symbol is the square and compasses in a different configuration from the traditional Masonic one. Wright is the Scottish and Northern English term for a Carpenter.
- The arms of the former Allan Glen's School, still used by the school club and independent rugby club, incorporate a square and compasses in a similar configuration to the Edinburgh Wrights. Allan Glen was a wright by trade and the school's arms are similar to those formerly used by the Incorporation of Wrights of Glasgow.
- Iglesia ni Cristo, one of several revolutionary churches established during the colonial period in the Philippines, appears to have the same Masonic compasses over a triangle, identical to that of the Allied Masonic Degrees.
