= Beta Phi Theta =

American collegiate fraternity (1917–1948)

- ΒΦΘ
- Founded: October 1917; 108 years ago Milwaukee State Normal School
- Type: Social
- Affiliation: Independent
- Status: Defunct
- Defunct date: 1969
- Successor: Scattered
- Scope: Regional
- Member badge
- Colors: Green and White
- Symbol: Rampant lion, key, balance scale
- Flower: Daisy
- Publication: The Helmet
- Chapters: 7 installed; 4 active chapters at dissolution
- Headquarters: Milwaukee, Wisconsin; United States

Beta Phi Delta (ΒΦΘ) was a three-state regional American fraternity, established in 1917. It ceased operations in 1948 with four remaining chapters. Of these, three merged into other national fraternities.

== History ==
Beta Phi Delta was founded at Milwaukee State Normal School (now the University of Wisconsin–Milwaukee) in October 1917. It was an outgrowth of friendships that were developed among students in the Student Army Training Corps at the normal school during World War I. Its founders were William Armstrong, Roderick Bott, Sidney Foster, Harold Morgan, Milton Murray, and Winston Reineking.

By 1930, it had expanded to three chapters and around 200 members. The fraternity eventually chartered seven chapters, all in the Midwest states of Wisconsin, Indiana and Illinois. It was governed by an national executive board that was based in Milwaukee. It also had a supreme high council that meet during the fraternity's annual convention.

A merger with similarly sized Alpha Delta Alpha was discussed in the 1930s, but was not consummated. Beta Phi Theta national was dissolved in 1948, with four chapters remaining active at as local fraternities. The University of Wisconsin–Milwaukee chapter operated as a local fraternity for a decade, before becoming a chapter of Tau Kappa Epsilon in 1958. Within a year of dissolution of Beta Phi Theta, its Bradley University chapter became a chapter of Theta Xi. The Tri-State chapter held on until 1969 as Beta Phi Theta (local), when it became a chapter of Delta Chi.

== Symbols ==
The badge of Beta Phi Theta was an eight-sided shield, the major sides of which curved inward. On a field of black enamel were displayed the Greek letters ΒΦΘ, ordered vertically, in gold. This field was surrounded by pearls.

The fraternity also had a pledge pin that was green oval with a gold bar, crossed at an angle. Its colors were green and white. Its flower was the daisy. Its publication was The Helmet.

== Chapters ==
Following are the chapters of Beta Phi Theta, with inactive chapters listed in italics.

Chapter	Charter date and range	Institution	Location	Status	Ref.
Alpha	October 1917 – January 11, 1958	University of Wisconsin–Milwaukee	Milwaukee, Wisconsin	Withdrew (local, then ΤΚΕ)	(Note: Chapter formed at the Milwaukee State Normal School, which became the University of Wisconsin–Milwaukee in 1956. After the dissolution of the national fraternity, it operated as a local chapter. On January 11, 1958, it became the Zeta Zeta chapter of Tau Kappa Epsilon.)
Beta	1925–1931	Marquette University	Milwaukee, Wisconsin	Inactive	(Note: Chapter formed from the Hilltop Club, established in 1923.)
Gamma	1925–1930	University of Wisconsin–Madison	Madison, Wisconsin	Inactive	(Note: Chapter formed from Alpha Theta, established in 1924.)
Delta (Omicron Epsilon)	1926–1948	Bradley University	Peoria, Illinois	Withdrew (ΘΞ)	(Note: Chapter formed from Omicron Sigma (local), established in 1924. As a result, the chapter was called Omicron Sigma, rather than Delta. Upon dissolution of the national fraternity, it became the Alpha Sigma chapter of Theta Xi in 1948.)
Epsilon	1929–1969	Trine University	Angola, Indiana	Withdrew, (local, then ΔΧ)	(Note: This chapter originated as the Four-Eleven Gang (local) in 1922, taking the Greek letter name Lambda Phi Epsilon in 1927. Upon dissolution of the national fraternity, it reverted to local status. In 1969, it became a chapter of Delta Chi.)
Zeta	1930–1932	University of Illinois	Champaign and Urbana, Illinois	Inactive	(Note: Chapter formed from Beta Chi, established in 1928.)
Theta	1948–1948	University of Wisconsin-Racine	Somers, Wisconsin	Inactive	
