= Phi Lambda Theta =

Defunct American collegiate fraternity

- ΦΛΘ
- Founded: November 18, 1920; 105 years ago Pennsylvania State University
- Type: Social
- Former affiliation: NIC
- Status: Defunct
- Defunct date: 1984
- Emphasis: Odd Fellows
- Scope: National
- Member badge
- Colors: Purple, Gold, and Gray
- Flower: Yellow chrysanthemum
- Publication: Star and Balance
- Chapters: 5
- Headquarters: United States

Phi Lambda Theta (ΦΛΘ) was a social fraternity founded at Pennsylvania State College (now Pennsylvania State University) in 1920 for students who belonged to the Independent Order of Odd Fellows. It was originally named Three Links.

== History ==
Phi Lambda Theta originated as the Three Links in 1920, at Pennsylvania State College in State College, Pennsylvania. It was organized by J. Clifford Jenkins and Charles W. Reed to unite students who belonged to the Independent Order of Odd Fellows. The group's first meeting after being recognized by the college's board of fraternal affairs was on November 18, 1920, the date the fraternity designated as its Founders' Day.

The fraternity changed its name from Three Links to Phi Lambda Theta on May 11, 1922. Phi Lambda Theta ended its affiliation with the Odd Fellows in January 1924, following changes to the requirements for non-collegiate lodges on September 13, 1922.

A second chapter, Beta, was established at Kansas State University in 1923, followed by Gamma at Bucknell University in 1925. Delta was chartered at Waynesburg University in 1927, followed by Epsilon at Susquehanna University in 1928. In 1930, Phi Lambda Theta was admitted to junior membership in the North American Interfraternity Conference. That year, it had initiated 400 members and three chapters owned houses. The fraternity also had an alumni association.

Phi Lambda Theta was governed by an annual national convention that elected five grand officers and a board of trustees. Each chapter sent two representatives to the convention, along with one delegate from the alumni association. Its executive committee oversaw operations between national conventions, and included the grand president, the grand vice president, and the grand secretary-treasurer.

Rather than a coordinated merger strategy, the dissolution of Phi Lambda Theta appears to have been a sudden rush for the door, late in the Great Depression. The Kansas State and Susquehanna chapters became chapters of Beta Kappa in 1938 through separate petitions, and the founding chapter was absorbed into Alpha Tau Omega.

Shortly after these departures, the chapter at Bucknell became a local under that name. In 1984, it joined Chi Phi as the Phi Lambda Theta chapter, a nod to its former national name. Meanwhile, the Waynesburg chapter opted for Kappa Sigma Kappa, its home for eighteen years; The chapter would later withdraw from that fraternity and merge into Theta Chi. Thus eventually, three of Phi Lambda Theta's five chapters were absorbed by Theta Chi, through later mergers.

== Symbols ==
The Phi Lambda Theta badge was diamond-shaped, with a black enamel center that featured the Greek letters ΦΛΘ, with a pearl above and below. Its pledge button was the shield of Penn State in blue and white.

The fraternity's colors were purple, gold, and grey. Its flag had a purple field, a grey border, and the Greek letters ΦΛΘ in gold. Its flower was the yellow chrysanthemum. Its publication was Star and Balance, first published in 1926.

== Chapters ==
Phi Lambda Theta had five chapters. All were active at dissolution.

Chapter	Charter date and range	Institution	Location	Status	Ref.
Alpha	November 18, 1920 – 1938	Pennsylvania State University	University Park, Pennsylvania	Merged (ΑΤΩ)	(Note: Chapter formed from the Three Links Club, established in 1920. In 1938, it joined the Gamma Omega chapter of Alpha Tau Omega)
Beta	April 29, 1923 – 1938	Kansas State University	Manhattan, Kansas	Merged (ΒΚ)	(Note: Chapter formed from the Topeka Club (local), established in 1921. In 1938, it merged with Beta Kappa, becoming the Alpha Chi chapter.)
Gamma	1925–1940, 1948–1984	Bucknell University	Lewisburg, Pennsylvania	Merged (ΧΦ)	(Note: Chapter formed from a Commons Clubs chapter, established in 1924. After the fraternity's dissolution, it continued to operate as a local fraternity with the same name for two years before going dormant. It was revived in 1948 and joined Chi Phi in 1984.)
Delta	1927–1941	Waynesburg University	Waynesburg, Pennsylvania	Merged (ΚΣΚ)	(Note: Chapter formed from Theta Psi Omega (local), established in 1912. Later, it became the Lambda chapter of Kappa Sigma Kappa. After eighteen years in ΚΣΚ, it withdrew as a local named Kappa Phi Nu. In 1959, it joined Theta Chi as its Eta Omicron chapter)
Epsilon	1928–1938	Susquehanna University	Selinsgrove, Pennsylvania	Merged (ΒΚ)	(Note: Chapter formed from Phi Beta Rho (local), established in 1923. In 1938, it merged with Beta Kappa, becoming the Alpha Omega chapter.)

== See also ==
- List of social fraternities
