= Frank Reed Horton =

American educator and fraternity founder (1896–1966)

- Born: July 17, 1896; Sewickley, Pennsylvania, U.S.
- Died: August 28, 1966 (aged 70); Easton, Pennsylvania, U.S.
- Education: Worcester Academy; Boston University School of Law; Lafayette College (AB, MA); La Salle Extension University (LLB)
- Occupation: Educator
- Known for: Founder and first national president of Alpha Phi Omega

Frank Reed Horton (July 17, 1896 – August 28, 1966) was an American educator. He is best known as the founder and first national president of Alpha Phi Omega, an international service fraternity.

== Early life and education ==
Horton was born July 17, 1896, in Sewickley, Pennsylvania. He attended Worcester Academy in Worcester, Massachusetts, where he graduated in 1914.

In 1915, after leaving Worcester Academy, he worked during the day as a law clerk and at night studied law extension courses from La Salle Extension College. In Fall of 1916, Horton enrolled in Boston University in 1917, where he became a brother of Sigma Alpha Epsilon.

== Military ==
In June Horton joined the U.S. Navy in 1918, commissioned an ensign in 1919. As an ensign, he served on the minesweeper USS Whippoorwill (AM-35) shortly after World War I and received the World War I Victory Medal with Minesweeper Clasp.

== Continuing education after WWI ==
After the war, Horton finished his associate degree in law from Boston University. He later received a A.B. and M.A. degrees in history from Lafayette College in Easton, Pennsylvania, in 1926 and 1938, respectively. In 1937, he was awarded an L.L.B. degree from La Salle Extension University in Chicago.

== Fraternities ==
Horton was the founder and first national president (1926–1931) of Alpha Phi Omega, which grew to eighteen campuses and established its first national structure under his leadership.

As a student at Lafayette College in Easton, Pennsylvania, Horton was also a member of Sigma Alpha Epsilon social fraternity, Kappa Phi Kappa, and the Square and Compass, a Freemasonry college group.

=== Awards ===
His fraternity leadership won him several awards, including:

- Numerous Alpha Phi Omega honors and awards

The National Distinguished Service Key

- The naming of the 1966 national fall pledge class in his honor.

Among fraternity members, he is sometimes referred to as "The Lightbearer" since he was the principal founder of Alpha Phi Omega.

Horton was heavily involved in Scouts and other community organizations, holding the following role:

- Deputy Scout Commissioner, Easton Scout Council, PA, 1923
- Scout Executive, Homestead District Council, PA, 1927–28
- Scout Executive, Shenandoah Area Council, Winchester, Virginia, 1929-1931
- Member, Freemasonry, 1918; Royal Arch/York Rite, 1919; Scottish Rite
- Member, Kiwanis (joined between 1920–22)
- Member, Knights of Pythias (joined between 1920–22)

== Death ==
Horton died August 28, 1966 in Easton, Pennsylvania, at age 70. Resting place is in Washington Cemetery in Washington, NJ with his wife, Helen.
