= Sigma Mu Sigma =

American college fraternity (1921–2020)

- ΣΜΣ
- Founded: March 25, 1921; 105 years ago; reestablished 1984; Trine University (Tri-State)
- Type: Service
- Affiliation: Independent
- Former affiliation: NIC
- Status: Defunct
- Defunct date: 2020
- Successor: Tau Kappa Epsilon (1935); Sigma Alpha Chi (1952)
- Scope: National
- Colors: Azure and Gold
- Symbol: Lamp, All-Seeing Eye, open book, clasped hands
- Flower: Egyptian lotus
- Chapters: 22
- Members: 6,700 lifetime
- Headquarters: 3171 Colchester Brook Lane; Fairfax, Virginia 22031; United States

Sigma Mu Sigma (ΣΜΣ) is a former American college fraternity founded in 1921 at Trine University, formerly Tri-State University. Sigma Mu Sigma was historically an all-male social fraternity open originally to Master Masons, and later open to all undergraduate male students. As a national fraternity, Sigma Mu Sigma dissolved in 1935 when it was absorbed by Tau Kappa Epsilon. Sigma Mu Sigma was later revived, developed another dozen chapters, and several of these were absorbed by Kappa Sig, Acacia and others. A few remaining chapters of Sigma Mu Sigma transformed into a co-ed service fraternity in 1984 but went defunct around 2020.

== History ==
=== Early history ===
In 1921, Sigma Mu Sigma was founded by three Knights Templar students at Tri-State College in Angola, Indiana. The three founders were Claude Brown, Charles Knapp, and Harold Van Vranken. Sigma Mu Sigma was founded as a fraternity exclusively for Master Masons with a zeal for the promotion of the fraternity's cardinal principles of sincerity, morality, and scholarship. Its founding date was Good Friday, March 25, 1921.

At the time of the fraternity's founding, Tri-State College had a ban on secret societies; however, several sub-rosa organizations were known to exist on campus. The three founders of the fraternity selected nine other students who were also Master Masons and among the top students at the college. Sigma Mu Sigma announced its formation to administrators and professors of the college. Faced with the possibility of expelling twelve of the top students at Tri-State, the college moved to end its ban on fraternities.

The fraternity's original intent was to limit membership to Master Masons and to maintain the scholarship standards of Phi Beta Kappa. This was soon found to be impracticable and the Phi Beta Kappa standard was soon dropped. However, the fraternity did require a high scholarship record of its pledges.

Sigma Mu Sigma became a junior member of the North-American Interfraternity Conference (NIC) in 1928. In 1929, the fraternity's membership requirements were changed to allow both Masons and sons of Masons.

=== Merger with Tau Kappa Epsilon ===
In the early 1930s, the United States was in the midst of the Great Depression, resulting in college enrollment and fraternity membership dropping significantly. The effect was especially felt on Sigma Mu Sigma because of the added constraints of its Masonic membership requirement. In the fall of 1934, Sigma Mu Sigma national decided to dissolve itself and allow its chapters to be absorbed by Tau Kappa Epsilon. Sigma Mu Sigma had nine chapters at the time of the decision.

The merger was effected in March 1935 with the Epsilon chapter at George Washington University becoming the Alpha-Pi chapter of Tau Kappa Epsilon. Sigma Mu Sigma's Zeta chapter at Purdue University and the Eta chapter at the University of Illinois merged with existing Tau Kappa Epsilon chapters at their respective campuses. While these three chapters merged, the remaining chapters did not participate: Beta, Gamma, Delta, and Theta chapters dissolved. Alpha and Iota chapters chose to remain as independent, local Sigma Mu Sigma chapters without a national organization.

In 1936, Alpha chapter affiliated with Alpha Lambda Tau, signaling that for some reason, the 1935 merger with Tau Kappa Epsilon had been unworkable. Small nationals were merging or dissolving across the country during this difficult time, however, for the Tri-State chapter, the reason may have been that they were unwelcome. At this juncture, chapters at some schools were incompatible with the larger nationals because the NIC (as well as the NPC) required that Full member fraternities may only allow chapters at accredited institutions. Sigma Mu Sigma had been a junior member; Tau Kappa Epsilon was a full member. Hence, as Tri-State was not yet accredited, the chapter may have realized or been advised it was ineligible for a charter with Tau Kappa Epsilon. This may have been the reason it remained local, and then joined the smaller national fraternity of Alpha Lambda Tau, also a junior NIC member. The Iota chapter lingered for a few years, and was inactive by 1940.

=== Redevelopment ===
Clyde E. Shaw, a Sigma Mu Sigma brother and faculty member of the Tri-State chapter, revived the fraternity in 1940, four years after his original chapter had joined Alpha Lambda Tau as its Psi chapter. (To complete the story on the original chapter, Alpha Lambda Tau was a small national fraternity that in 1947 would later itself merge into Tau Kappa Epsilon as a coincidental, second national merger, that time bringing the Tri-State chapter along with it briefly; but within a year the Tri-State group, now called Beta-Epsilon chapter of Tau Kappa Epsilon was forced to return its newly won charter because of the accreditation problem. The resilient Tri-State group then joined Kappa Sigma Kappa, and was granted a charter from Kappa Sigma just after Tri-State earned accreditation. The chapter survives to the present day.)

Meanwhile, while Shaw's original chapter was proceeding through these several affiliations, his newly-re-established Alpha chapter of Sigma Mu Sigma was reborn through his efforts and able to successfully navigate the manpower drain of World War II, stabilizing into a thriving chapter as the only existent active group of his re-established fraternity. This chapter, now operating as a local fraternity with the name Sigma Mu Sigma, changed its membership requirements to allow non-Masons to join. Alpha chapter was the only active Sigma Mu Sigma chapter from 1940 to 1952.

=== Merger with Sigma Alpha Chi ===
In August 1952, the Alpha chapter merged with Sigma Alpha Chi, another Masonic fraternity that had been originally known as Square and Compass. Two years later, on August 3, 1952, Square and Compass and Sigma Mu Sigma voted to merge; the merged organization became known officially as Sigma Mu Sigma–Square and Compass. The merger linked Sigma Mu Sigma with four chapters from Sigma Alpha Chi and led to another period of moderate growth. The other Square and Compass chapters dissipated.

== Recent history ==
The merger with Sigma Alpha Chi put the fraternity on more solid footing during the 1950s and into the 1960s. This led to the establishment of eight additional chapters. Sigma Mu Sigma marketed itself as a service fraternity from this point, allowing participation by men already active in another social fraternity. However, anti-establishment attitudes on college campuses of the late 1960s began to put pressure on most college fraternities.

This was especially true for Sigma Mu Sigma, which had long been linked with socially conservative ideals and the Freemasons. As Baird's Manual explained, "The purpose of the fraternity is to foster the indoctrination of the college men of America with the traditions of their American heritage" By the early 1970s, this message wasn't as marketable as hoped. At this juncture, many of its chapters began to close or move to other nationals. The Alpha chapter at Tri-State joined Acacia, the largest of the Masonic-influenced fraternities. The Lambda chapter at Elon College joined Kappa Sigma. Other chapters would close, and the Sigma chapter was removed from campus by the administration of Lynchburg College.

=== Coed evolution ===
Under the pressure of these changes, the fraternity took on a new direction. When reestablished in 1984 with the assistance of the Tau chapter at Virginia Tech, the Sigma chapter at Lynchburg College became coed. Sigma Mu Sigma Fraternity remained focused on service, and it allowed both male students to be members as well as female students, known as sisters. Its national headquarters was based in Fairfax, Virginia.

The Sigma chapter was the only Sigma Mu Sigma chapter until 1989 when it began working to establish the Chi chapter at the College of William and Mary. Chi chapter was chartered in November 1990. Campus administration forced the Sigma chapter to become an all-male chapter in 1992. Mu, Omicron, Pi, and Tau were also reactivated in the 2000s. By 2016, the last active chapter, Sigma, had gone inactive.

== Symbols ==
The fraternity's colors were azure and gold. Its flower was the Egyptian lotus. Its symbols were the lamp, the all seeing eye, an open book, and clasped hands.

== Chapters ==
Following are the historic chapters of Sigma Mu Sigma. The original fraternity roll included chapters Alpha through Iota. It was re-established by Alpha (Second) which operated as a local under the Sigma Mu Sigma name for twelve years, until the addition of several Sigma Alpha Chi chapters and a second period of moderate growth that lasted until the national was dissipated in the mid-1960s, leaving several surviving locals. A third iteration of the fraternity with a co-ed model was attempted by the surviving Sigma chapter, now defunct.

Chapter	Charter date and range	Institution	Location	Status	Ref.
Alpha (Prime) (see Alpha Second)	March 25, 1921 – 1936	Tri-State University	Angola, Indiana	Withdrew (ΑΛΤ)	(Note: Alpha chapter was unable to merge with Tau Kappa Epsilon in 1935, likely due to lack of school accreditation, a requirement of the NIC for its full-member fraternities. Alpha chapter then affiliated with Alpha Lambda Tau in 1936 but twelve years later would finally become a chapter of Tau Kappa Epsilon, albeit briefly, in 1947 as a result of a merger between Alpha Lambda Tau and Teke. But the same lack of school accreditation ended this affiliation; the chapter would progress through several short-term non-NIC affiliations, finally becoming a chapter of Kappa Sigma in 1966 shortly after the school became accredited. Meanwhile, an alumnus would revive Sigma Mu Sigma on the Tri-State (Trine) campus, even as the original chapter was moving through its various affiliations. This second iteration of Alpha would eventually affiliate with Acacia in 1967.) (Note: The original Trine University chapter of Sigma Mu Sigma may arguably be the most prolific, or resilient chapter of any fraternity. This local chapter birthed three successor chapters on the Trine campus and a surviving, small national fraternity. It opened Trine (at the time Tri-State) to fraternal organizing, weathered a lack of school accreditation, and negotiated waves of merger talks during its hundred-year history.)
Beta	1924–1934	University of Oklahoma	Norman, Oklahoma	Inactive	(Note: Ceased operations at about the time of the 1935 ΤΚΕ merger.)
Gamma	1925–<1935	National University	Washington, D.C.	Inactive	
Delta	1925–1935	Milwaukee School of Engineering	Milwaukee, Wisconsin	Inactive	
Epsilon	June 1924–1934	George Washington University	Washington, D.C.	Merged (ΤΚΕ)	(Note: Merged with Tau Kappa Epsilon in 1935.)
Zeta	1925–1934	Purdue University	West Lafayette, Indiana	Merged (ΤΚΕ)	(Note: Merged with an existing Tau Kappa Epsilon chapter in 1935.)
Eta	1925–1935	University of Illinois	Urbana, Illinois	Merged (ΤΚΕ)	
Theta	1926–1934	Oklahoma State University	Stillwater, Oklahoma	Inactive	
Iota	February 22, 1926 – 1940	Michigan State Normal College	Ypsilanti, Michigan	Inactive	(Note: Lingered independently, but still recognized as a national fraternity by its campus, for four years after the ΤΚΕ merger in 1935. However, the chapter became inactive in 1940 with World War II.)
Alpha (Second) (see Alpha Prime)	February 16, 1940 – 1966	Tri-State University	Angola, Indiana	Withdrew (Acacia)	(Note: Withdrew to form Acacia chapter)
Kappa	August 3, 1952 – 19xx ?	Medical College of Virginia	Richmond, Virginia	Inactive	(Note: Originally a chapter of ΣΑΧ (Square and Compass).) (Note: Baird's has Virginia Medical chapter named Mu and does not list a Kappa chapter. Mu is assumed to be an error.)
Lambda	August 3, 1952 – June 1, 1972	Elon College	Elon, North Carolina	Withdrew (ΚΣ)	(Note: Lambda chapter did not merge with Sigma Alpha Chi. Instead, it became the Lambda Lambda chapter of Kappa Sigma in 1973.)
Mu	August 3, 1952 – 19xx ?, 20xx ?-201x ?	Chase College of Law	Highland Heights, Kentucky	Inactive	(Note: Baird's has the Chase chapter named Nu.)
Nu	1953–19xx ?	Miami University	Oxford, Ohio	Inactive	(Note: Baird's does not list a Miami University chapter.)
Xi	1953–19xx ?	Joliet Junior College	Joliet, Illinois	Inactive	
Omicron	1953–19xx ?, 20xx ?-201x ?	University of Louisville	Louisville, Kentucky	Inactive	
Pi	1955–19xx ?, 20xx ?-201x ?	New York University	New York City, New York	Inactive	
Rho	1955–19xx ?	Virginia Tech	Blacksburg, Virginia	Inactive	
Sigma	February 6, 1962 – 197x ?; 1984–20xx ?	University of Lynchburg	Lynchburg, Virginia	Inactive	(Note: Sigma chapter was kicked off campus in the later 1970s because of its increasingly social nature. With its 1984 re-establishment, ΣΜΣ became a co-ed service fraternity. However, the college the fraternity to return to a single-sex all-male fraternity in 1992.)
Tau	1965–19xx ?, 20xx ?-201x ?	Widener University	Chester, Pennsylvania	Inactive	(Note: Chaper was formed at Brandywine Junior College, which merged with Widener in 1976.)
Upsilon	1969–19xx ?	Salem College	Winston-Salem, North Carolina	Inactive	
Phi colony	1971–19xx ?	Virginia Commonwealth University	Richmond, Virginia	Inactive	(Note: The Phi colony was started and named but never chartered.)
Chi	November 3, 1990 – 202x ?	College of William & Mary	Williamsburg, Virginia	Inactive	(Note: Established as a coed chapter after Sigma chapter's revival of the fraternity as a co-ed service fraternity.)

== See also ==
- List of social fraternities
- List of Trine University fraternities and sororities
