= Finlay Engineering College =

Finlay Engineering College was a for-profit degree-granting technical college in Kansas City, Missouri, United States, teaching electrical, structural, and mechanical engineering, architecture, and structural and mechanical drafting from 1903 into the 1980s.

== History and operations ==
Created and presided over by Henry Finlay, the school operated out of 1001 Indiana Avenue, then by 1925, used the address 100 Finlay Building, and in 1956 took over the former John T. Hartman School at 7 East 79th Terrace, in the building now occupied by the Kansas City Academy.

Finlay advertised in Popular Mechanics magazine in the 1920s and 1930s.

After the college ceased operations, the company remained registered in Missouri until 2001.
