= Alpha Lambda Tau =

- ΑΛΤ
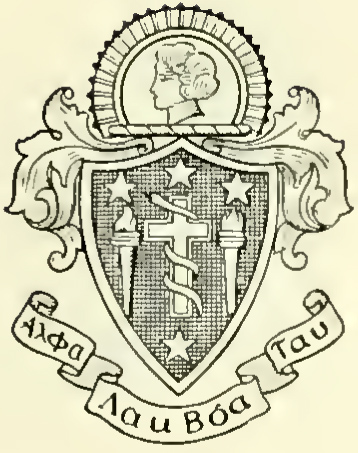
- Founded: March 27, 1921; 105 years ago Oglethorpe College
- Type: Social
- Former affiliation: NIC
- Status: Defunct
- Defunct date: Fall 1946
- Scope: National
- Colors: Old gold and Black
- Flower: American Beauty Rose
- Publication: The Rose Leaf
- Chapters: 23
- Headquarters: United States

Alpha Lambda Tau (ΑΛΤ) was an American men's college fraternity founded in 1916 at Oglethorpe College in Brookhaven, Georgia. For its first decade, Alpha Lambda Tau permitted expansion only within the Southern states. In 1946, the national organization of Alpha Lambda Tau dissolved; the majority of its chapters affiliated with Tau Kappa Epsilon.

== History ==
Alpha Lambda Tau originated as the Alpha Lambda Club at Oglethorpe College in Brookhaven, Georgia on October 8, 1916. In 1920, the group held its first biennial convention. In preparation of becoming a national fraternity, the club incorporated in the State of Georgia as Alpha Lambda Tau on March 27, 1921. Being of Southern origin, it was originally decided that the fraternity would not expand north of the Mason–Dixon line.

Alpha Lambda Tau grew by absorbing numerous local fraternities at Southern universities. Beta was established in 1922 at the Alabama Polytechnic Institute, followed by Gamma at Mercer University in 1923. The fraternity dropped its anti-northern expansion policy at the 1927 national convention and issued a charter to Lambda at the University of Illinois.

Alpha Lambda Tau became a junior member of the National Interfraternity Conference (NIC) in 1928. By 1930, it had initiated 1,250 members in had fifteen chapters. It also had alumni chapters in Chicago, Birmingham, and Atlanta.

In the fall of 1946, the national organization of Alpha Lambda Tau dissolved. Five of the eight chapters that were active in 1946 merged with Tau Kappa Epsilon. Several chapters went to other national fraternities. However, there was no official merger between Alpha Lambda Tau and another organization.

== Symbols ==
Alpha Lambda Tau's badge was round with four gold arms with the letter ALOT. Its center featured a black shield with a serpent, a cross, and two torches. There were three stars above the shield and one below it. Its pledge pin was a gold shield with a black enamel serpent and cross in the middle, with black panels on either side.

The fraternity's colors were old gold and black. Its flower was the American Beauty rose. Its publication was The Rose Leaf.

== Chapters ==
Following are the chapters of Alpha Lambda Tau.

Chapter	Charter date and range	Institution	Location	Status	Ref.
Alpha	March 27, 1921 – 1943	Oglethorpe College	Brookhaven, Georgia	Inactive	(Note: Chapter formed as the Alpha Lambda Club (local) in 1916, becoming Alpha Lambda Tau's Alpha chapter on March 27, 1921.)
Beta	1922–July 1947	Alabama Polytechnic Institute	Auburn, Alabama	Merged (ΤΚΕ)	(Note: Chapter formed from Omicron Tau Phi (local), established in 1920 at Polytechnic Institute, now Auburn University. It became the Beta-Lambda chapter of Tau Kappa Epsilon.)
Gamma	October 13, 1923 – 1947	Mercer University	Macon, Georgia	Merged (ΣΝ)	(Note: Chapter formed from Alpha Lambda (local), established in 1921. It withdrew and it revived the Eta chapter of Sigma Nu.)
Delta	May 31, 1925 – April 1947	Louisiana Tech University	Ruston, Louisiana	Merged (ΤΚΕ)	(Note: Chapter formed from Alpha Omega (local), established in 1898. It became the Beta-Zeta chapter of Tau Kappa Epsilon with the national merger of the two fraternities.)
Epsilon	1925–1930	University of North Carolina	Chapel Hill, North Carolina	Inactive	(Note: Chapter formed from Gamma Psi (local), established in 1824 (date most likely a typo for 1924 in the Almanac).)
Zeta	January 22, 1925 – January 1947	North Carolina State College of Agriculture and Engineering	Raleigh, North Carolina	Merged (ΤΚΕ)	(Note: Became the Beta-Beta chapter of Tau Kappa Epsilon with the national merger of the two fraternities.) (Note: North Carolina State College of Agriculture and Engineering is now North Carolina State University.)
Eta	April 15, 1926 – 1940	Howard College	Homewood, Alabama	Inactive	(Note: Chapter originated as Phi Beta Tau (local) in January 1925 at Howard College, now Samford University.)
Theta	1928–1942	University of Georgia	Athens, Georgia	Inactive	(Note: Chapter formed from Kappa Phi Alpha (local), established in 1928.)
Iota	1927–1947	Presbyterian College	Clinton, South Carolina	Merged (ΣΝ)	(Note: Chapter formed from the Rapier Club (local), established in 1926. After the national fraternity ceased operations, it operated as a local fraternity before becoming the Zeta-Theta chapter of Sigma Nu in January 1951.)
Kappa	January 14, 1928 – 1947	Wofford College	Spartanburg, South Carolina	Inactive	(Note: Chapter formed from Beta Phi (local), established in 1924.)
Lambda	1928–1932	University of Illinois	Champaign, Illinois	Inactive	(Note: Chapter formed from Phi Nu Beta (local), established in 1923.)
Mu	1928–1936	University of Arkansas	Fayetteville, Arkansas	Inactive	(Note: Chapter formed from the College Men Club (local), established before 1928.)
Nu	1929–1930	Lyon College	Batesville, Arkansas	Inactive	(Note: Chapter formed from Eta Beta Kappa, established in 1925.)
Xi	May 5, 1929 – 1947	University of Chattanooga	Chattanooga, Tennessee	Merged (ΠΚΑ)	(Note: Chapter formed from Phi Beta Gamma (local), established in 1921. At the time of the merger with Tau Kappa Epsilon, it withdrew and became the Delta Epsilon chapter of Pi Kappa Alpha.)
Omicron	1929–1941	Transylvania University	Lexington, Kentucky	Merged (ΔΣΦ)	(Note: Chapter formed from Alpha Gamma Chi (local), established in 1925. It withdrew and became the Beta Mu chapter of Delta Sigma Phi.)
Pi	1931–1938	University of Alabama	Tuscaloosa, Alabama	Inactive	
Rho	1931–1932	Culver–Stockton College	Canton, Missouri	Inactive	(Note: Chapter formed from Phi Beta Epsilon (local), established in 1926.)
Sigma	January 30, 1932 – 1935	University of Kentucky	Lexington, Kentucky	Inactive	(Note: Formed as Phi Psi Phi (local) on October 26, 1930 as a planned expansion into Alpha Lambda Tau.)
Tau	December 15, 1934 – February 1947	University of Maryland, College Park	College Park, Maryland	Merged (ΤΚΕ)	(Note: Chapter formed from Iota Nu Delta (local), established in 1914. It became the Beta-Delta chapter of Tau Kappa Epsilon.)
Upsilon	1934–193x ?	Michigan State University	East Lansing, Michigan	Inactive	
Phi	September 1935–1940	Missouri School of Mines and Metallurgy	Rolla, Missouri	Inactive	(Note: Chapter formed from the Bonanza Club (local), established in 1914.)
Chi ?	1936–1937	Western State College of Colorado	Gunnison, Colorado	Inactive	(Note: Chapter formed from Theta Tau Omega (local), established in 1925.)
Psi	June 7, 1936 – March 1947	Tri-State College	Angola, Indiana	Merged (ΤΚΕ)	(Note: Chapter formed from the Alpha chapter of Sigma Mu Sigma, established in 1921 at Tri-State University, now called Trine University.) (Note: After being granted the name Beta-Epsilon chapter of Tau Kappa Epsilon, ΤΚΕ was forced by NIC rules to revoke the chapter's charter because Tri-State was not (yet) accredited. The chapter affiliated with Kappa Sigma Kappa in 1952. In 1962 ΚΣΚ nationally merged with ΘΞ, but due to the accreditation issue, the chapter reverted to local status again, calling itself Tau Kappa Lambda (local). In 1966, once school accreditation was in place, it would become the Theta-Xi chapter of Kappa Sigma fraternity, with that new name a coincidence having no relation to the national fraternity into which its former national merged. To complete the historical record, ΤΚΕ's Beta-Epsilon chapter was recolonized in a separate effort on the Trine campus in 1989.)

== See also ==
- List of social fraternities
