= Alpha Delta Alpha =

Defunct American collegiate fraternity

- ΑΔΑ
- Founded: 1920; 106 years ago Coe College
- Type: Social
- Affiliation: Independent
- Status: Defunct
- Defunct date: December 1934
- Scope: Regional
- Colors: Red, White, and Purple
- Publication: The Cresset
- Chapters: 8
- Headquarters: Cedar Rapids, Iowa; United States

Alpha Delta Alpha (ΑΔΑ) was an American fraternity that was established in 1920 at Coe College in Cedar Rapids, Iowa. It expanded to eight chapters in Iowa and Indiana before ceasing operation as a national organization in December 1934. Six chapters continued as local organizations, with at least three of these eventually merging into other various national fraternities.

== History ==
Alpha Delta Alpha was founded at Coe College in Cedar Rapids, Iowa in 1920. Its founders were George A. Hunt, Harold R. Johnson, Carleton B. Sutliff, and Paul A. Young. The fraternity was established as a local scientific and radio society, emerging out of the Radio Club that was formed in 1910. Shortly thereafter, it became a national fraternity when it merged with a similar society at the University of Iowa in 1920.

By 1923 it had shifted focus to become a general social fraternity. It added six additional chapters at institutions in Iowa and Indiana. The fraternity was governed by its protus boule, elected at national meetings held semiannually. It was headquartered in Cedar Rapids.

A merger was discussed with Beta Phi Theta in the early 1930's but was not consummated. The fraternity was dissolved in December 1934, at a national meeting held in Cedar Falls, Iowa. However, several chapters continued as locals, sooner or later joining other national fraternities. The Eta chapter joined Alpha Kappa Pi, a national organization that later merged into Alpha Sigma Phi.

Gamma chapter at the University of Northern Iowa operated as a local fraternity according to campus yearbooks. Due to World War II enlistment, by 1944 all fraternity activity on the campus appears to have ceased; no fraternities are shown in the 1944 yearbook, while the sororities at Northern Iowa continued in operation. On that campus, other fraternities resumed in 1946, but these did not include Alpha Delta Alpha.

== Symbols ==
Alpha Delta Alpha's badge was a gold equilateral triangle, with one point down and a border of 21 pearls. Inside the triangle was a black enamel triangle with a single pearl, a radio antenna, and the Greek letters ΑΔΑ. Its pledge pin was a black triangle with a radio antenna and a white border.

The fraternity's colors were red, white, and purple. Its quarterly publication was The Cresset, first published in 1928.

== Chapters ==
Although Alpha Delta Alpha fraternity ceased operations in December 1934, many of its chapters opted to withdraw and continue as local fraternities. The following list of Alpha Delta Alpha chapters reflects local closure dates, rather than the ending of the national fraternity.

Chapter	Charter date and range	Institution	Location	Status	Ref.
Alpha	1920–1946	Coe College	Cedar Rapids, Iowa	Withdrew (local, then ΛΨΑ)	(Note: The Chapter originated from the Radio Club (local) formed on the Coe campus in 1910. After dissolution in December 1934, this chapter continued as a local, then became the Zeta–Alpha chapter of Lambda Chi Alpha in 1946.)
Beta	1921–1924	University of Iowa	Iowa City, Iowa	Inactive	(Note: This chapter appears to have fizzled by 1924, straddling the line between social and professional. Some members continued as Chi Delta Sigma (local, professional technology) per the 1925 yearbook, and a few years later, some ΧΔΣ members would join Theta Tau, but not all. This appears to have been a consolidation, as Theta Tau's Omicron chapter had already formed by 1923.)
Gamma	1923–1943	Iowa State Teachers College	Cedar Falls, Iowa	Withdrew (local)	
Delta	1926–1936	Buena Vista University	Storm Lake, Iowa	Withdrew (local)	
Epsilon	1927–1934	Simpson College	Indianola, Iowa	Inactive	(Note: This chapter originated as Gamma Kappa Delta (local) in 1925. It appears to have gone inactive at the time of national dissolution.)
Zeta	1928–1936	Hanover College	Hanover, Indiana	Withdrew (ΣΧ)	(Note: This chapter originated as Sigma Lambda Chi (local) in 1924. After dissolution, it revived the dormant Chi chapter of Sigma Chi in 1936.)
Eta	1930–1935	Tri-State College	Angola, Indiana	Withdrew (ΑΚΠ)	(Note: This chapter originated as Phi Lambda Tau (local) in 1924. After dissolution of the fraternity, it became the Alpha Beta chapter of Alpha Kappa Pi in 1935. In 1946, Alpha Kappa Pi merged into Alpha Sigma Phi and the chapter became the Beta Omicron chapter of that fraternity.)
Theta	1932–1947	Upper Iowa University	Fayette, Iowa	Withdrew (local)	(Note: This chapter originated as Delta Chi Upsilon (local) in 1908. It appears to have lingered for some years as a local fraternity after the national dissolution.)

== See also ==
- List of social fraternities
