= Chicago Technical College =

Abolished junior college in Chicago, Illinois

Coordinates: 41°51′19.1″N 87°37′27.7″W

Chicago Technical College (CTC) was a private junior college founded in 1904 in Chicago. CTC closed in 1977.

== Courses ==
As of 1925, CTC offered both day and night classes with Diplomas in Architecture, Civil, Mechanical and Electrical Engineering in two years and Bachelors after three years of day classes.

== Campuses ==
Locations included the original CTC home, the "Lake View" building at 116 S. Michigan Avenue. At some point before 1918 day classes were held in new Chicago “Tech” Building at 2721 S. Michigan Avenue.

By 1928, the school was in a new two-story building at the corner of 26th and Indiana Streets. Some time before 1950 CTC moved to a three-story building at 2000 South Michigan Avenue.
