= Tau Kappa Epsilon =

North American collegiate fraternity

- ΤΚΕ
- Founded: January 10, 1899; 127 years ago Illinois Wesleyan University
- Type: Social
- Affiliation: Independent
- Former affiliation: NIC
- Status: Active
- Scope: International
- Motto: "Better Men for a Better World"
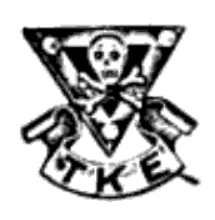
- Member badge
- Colors: Primary: Crimson Lake Cherry; Cool Gray; Supplementary: Black; White
- Symbol: Equilateral Triangle
- Flag
- Flower: Red carnation
- Patron Greek deity: Apollo
- Publication: The Teke
- Philanthropy: St. Jude Children's Research Hospital
- Chapters: 212 active
- Members: 10,590 active 301,000 lifetime
- Nicknames: ΤΚΕ, Teke
- Headquarters: 7439 Woodland Drive, Suite #100; Indianapolis, Indiana 46278; United States
- Website: tke.org

Tau Kappa Epsilon (ΤΚΕ), commonly known as ΤΚΕ or Teke, is a social college fraternity founded on January 10, 1899, at Illinois Wesleyan University. The organization has chapters throughout the United States and Canada, making the Fraternity an international organization. Since its founding in 1899, Tau Kappa Epsilon Fraternity has never had an exclusionary or discriminatory clause to prevent individuals from joining and has instead admitted members based on their "personal worth and character". As of spring 2024, there are 209 active ΤΚΕ chapters and colonies with over 301,000-lifetime members.

While Tau Kappa Epsilon is primarily mentioned as a collegiate fraternity, the organization emphasizes that it is a "Fraternity for Life". Many chapters have active alumni associations that support philanthropic causes, mentor collegiate members, and host social events. Famous Teke alumni that continued their involvement with the Fraternity include NFL quarterback Terry Bradshaw, country music singer Willie Nelson, and U.S. President Ronald Reagan.

== History ==
=== Founding ===
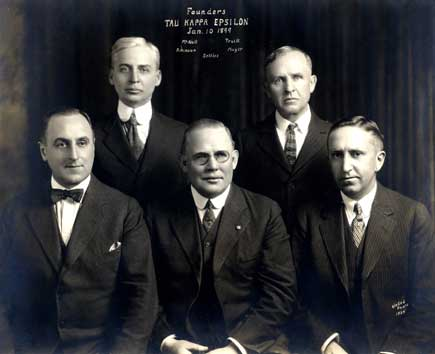
The five founders of Tau Kappa Epsilon. Clockwise from top left: James Carson McNutt, Owen Ison Truitt, Clarence Arthur Mayer, Joseph Lorenzo Settles, Charles Roy Atkinson

On January 10, 1899, Charles Roy Atkinson, Clarence Arthur Mayer, James Carson McNutt, Joseph Lorenzo Settles, and Owen Ison Truitt met at 504 East Locust Street in Bloomington, Illinois, to draw up the first constitution for a new fraternity at Illinois Wesleyan University. The purpose of the new organization was to be an "aid to college men in mental, moral and social development". The founders sought to be a different organization than the other fraternities at the time by establishing a fraternity where membership would be based on personal worth and character rather than wealth, rank, or honor. Mental development would be emphasized by the study of classic literature at weekly meetings, and thus the new fraternity became known as the Knights of Classic Lore. The first public announcement of the Knights of Classic Lore appeared in the February 1, 1899, issue of the Argus, which is the student publication of Illinois Wesleyan University.

During formation, the Knights of Classic Lore were trying to get the Illinois Epsilon chapter of Phi Delta Theta restored. Prominent Phi Delt alumnus Richard Henry Little became a persistent sponsor for the Knights to petition Phi Delta Theta for a charter. The Knights first petitioned Phi Delta Theta at its 1902 convention in New York, but efforts were unsuccessful. After renting rooms at several locations beginning in the spring of 1899, the Knights of Classic Lore finally acquired its first fraternity house, known as The Wilder Mansion, in September 1902. Simultaneously with the acquisition of the new house, the Knights also adopted the name Tau Kappa Epsilon. The name change was expected to create a better impression in future petitions to Phi Delta Theta. The second petition was presented at the Indianapolis convention of 1904, but it was withdrawn to gain unanimous support from all chapters in Phi Delta Theta's Zeta Province, which included Colorado, Illinois, Iowa, Kansas, Nebraska, Minnesota, and Wisconsin. If this support was achieved, then the charter would be granted to the group without any action from the convention. The Knights of Classic Lore gained the support of all Phi Delta Theta groups in the province, except for Wisconsin Alpha, Illinois Beta, and Missouri Alpha. The Knights in turn unsuccessfully presented the petition at the 1906 convention in Washington, D.C. During the continuing struggle for acceptance from Phi Delta Theta, ΤΚΕ continued to grow stronger in its existence.

In late 1907, ΤΚΕ was preparing to petition Phi Delta Theta once again at the 1908 convention when an event took place that would forever change the course of history for the fraternity. At the annual initiation banquet on October 19, 1907, speeches were made that both advocated and questioned the continued petitioning of Phi Delta Theta. At the banquet, Wallace G. McCauley delivered a blistering speech known as "Opportunity Out of Defeat". The powerful address called for an abandonment of the petitioning initiative and a new campaign to make ΤΚΕ into a national fraternity itself. While there was some opposition at the time, the movement ultimately took hold, and by 1908, ΤΚΕ was well on its way to becoming a national fraternity in its own right. The speech was published in the first issue of The Teke in January 1908, and by November of that year, work was beginning on a new constitution. At the chapter meeting held on Monday, February 15, 1909, the new constitution became official. The first Conclave of the Grand Chapter of the new national fraternity of Tau Kappa Epsilon convened on February 17, 1909.

=== Expansion ===
In 1909, ΤΚΕ approached the Chi Rho Sigma local fraternity at Millikin University in Decatur, Illinois. There were no national fraternities at Millikin at this time, and ΤΚΕ had just established its intentions to become a national fraternity. Representatives from ΤΚΕ presented their case, and after thorough consideration, Chi Rho Sigma voted to accept ΤΚΕ's offer. On April 17, 1909, Chi Rho Sigma was installed as the Beta chapter of ΤΚΕ. In November 1911, the Beta Rho Delta local fraternity was founded at the University of Illinois. ΒΡΔ petitioned Tau Kappa Epsilon in January 1912, and they were installed as the Gamma chapter of ΤΚΕ on February 3, 1912. Following the installation of the Gamma chapter, The Teke magazine noted that the triangle was completed. The geographic location of ΤΚΕ's first three chapters form a perfect equilateral triangle. The equilateral triangle was at that time, and continues to be, the primary symbol of Tau Kappa Epsilon.

The national fraternity Sigma Mu Sigma merged with ΤΚΕ in March 1935. The merger resulted in the new Alpha-Pi chapter of ΤΚΕ at George Washington University and additional members for the Gamma chapter at the University of Illinois and the Alpha-Zeta chapter at Purdue University.

Before 1939, ΤΚΕ chapters were installed after local fraternities petitioned ΤΚΕ for approval. In 1939, a colonization process was established to promote expansion and to ensure that potential chapters met all requirements before installation. The first two ΤΚΕ colonies were the Eta colony at the University of Kansas and the Chi Beta colony at the University of Missouri.

Tau Kappa Epsilon expanded for the first time into the Deep South region of the United States in 1946. This expansion was made possible when Alpha Lambda Tau, a small predominantly Southern national fraternity, announced its dissolution. Five of Alpha Lambda Tau's eight active chapters affiliated with ΤΚΕ, resulting in new ΤΚΕ chapters at the University of Maryland, North Carolina State University, Auburn University, Louisiana Polytechnic Institute, and Tri-State College.

=== Presidential recognition ===
President Ronald Reagan, the 40th U.S. president and a TKE member, speaks about Tau Kappa Epsilon

On January 20, 1981, Tau Kappa Epsilon member Ronald Reagan was sworn in as the 40th President of the United States. Reagan joined ΤΚΕ at the Iota chapter at Eureka College in 1929. Throughout his time as President of the United States, Reagan remained actively involved in Tau Kappa Epsilon.

In 1983, President Reagan created the Ronald Reagan Leadership Award to recognize selected student members of ΤΚΕ that have demonstrated superior academic and leadership accomplishments.

In March 1984, President Reagan sponsored a ΤΚΕ alumni luncheon at the White House. Approximately 60 members of ΤΚΕ were invited to the White House luncheon. At the luncheon, Reagan was awarded ΤΚΕ's Order of the Golden Eagle and the Gold Medal of the North American Interfraternity Conference (NIC) recognizing his lifelong efforts to support and promote college fraternities. Reagan was the first Teke and first U.S. president to receive the Gold Medal of the NIC.

During the Spring Quarter of 1985 at the Alpha-Omega chapter (UCLA), Frater Reagan was hosted to an informal reception by the chapter's active members. There was no pre-screening of the house or its members by the Secret Service. Photos were taken to commemorate the event and the meeting was both up-building to the chapter and Frater Reagan. Coincidentally and as of June 2010, the brand-new UCLA Medical Center was named in his honor (Ronald Reagan UCLA Medical Center), a leading teaching and research hospital, and is a stone's throw from the chapter house.

In October 1984, President Reagan attended lunch at the ΤΚΕ house at Ohio State University in Columbus, Ohio, which hosted President Reagan for lunch following a rally in which he was speaking at Ohio State.

In June 1988, President Reagan hosted a special ΤΚΕ ceremony in the Oval Office at the White House, where he presented the Ronald Reagan Leadership Award/Scholarship to ΤΚΕ member Alan Friel. During the ceremony at the White House, President Reagan was presented with ΤΚΕ's Order of the Silver Maple Leaf by ΤΚΕ Grand Prytanis Bruce Melchert.

=== Responding to changes ===
By the late 1980s, public perception of fraternities and their conduct was deteriorating, which affected recruitment and membership growth across many of Tau Kappa Epsilon's chapters. In response, the Grand Chapter of Tau Kappa Epsilon voted to eliminate traditional pledging and implement several membership development programs including a formal candidate education program and membership quality boards (MQBs), which were constituted at each chapter to review membership conduct.

The fraternity continued to enact various changes to its structure and operations throughout the remainder of the 20th century. In 1991, the Grand Chapter of Tau Kappa Epsilon voted to abolish female auxiliary groups associated with chapters, also known as "Little Sisters". Membership decline continued throughout most of the 1990s, which prompted the fraternity to respond with additional long-range plans to boost membership recruitment and minimize risk management costs.

The early 21st century brought a reinvigoration of the fraternity. Considerable resources were invested to upgrade the fraternity's infrastructure, improve its communication strategy, and reorganize professional staff across the United States and Canada. In the following years, Tau Kappa Epsilon saw improvements in numerous areas of the fraternity including average chapter size, philanthropy projects, and public service hours.

== Symbols and traditions ==
The fraternity's motto is "Better Men for a Better World".

=== Apollo ===
The mythological ideal or patron of Tau Kappa Epsilon is Apollo, an important and complex Olympian deity in Greek and Roman mythology. Apollo is the Greek god of music and culture, of light and truth, the ideals toward which the organization strives in their development of manhood.

=== Badge ===
ΤΚΕ membership badge

The official membership badge, made of gold and adorned with three white pearls, is by far the most important item of ΤΚΕ insignia in general use. This badge may be worn only by initiated members. Jeweled badges, crowns set with pearls, diamonds, rubies, or emeralds, according to choice, may be worn by alumni members. Frequently the standard membership badge is used as a token of engagement. Miniature badges are also available for mothers, sisters, wives, chapter sweethearts, or engagement purposes. The ΤΚΕ 'badge of gold,' unique in its design and distinctiveness, has never been changed since its adoption.

=== Red carnation ===
The red carnation is the flower of the fraternity. From this flower, the color for the coat-of-arms, flag, and other symbols are derived. Red carnations are also worn at ΤΚΕ banquets. The Red Carnation Ball is a dance that many chapters celebrate and is named after the flower.

=== Coat-of-arms ===
The coat-of-arms may be used only by official members of the Fraternity on stationery, jewelry, and other personal effects. Modified slightly several times during the early years of Tau Kappa Epsilon, the present Coat-of-Arms, adopted in 1926, was designed by Dr. Carlton B. Pierce and Ms. Emily Butterfield.

=== Flag ===
The ΤΚΕ flag properly displayed horizontally and vertically

The present design of the ΤΚΕ flag, as adopted at the 1961 Conclave, features five voided triangles, in cherry red, on a gray bend surmounting a cherry field. Because it is patterned after the shield of the fraternity Coat-of-Arms, the flag is readily associated with Tau Kappa Epsilon. Individual chapters may also purchase and use pennants and wall banners of various designs. These usually employ the name or Greek letters of the fraternity and chapter and may incorporate the basic ΤΚΕ insignia. ΤΚΕ insignia may be purchased only from the Offices of the Grand Chapter or a merchant licensed by the fraternity headquarters.

=== Horseshoe ===
In April 1921, members of the Fraternity at Ohio State University made their way to the Conclave in Madison, Wisconsin. After the vote granting their charter as the Omicron Chapter, one of the members pulled from the pocket of his pants a rusty horseshoe which the fraters had picked up along the way. Believing that the horseshoe had granted the chapter good luck, the tradition began to pass the horseshoe down to each chapter. The original horseshoe was lost during World War II at the Alpha-Chi Chapter (University of Louisville), but it was replaced with a new horseshoe to continue the tradition.

In mid-1995, the original horseshoe was discovered by Past Grand Prytanis Rodney Williams among some artifacts belonging to the Alpha-Chi Chapter, which had been held for years by a charter member of the chapter. At the 49th Biennial Conclave, the original ΤΚΕ horseshoe from the Omicron Chapter was displayed, and the story behind its loss was explained.

The horseshoe, now an adopted symbol, is traditionally displayed on a plaque given to new chapters at their founding.

=== Sweetheart song ===
The tradition of singing a sweetheart song to a fraternity's sweetheart is one shared by most fraternities. ΤΚΕ is rare in that it has three different sweetheart songs: "Sweetheart of T.K.E." recorded by The Lettermen in 1969; "Iota Sweetheart Song"; and "Old Sweetheart Song". "Old Sweetheart Song" was started at the Alpha-Xi chapter at Drake University.

=== Publications ===
The Teke is the award-winning official quarterly publication for undergraduate and alumni brothers of Tau Kappa Epsilon. The Teke magazine first appeared in January 1908. The Teke was suspended in the 1990s amid financial difficulties for the fraternity, but it was re-established in 1999.

The pledge manual of Tau Kappa Epsilon is known as The Teke Guide. Development of the manual began in 1927, and The Teke Guide was first published in 1935.

== Philanthropy ==
Tau Kappa Epsilon provides support for numerous philanthropies and charitable services, most notably St. Jude Children's Research Hospital, which was founded by Danny Thomas, a member of the Gamma-Nu Chapter at the University of Toledo. In 2019, Tau Kappa Epsilon increased its commitment towards St. Jude Children's Research Hospital with pledging to raise $10 million within the next 10 years. As of July 2022, ΤΚΕ has raised $3.3 million towards this commitment.

== Governance ==
The Board of Directors of the Fraternity is known as the Grand Council, which is composed of the Grand Prytanis (Grand President) and seven other Grand Officers elected at Conclave, one representative selected by the Collegiate Advisory Committee (CAC), and two other alumni selected by the Grand Officers as ex-officio, voting members. The Grand Council is entrusted with authority over managing the property, assets, and finances of the Fraternity, adopting budgets and financial estimates, proposing amendments to the Fraternity's Articles of Incorporation, and authorizing the establishment of colonies or affiliated local fraternities. The Grand Council also oversees the chief executive officer (CEO) of the International Fraternity who manages day-to-day operations, subject to the direction and control of the Grand Council. The CAC and its chairman are active undergraduate members appointed by the CEO of the Fraternity and approved by several past Grand Prytani (Grand Presidents) to act as advisers to the Grand Council with the CAC chairman serving on the Grand Council.

The current Grand Prytanis (Grand President) is Mike McEvilly of the Beta-Eta chapter.

== Chapters ==
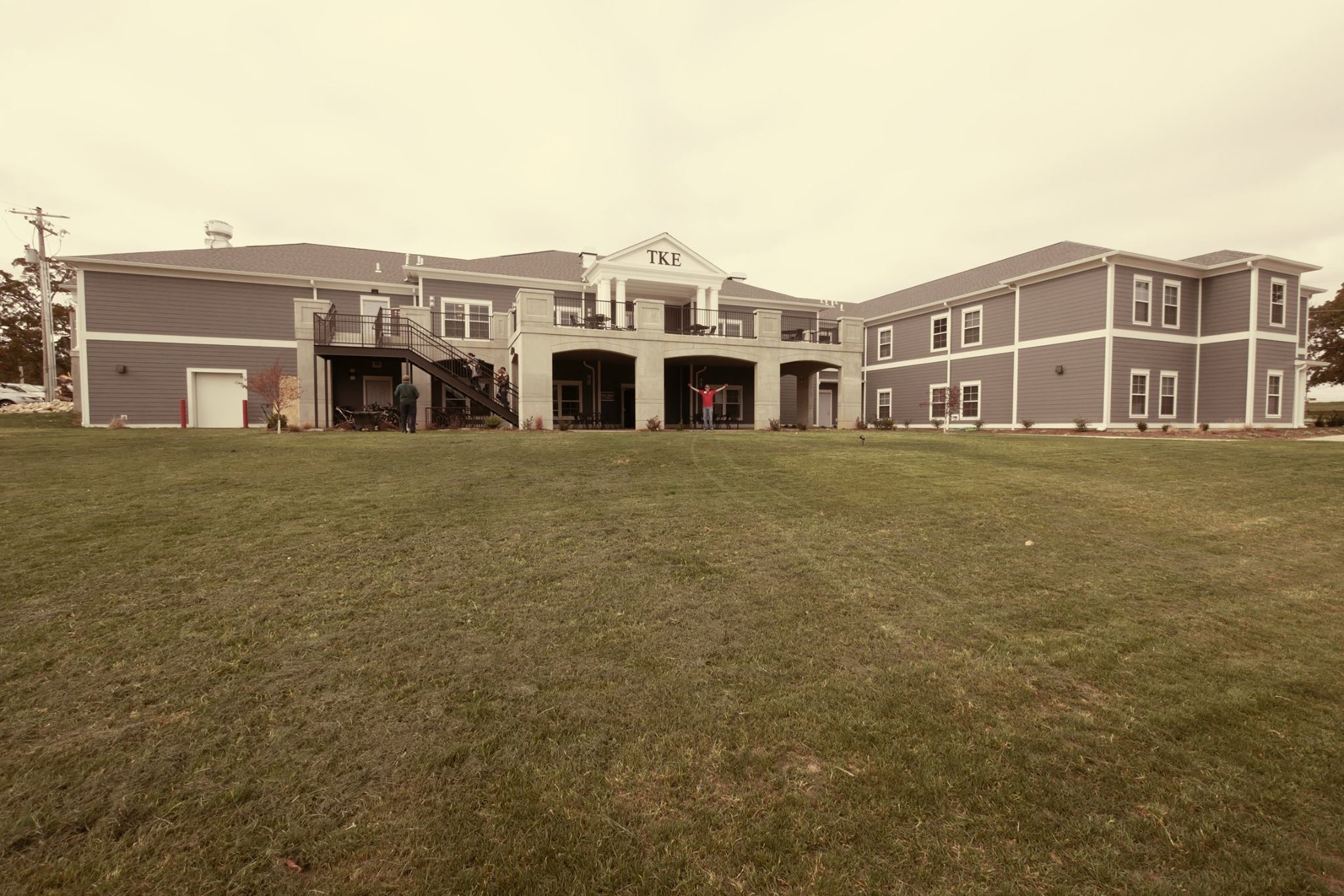
The ΤΚΕ chapter house at Missouri University of Science and Technology in Rolla, Missouri

ΤΚΕ chapters and colonies are individual organizations of initiated members associated with a university or college. After the first, or single-letter Alpha series, chapters are named with a two-letter Greek letter combination in alphabetical order of the Greek alphabet, such as Alpha-Alpha, Beta-Alpha, etc. The Greek letter "Eta" was skipped over as a named series. Naming occurs according to the date when the chapter's charter was granted. In one exception to this general rule, the group that would have been the Sigma chapter received special permission to be referred to as the Scorpion chapter, honoring the name of a long-standing local affiliate into the Fraternity.

A colony is defined as an unchartered organization of the Fraternity until officially granted a charter by the Grand Council, which is the board of directors of the Fraternity. Once a colony has obtained at least 20 qualified members and has petitioned for a charter, the Grand Council may grant a charter by a two-thirds vote. As of 2022, "colonies" are officially referred to as "emerging chapters" by the Fraternity.

Chapters may have become inactive after being granted a charter, due to membership decline, misconduct, or school closure. In some cases, the Fraternity and alumni volunteers may restore a dormant chapter using the same chapter name. Numerous chapters that were once closed have recolonized and have successfully reestablished themselves in their school and community.

Tau Kappa Epsilon is also affiliated with the German fraternity system known as the Corps of the Weinheimer Senioren-Convent (WSC). The WSC serves as an umbrella organization for 60 student Corps in 22 cities all over Germany. In furtherance of this International fraternal friendship, Past Executive Vice President Timothy J. Murphy became part of Corps Franconia Darmstadt (Darmstadt Technical University) receiving the status of "Inhaber der Corpsschleife" (IdC), a rarity for a foreign national. He has since spoken at fraternity congresses and gatherings in Weinheim and Würzburg, Germany.

== Notable members ==
Ronald Reagan signing autographs for his fellow Tekes

The list of Tau Kappa Epsilon brothers spans multiple careers including politics, business, athletics, and entertainment. Among the most recognized include U.S. President Ronald Reagan, who was the recipient of the Order of the Golden Eagle, the fraternity's highest honor. Other widely recognized political figures include former West Virginia Senator Robert Byrd, who at the time of his death was the longest-serving member in the history of the United States Congress, and former Arkansas governor and Republican presidential candidate Mike Huckabee, who while running for president launched a ΤΚΕ-specific website and visited Tekes on the campaign trail.

Dozens of top CEOs and university presidents have also made the list such as Howard Schultz of Starbucks, Marc Benioff of Salesforce, and Steve Forbes of Forbes magazine, who was the fraternity's 250,000th initiate. Numerous athletic and music superstars are also Tekes including NFL quarterbacks Terry Bradshaw, Phil Simms, and Aaron Rodgers, Olympians Douglas Blubaugh, Sim Iness, and Johnny Quinn, and singers Elvis Presley, Willie Nelson, and the Everly Brothers.

== Local chapter or member misconduct ==
- In 2011, The Radford University chapter made national headlines after a pledge died partaking in a drinking hazing ritual. Six members of the fraternity were arrested and charged with his death.
- The Arizona State University chapter was placed on probation in 2013 after twenty ΤΚΕ members attacked three members of the Delta Kappa Epsilon (DKE) fraternity. One DKE member was beaten so badly that he had to be transferred to an emergency room with a concussion and broken jaw.
- The Arizona State University chapter was expelled by the university in 2014 after photos surfaced of a racially-themed "MLK Black Party" on Martin Luther King Jr. Day holiday weekend; although, it later surfaced that the event was not planned by members of the fraternity. The party included guests wearing basketball jerseys, flashing gang signs, and drinking from watermelon cups. The school's decision to ban the chapter was also because the ΤΚΕ chapter had recently been placed on probation after two members of the fraternity pleaded guilty to the aggravated assault of a student from another fraternity. The national fraternity issued an apology and condemned the event but insisted that the party was "without malice or forethought", that there were fewer than 30 men and women at the event which didn't meet Arizona State IFC guidelines for an official fraternity function, and that the ASU chapter was one of the most "multi-cultural social fraternities" at the university.
- Two men from the Rowan University chapter were suspended in 2014 for an illicit sex tape recorded in the fraternity house that was leaked to the public.
- In 2014, the Johnson & Wales University chapter was sued by a formal pledge after a brutal hazing ritual that left him hospitalized for over a month. He was branded, urinated on by members, paddled, deprived of sleep, forced to exercise, forced to swim in his vomit, and asked to participate in a host of many other demeaning activities. He was the only remaining pledge after the rest of his pledge class dropped due to abuse and harassment perpetrated by members of the fraternity.
- In 2015, a member of the Northwest Missouri State University chapter was arrested and charged with first-degree rape of a female student at the fraternity house on campus. The chapter was placed on suspension for the incident.
- The Towson University chapter was suspended for hazing in 2015 after WBAL News Radio reported that a pledge was "forced to eat cat food and a liquid he was told was vinegar and pickle juice by members of Tau Kappa Epsilon fraternity" and that "the student started vomiting blood hours later and was taken to a nearby hospital later that day".
- The Florida State University chapter was suspended for hazing and misconduct violations in 2015. The pledges were forced to participate in a hazing activity called "Old South" where pledges acted like slaves in blackface while serving drinks to members. Also, the pledges were twice blindfolded and dropped off hours away from campus without their wallets and cellphones and then told to find their way back to campus.
- In 2019, the chapter at Appalachian State University lost university recognition and privileges due to violating the university's code of conduct and assaulting women.

== See also ==
- List of social fraternities
