= Acacia Fraternity =

North American collegiate fraternity

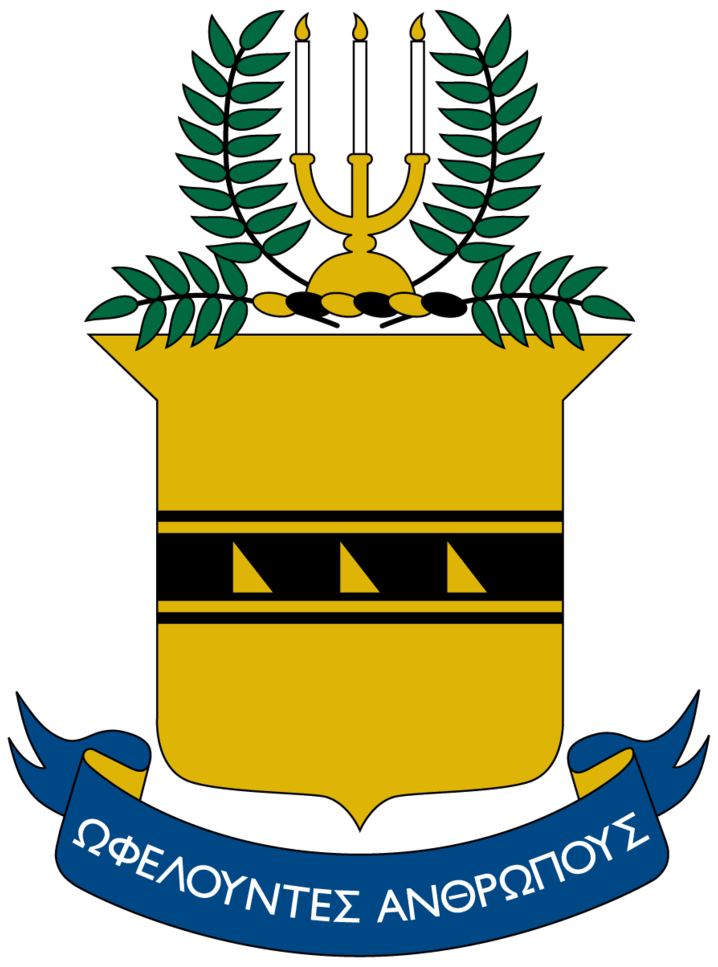
- Founded: May 12, 1904; 122 years ago University of Michigan
- Type: Social
- Affiliation: NIC
- Status: Active
- Scope: North America
- Motto: ΩΦΕΛΟΥΝΤΕΣ ΑΝΘΡΩΠΟΥΣ' "Human Service"
- Pillars: Scholarship, Leadership, Brotherhood, Philanthropy
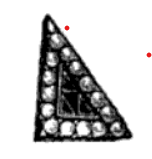
- Member badge
- Colors: Old Gold and Black
- Symbol: 3-4-5 right triangle of the first quadrant
- Flag
- Flower: Sprig of Acacia in bloom
- Chapters: 20 Active, 3 Associate
- Mentor: Pythagoras
- Headquarters: 12721 Meeting House Road; Carmel, Indiana 46032; United States
- Website: acacia.org

Acacia Fraternity is a social fraternity founded in 1904 at the University of Michigan in Ann Arbor, Michigan. The fraternity has 20 active chapters and 3 associate chapters throughout Canada and the United States. The fraternity was founded by undergraduate Freemasons and was originally open only to men who had taken the Masonic obligations, but in 1933 the International Conclave elected to dispense with the Masonic prerequisite. In 1988, at the 45th Conclave, the fraternity elected to use "International" rather than "National" when referring to the fraternity.

== History ==
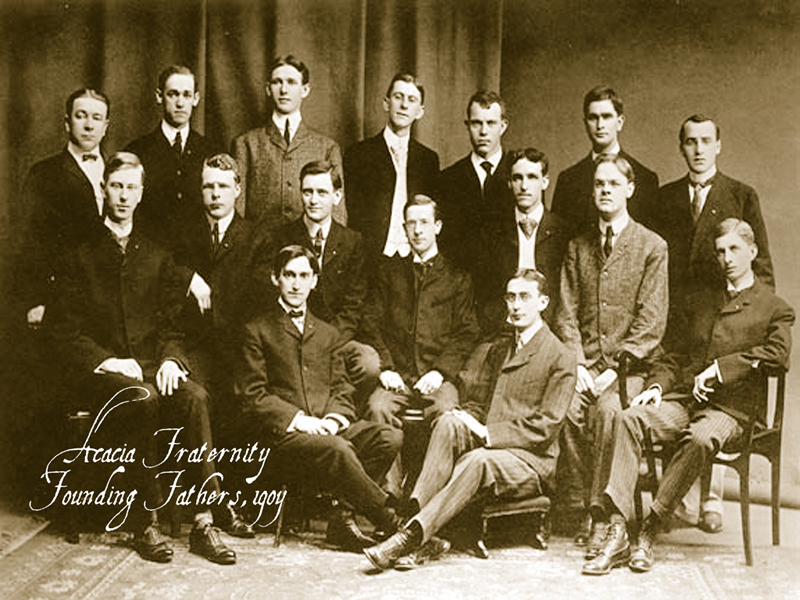
The founding members of the Acacia fraternity in 1904

Acacia Fraternity was founded on May 12, 1904, by a group of fourteen Freemasons attending the University of Michigan in Ann Arbor, Michigan. Its founders were James M. Cooper, Benjamin E. DeRoy, Edward E. Gallup, Jared W. Hawkins, Clarence G. Hill, Harvey J. Howard, George A. Malcolm, Ernest R. Ringo, William J. Marshall, Harlan P. Rowe, Ralph B. Scatterday, Charles A. Sink, Harry B. Washburn, and Walter S. Wheeler. Acacia is the only general fraternity to be founded in Michigan.

Since its founding, members of other fraternities have been eligible for membership in Acacia. However, the fraternity's rapid growth allowed it to stand on its own as a separate and co-equal fraternity, and in 1921 it dropped the provision that allowed men of other fraternities to join.

During the first two decades of the 20th century, Acacia was evolving from its roots as a successful Masonic club into the more standardized model of the other collegiate fraternities of the day. While maintaining its history and the symbolism derived from the Masonic fraternity, because of what Baird's cites (pIII-1) as a decline in the number of student Masons in undergraduate schools, Acacia opted in 1931 to relax the requirement that members must be Masons, removing the provision entirely in 1933.

Early chapters were named alphabetically using Hebrew letters; these first 26 chapters at their option continue to use their historical designations today, while younger chapters are named after the institution at which they are located.

The fraternity officially became International in 1988 at the 45th Conclave after the addition of the University of Western Ontario Chapter and the petition of the Carleton University Chapter.

== Symbols ==
The Sprig of Acacia represents immortality and is one of many Acacia symbols with roots in the Masonic Brotherhood. It is used by that organization during or after a funeral service, to honor a brother who has died. According to tradition, the symbol also reminds participants of the obligation that Masons must provide for the widow and children of their fallen brother. The Acacia fraternity has adopted this and other Masonic symbols, retaining them in linkage to its heritage.

The Acacia flag was adopted in 1950. It consists of a vertical triband of gold-black-gold with the fraternity coat of arms in the center (or on a fess cotised sable three right triangles of the field) and the name in gold Old English lettering in an arc at the top.

The main symbol and representation of Acacia occurs within a 3-4-5 (base-altitude-hypotenuse) right triangle of the first quadrant. This triangle holds very special significance to the fraternity and its members, symbolizing the imperfect nature of man as well as the struggle to approach an ideal, which symbolically is occasionally represented as a circle. Unless specified otherwise, whenever a triangle is mentioned in this article, a 3-4-5 right triangle of the first quadrant is what is meant.

The present Acacia badge is a right triangle of the first quadrant whose sides are of the proportions three, four, and five with the shortest side being the base. The sides are set with twelve pearls—three on the base, four on the altitude, and five on the hypotenuse. The corners are set with garnets. Within the triangle are three small right triangles of the same proportion, outlined in gold on a black enamel background. The badge of Acacia as it appears today was adopted at the second Grand Council of Acacia, which was held on December 6, 1913.

The crest of Acacia depicts a three-taper candelabrum surrounded by a wreath of Acacia. Below a shield of old gold, on fess cottised sable three 3-4-5 right triangles. Below the shield is a blue ribbon holding the motto of the fraternity in Greek: ΩΦΕΛΟΥΝΤΕΣ ΑΝΘΡΩΠΟΥΣ ("Human Service" or "In Service of Humanity"). The fraternity's pillars are Scholarship, Leadership, Brotherhood, and Philanthropy.

== Activities ==
In even-numbered years, the Acacia hosts its biennial Conclave, forming the legislative body of the fraternity. Each chapter in good standing is allowed two votes (usually the Venerable Dean and Chapter Advisor). In odd-numbered years, Acacia's Indiana chapter hosts the Acacia Leadership Academy (ALA) which provides leadership training to undergraduate members of the fraternity.

== Governance ==
Acacia Fraternity's International Council serves as the organization's supreme executive and judicial body. It is composed of eight officers: six alumni and two undergraduates. Alumni officers' terms run four years, while undergraduate counselors' terms are two years.

The Acacia Fraternity Foundation (AFF), founded in 1989, is Acacia Fraternity's non-profit educational foundation. A 501(c)(3) tax-exempt organization, the AFF exists to provide scholarships to student Acacians and to support the worthy educational and leadership activities of the fraternity.

The leadership of each chapter of Acacia is composed of at least five major officers: the venerable dean, senior dean, junior dean, treasurer, and secretary. Most chapters also include in some capacity a director of service and philanthropy, director(s) of recruitment, and risk manager. The venerable dean is often referred to out of the house as the president of the chapter and performs such duties as running meetings and overseeing general house operations. The senior dean acts as the vice president of the chapter, stepping in for the venerable dean in his absence. In most cases, the senior dean is also the pledge educator. The junior dean is in charge of all socials, including brotherhood events, formals, and mixers. The other two officers perform such functions as are normal for their positions. Some chapters assign additional responsibilities to various officers, so there may be slight variations from chapter to chapter.

== Local chapter misconduct ==
- In 1993, the University of Kansas chapter of Acacia had its charter revoked after a raucous party that caused $50,000 worth of damage to the fraternity's house.
- In 2012, the Indiana University Bloomington chapter of Acacia was suspended for at least two years for hazing violations. The fraternity has since rechartered.
- In 2013, two Acacia brothers at Penn State were charged with ethnic intimidation and criminal mischief after spray-painting anti-Semitic language, swastikas, and sexual references at Jewish fraternity Beta Sigma Beta.
- In 2015, the Purdue University chapter of Acacia was suspended due to underage drinking violations and the rape of an Iowa college student that occurred at the same party.
- In 2015, the Louisiana State University chapter of Acacia was suspended until 2018 due to hazing violations.
- In 2015, the Miami University chapter of Acacia closed for its inability to comply with Miami's Community Advancement Program (programming and membership development standards) as well as hazing and forced drinking of underage pledges. The National Organization has no plans to re-establish the Chapter.
- In 2016, the University of Illinois at Urbana–Champaign chapter of Acacia held a controversial party with the Alpha Phi sorority where members dressed in various stereotypical ethnic costumes, triggering a backlash from Black, Latino, Muslim and LGBT student groups on campus.
- In 2017, Acacia and Millersville University of Pennsylvania were sued for the death of Karlie Hall, who was murdered in her dorm room by her boyfriend Greg Orrostieta after leaving an Acacia party.
- In 2020, the University of Iowa chapter of Acacia was suspended following alleged hazing incidents.
- In 2022, the Ohio State University chapter of Acacia was suspended for hazing pledges, failure to comply with university or civil authority, and dishonest conduct.
- In 2024, the Illinois State University chapter of Acacia was suspended by Acacia nationals for underage drinking and hosting unregistered social events.
- In 2025, the Arizona State University chapter of Acacia chose to disband after chapter leadership and members opted not to renew their housing commitment at the Greek Leadership Village, citing high living costs

== See also ==
- List of social fraternities
