= List of Alpha Sigma Phi chapters =

Alpha Sigma Phi is an international intercollegiate men's social fraternity that was established at Yale University in 1845. It absorbed 4 chapters of Phi Phi Phi in 1939, followed by 28 active chapters of Alpha Kappa Pi on September 6, 1946. In 1965, it absorbed Alpha Gamma Upsilon. The fraternity refers to colonies as provisional chapters.

In the following list of Alpha Sigma Phi chapters, active chapters are in bold and inactive chapters and institutions are in italics.

| Chapter | Charter date and range | Institution | Location | Status | Ref. |
|---|---|---|---|---|---|
| Alpha | December 6, 1845 – 1864; March 28, 1907 – 1942; December 6, 2000 – 2003 | Yale University | New Haven, Connecticut | Inactive | (Note: From 1864 to 1876, the chapter operated under the alias of Delta Beta Xi. The 1907 restoration came from the absorption of the Masonic Club (local), which had originated in 1906. The chapter went inactive again during World War II.) |
| Beta | June 15, 1850 – 1857; April 4, 1911 – November 18, 1932 | Harvard University | Cambridge, Massachusetts | Inactive | (Note: The chapter closed in 1857 after anti-fraternity policies for freshmen were introduced to the campus in October 1856. In 1932, repeated efforts to devolve the chapter into a local group finally succeeded. The successor, named after its street number address, 54 Dunster Street, was the short-lived 54 Club.) |
| Gamma (first) | June 10, 1854 – 1862 | Amherst College | Amherst, Massachusetts | Inactive | |
| **Delta** | June 30, 1860 – 1993; April 5, 2013 | Marietta College | Marietta, Ohio | Active | (Note: Chapter was suspended in 1993 for risk management violations and member misconduct. It reformed as a provisional chapter in 2012.) |
| **Epsilon** | June 19, 1863 – 1865; 1913–1970; April 24, 1993 | Ohio Wesleyan University | Delaware, Ohio | Active | (Note: Chapter was originally chartered at Delaware College, now Ohio Wesleyan. It went inactive during the Civil War. At its 1913 restoration, the chapter absorbed the Union Club (local), established in 1912. At its 1993 restoration, the chapter absorbed the B.O.S.S. Club, established in 1991.) |
| **Zeta** | May 5, 1908 | Ohio State University | Columbus, Ohio | Active | |
| **Eta** | June 25, 1908 – 197x ?; 1982 | University of Illinois Urbana-Champaign | Urbana, Illinois | Active | (Note: This chapter formed from the E.O.S. Club, established in 1907. In 1936, it absorbed the Delta chapter of Phi Pi Phi, formed in 1923, and whose national organization was disbanding. This led to a short, precautionary suspension of ΑΣΦ by the NIC due to concern over chapter poaching, but no fault was found, and the suspension was rescinded the following year. In 1946, the chapter absorbed members of the Sigma chapter of Alpha Kappa Pi, at the merger of the two fraternities.) |
| **Theta** | October 23, 1908 – 1992; 1997 | University of Michigan | Ann Arbor, Michigan | Active | |
| **Iota** | March 27, 1909 | Cornell University | Ithaca, New York | Active | |
| **Kappa** | April 1, 1909 – 1939; 1949–1954; February 28, 2015 | University of Wisconsin–Madison | Madison, Wisconsin | Active | (Note: This chapter formed from Alpha Omicron (local), established before 1909. It ceased operations during World War II, was revived in 1949, but that group closed in 1954. The chapter was finally revived in 2015.) (Note: In 2019, the chapter at the University of Wisconsin was suspended and, after suspension, placed on a short-term probation, now rescinded, for hazing and public humiliation. Pledges had been forced to run errands for initiated members, wear Dora the Explorer backpacks, and carry fruit on campus.) |
| Lambda | May 8, 1910 – 1957 | Columbia University | New York City, New York | Inactive | |
| **Mu** | May 20, 1912 | University of Washington | Seattle, Washington | Active | |
| **Gamma (second)** | February 14, 1913 – 1943; May 10, 1955 – 1971; October 12, 1996 – Fall 2000; May 15, 2013 | University of Massachusetts Amherst | Amherst, Massachusetts | Active | (Note: Chapter formed as Gamma Deuteron chapter from the C.S.C. Club, or Campus Shakespeare Club, a property-owning local that had originated in 1879. Shortly afterward, it began using the name Gamma. It went inactive during World War II. For its 1955 restoration, it absorbed Delta Phi Gamma (local), established in 1952.) |
| **Nu** | February 1, 1913 – 1969; February 27, 1982 | University of California, Berkeley | Berkeley, California | Active | (Note: This chapter formed from the Atherton Club (local), established in 1904.) |
| Xi | April 4, 1913 – 1954 | University of Nebraska–Lincoln | Lincoln, Nebraska | Inactive | |
| Omicron | May 16, 1914 – 1978; February 7, 2015 – 2019 | University of Pennsylvania | Philadelphia, Pennsylvania | Inactive | (Note: This chapter formed from the Comedy Club (local), established in 1913.) |
| **Pi** | February 16, 1915 – 1939; 1949–1957; April 7, 2013 | University of Colorado Boulder | Boulder, Colorado | Active | (Note: This chapter formed from the Sans Souci Club (local), established in 1908.) |
| Rho | March 28, 1916 – 1935 | University of Minnesota | Minneapolis, Minnesota | Inactive | (Note: This chapter formed from Alpha Theta Psi (local), established in 1915.) |
| **Sigma** | April 4, 1917 – 1960; March 23, 2017 | University of Kentucky | Lexington, Kentucky | Active | (Note: This chapter formed from Phi Sigma (local), established in 1914.) (Note: In 2021, the University of Kentucky chapter made news as a result of a brawl which reportedly resulted, in significant part, from racist epithets directed at six Black UK football players who had arrived at the fraternity. The players were charged with burglary by the Lexington Police Department. On September 28, 2021, a Fayette County, Kentucky grand jury determined that the charges were fabricated by the police and those charges were dismissed. In September of 2022, the players brought suit against two Lexington police officers and the police chief. The chapter was issued a year of probation by the university after the altercation. The bases for the discipline were described by a local newspaper: Alpha Sigma Phi’s violations included failure to comply, hazing, misuses of alcohol and failure to follow UK’s COVID-19 health and safety guidelines, according to UK’s website. The code of student conduct defines failure to comply as deliberate noncompliance with directions of UK officials or law enforcement officers, including “failure to properly identify oneself to these persons when requested to do so.” The suits against one officer and the chief were dismissed by District Judge Gregory F. Van Tatenhove of the United States District Court for the Eastern District of Kentucky at Lexington, and the dismissals were affirmed by a three-judge panel of the United States Court of Appeals for the Sixth Circuit on October 10, 2025. In its published decision the court of appeals wrote of the officer accused of fabricating evidence against the players, Detective Cory B. Vinlove: Vinlove — despite having access to information which indicated the Black football players were victims of racism at the hands of several white fraternity members — charged the Black teammates with burglary, stating that the teammates forced entry into the home before physically assaulting its occupants. The case against Vinlove was not dismissed by the district court.) |
| Tau | December 22, 1917 – 1983 | Stanford University | Stanford, California | Inactive | (Note: This chapter formed from the Alvadado Club (local), established in 1915. It withdrew from the fraternity in 1983 to become coed.) |
| **Upsilon** | February 9, 1918 – 2000; October 7, 2006 | Pennsylvania State University | State College, Pennsylvania | Active | (Note: Chapter formed from the Viking Club (local), established in 1912. In 1946, it absorbed the Omicron chapter of Alpha Kappa Pi, as part of the national merger of the two fraternities.) |
| **Phi** | May 8, 1920 – 1941; June 5, 1954 – December 2, 1993; April 26, 1997 | Iowa State University | Ames, Iowa | Active | (Note: The chapter formed from the Palisades Club, established in 1910. It went inactive during World War II. A fire in 1991 significantly damaged the chapter's house and caused financial difficulties. Its charter was surrendered in 1993. In 1995, an interest group called BEST (Brotherhood, Excellence, Spirit, and Truth) was formed and became a colony that was chartered in 1997.) |
| Chi | May 15, 1920 – 1935 | University of Chicago | Chicago, Illinois | Inactive | (Note: This chapter formed from the Washington House local fraternity, established in 1898. It closed due to the Great Depression.) |
| Psi | May 20, 1920 – 2004; June 2, 2012 – 2024 | Oregon State University | Corvallis, Oregon | Inactive | (Note: This chapter formed from the Aztec Club (local), established in 1913.) |
| Omega | | | | Memorial | |
| Alpha Alpha | May 19, 1923 – 1938; 1948–1987; October 7, 1997 – 2001; September 23, 2018 – 2025 | University of Oklahoma | Norman, Oklahoma | Inactive | (Note: This chapter formed from Delta Kappa Rho (local), established in 1921.) |
| **Alpha Beta** | February 2, 1924 – 1940; February 28, 2017 | University of Iowa | Iowa City, Iowa | Active | (Note: This chapter formed from Delta Kappa Gamma (local), established in 1920.) |
| **Alpha Gamma** | March 28, 1925 – 1936; April 24, 2015 | Carnegie Mellon University | Pittsburgh, Pennsylvania | Active | (Note: This chapter formed from Iota Sigma Delta (local), established in 1916.) |
| Alpha Delta | May 23, 1925 – 1947 | Middlebury College | Middlebury, Vermont | Inactive | (Note: This chapter formed from Alpha Sigma Phi (local with the same name), established in 1912 as an outgrowth of the Commons Club, established in 1906. The chapter withdrew over a dispute over membership qualification requirements, which had been adopted at the time of the merger with Alpha Kappa Pi. It operated as a local fraternity with the same name into the 1960s.) |
| Alpha Epsilon | June 9, 1925 – April 13, 1959 | Syracuse University | Syracuse, New York | Inactive | (Note: This chapter formed from Kappa Theta (local), established in 1920.) |
| Alpha Zeta | June 26, 1926 – 1973; October 1984 – 1993 | University of California, Los Angeles | Los Angeles, California | Inactive | (Note: This chapter formed from Tau Nu Lambda (local), established in 1924 to join Alpha Sigma Phi.) |
| Alpha Eta | March 3, 1928 – February 1936 | Dartmouth College | Hanover, New Hampshire | Inactive | (Note: This chapter formed from Sigma Alpha (local), established in 1925. After its chapter house burned in February 1936, its members withdrew from the national fraternity and operated as Sigma Alpha (local) through the fall of 1936.) |
| **Alpha Theta** | November 23, 1929 – 1966; April 3, 1980 – 1994; 2021 | University of Missouri | Columbia, Missouri | Active | (Note: Chapter formed from Chi Alpha Chi (local), established in 1925.) |
| **Alpha Iota** | May 3, 1930 – 1943; January 1948 – 1971; April 9, 2011 | University of Alabama | Tuscaloosa, Alabama | Active | (Note: Chapter formed from Chi Delta Epsilon (local), established in 1925.) |
| Alpha Kappa | October 24, 1931 – 1936; May 18, 1947 – 1964; April 18, 2015 - September 15, 2026 | West Virginia University | Morgantown, West Virginia | Inactive | (Note: Chapter formed from Tau Delta Theta (local), established in 1929. It went inactive due to the Great Depression. As of 2021, the chapter is voluntarily operating without university recognition.) |
| Alpha Lambda | October 7, 1939 – 1940 | Case Western Reserve University | Cleveland, Ohio | Inactive | (Note: Chapter originated in 1926 as the Lambda chapter of Phi Pi Phi, which merged with ΑΣΦ in 1939. "Lambda" formed from Tau Delta Tau (local), established in 1919.) |
| **Alpha Mu** | October 7, 1939 – 1979; February 1988–Fall 1991; January 16, 2010 | Baldwin Wallace University | Berea, Ohio | Active | (Note: This chapter originated in 1926 as the Mu chapter of Phi Pi Phi, which merged with ΑΣΦ in 1939. Mu formed from Gamma Lambda Sigma (local), established in 1915.) |
| **Alpha Nu** | October 4, 1939 | Westminster College | New Wilmington, Pennsylvania | Active | (Note: This chapter originated on February 27, 1927, as the Nu chapter of Phi Pi Phi, which merged with ΑΣΦ in 1939. Nu formed from the Crescent Club (local), established in 1906.) |
| **Alpha Xi** | October 28, 1939 | Illinois Institute of Technology | Chicago, Illinois | Active | (Note: This chapter originated in 1923 as the Gamma chapter of Phi Pi Phi, which merged with ΑΣΦ in 1939. Gamma dates to February 1, 1913, as the Gamma chapter of Beta Phi national fraternity, which dissolved in 1919.) |
| **Alpha Pi** | October 21, 1939 | Purdue University | West Lafayette, Indiana | Active | (Note: This chapter originated on May 17, 1930, as the Pi chapter of Phi Pi Phi, which merged with ΑΣΦ in 1939. Pi was formed from the Euphemian Club, a local fraternity established in 1926 that was also known as Phi Beta Epsilon.) |
| **Alpha Omicron** | June 2, 1945 | Missouri Valley College | Marshall, Missouri | Active | (Note: This chapter formed from Alpha Delta Kappa (local), which was established in 1927 as the Tri-C Club.) |
| **Alpha Rho** | September 6, 1946 – 1954; January 1982 | New Jersey Institute of Technology | Newark, New Jersey | Active | (Note: This chapter originated on March 23, 1926, as the Alpha chapter of Alpha Kappa Pi, which merged with ΑΣΦ in 1946.) |
| Alpha Sigma | September 6, 1946 – 1977 | Wagner College | Staten Island, New York | Inactive | (Note: This chapter originated on May 26, 1926, as the Beta chapter of Alpha Kappa Pi, which merged with ΑΣΦ in 1946.) |
| **Alpha Tau** | September 6, 1946 | Stevens Institute of Technology | Hoboken, New Jersey | Active | (Note: This chapter originated on June 29, 1926, as the Gamma chapter of Alpha Kappa Pi, which merged with ΑΣΦ in 1946. .) |
| Alpha Upsilon | September 6, 1946 – 1951 | Polytechnic Institute of Brooklyn | Brooklyn, New York | Inactive | (Note: This chapter originated on November 19, 1926, as the Delta chapter of Alpha Kappa Pi, which merged with ΑΣΦ in 1946.) |
| Alpha Phi | | Ellsworth College | Iowa Falls, Iowa | Never chartered | (Note: This chapter was never active or chartered as part of Alpha Sigma Phi. It was given a placeholder name to honor the Epsilon chapter of Alpha Kappa Pi when the two fraternities merged. Epsilon was chartered on January 1, 1927, and closed in the fall of 1928 when Ellsworth became a junior college.) |
| Alpha Chi | 1955–1982 | Coe College | Cedar Rapids, Iowa | Inactive | (Note: This chapter was formed from Alpha Theta Chi (local), established in 1955. However, its name dates to the 1946 merger of the fraternity with Alpha Kappa Pi. The latter had a Zeta chapter at Coe from January 7, 1928 to 1935. Although Zeta was inactive at the time of the merger, it was given an honorary placeholder name within the ranks of Alpha Sigma Phi.) |
| **Alpha Psi** | September 6, 1946 | Presbyterian College | Clinton, South Carolina | Active | (Note: This chapter originated on May 12, 1928, from the Eta chapter of Alpha Kappa Pi, which merged with ΑΣΦ in 1946.) |
| Beta Alpha | September 6, 1946 – 1960 | Mount Union College | Alliance, Ohio | Inactive | (Note: This chapter originated on May 4, 1929, from the Iota chapter of Alpha Kappa Pi, which merged with ΑΣΦ on September 6, 1946.) |
| Beta Beta | | Massachusetts Institute of Technology | Cambridge, Massachusetts | Never chartered | (Note: This chapter was never active or chartered as part of Alpha Sigma Phi. It was given a placeholder name to honor the Kappa chapter of Alpha Kappa Pi when the two fraternities merged. Kappa was chartered on May 4, 1929, and ceased operations in 1939. ΑΣΦ attempted to revive this chapter with a provisional chapter from 2012 to 2014, but that colony never chartered.) |
| **Beta Gamma** | September 6, 1946 | Bethany College | Bethany, West Virginia | Active | (Note: This chapter originated on June 1, 1929, as the Lambda chapter of Alpha Kappa Pi, which merged with ΑΣΦ in 1946. Lambda went inactive for three years during World War II.) |
| **Beta Delta** | September 6, 1946 – 1975; December 6, 1980 | Marshall University | Huntington, West Virginia | Active | (Note: This chapter originated on December 14, 1929, as the Mu chapter of Alpha Kappa Pi, which merged with ΑΣΦ in 1946.) |
| Beta Epsilon | September 6, 1946 – 2005 | Lehigh University | Bethlehem, Pennsylvania | Inactive | (Note: This chapter originated on January 31, 1930, as the Nu chapter of Alpha Kappa Pi, which merged with ΑΣΦ in 1946. The chapter was suspended in 2005 for violations of risk management and alcohol policies.) |
| **Beta Zeta** | February 18, 1978 – 1988; October 21, 2006 – 2013; April 9, 2016 | North Carolina State University | Raleigh, North Carolina | Active | (Note: This chapter was formed from an interest group that organized in April 2004 and became a colony on April 23, 2006. However, its name dates to the 1946 merger of the fraternity with Alpha Kappa Pi. The latter had a chapter at NCSU from May 26, 1930 to 1941. Although the chapter was inactive at the time of the merger, it was given an honorary placeholder name within the ranks of Alpha Sigma Phi.) |
| **Beta Eta** | October 2009–January 2014; September 16, 2021 | University of New Hampshire | Durham, New Hampshire | Active | (Note: This chapter formed from Chi Phi Alpha (local), established in 2005. However, its name dates to the 1946 merger of the fraternity with Alpha Kappa Pi. The latter had a Pi chapter" at the University of New Hampshire from January 31, 1931 to 1935. Although Pi" was inactive at the time of the merger, it was given an honorary placeholder name within the ranks of Alpha Sigma Phi.) |
| Beta Theta | September 6, 1946 – 1998; September 16, 2006 - October 20, 2025; | Rutgers University–New Brunswick | New Brunswick, New Jersey | Inactive | (Note: This chapter originated on March 28, 1931 as the Rho chapter of Alpha Kappa Pi, which merged with ΑΣΦ in 1946. The chapter was suspended by the university in 1998 and was reorganized as a colony in January 2001.) |
| Beta Iota | September 6, 1946 – 1969; April 26, 1973 – 1975; April 26, 1973 – 1992 | Tufts University | Medford, Massachusetts | Inactive | (Note: This chapter originated in 1931 as the Tau chapter of Alpha Kappa Pi, which merged with ΑΣΦ in 1946.) |
| Beta Kappa | | Centre College | Danville, Kentucky | Never chartered | (Note: This chapter was never active or chartered as part of Alpha Sigma Phi. It was given a placeholder name to honor the Upsilon chapter of Alpha Kappa Pi when the two fraternities merged. Upsilon was chartered on February 11, 1932, and closed in the fall of 1936.) |
| Beta Lambda | | St. John's College of Maryland | Annapolis, Maryland | Never chartered | (Note: This chapter was never active or chartered as part of Alpha Sigma Phi. It was given a placeholder name to honor the Phi chapter of Alpha Kappa Pi when the two fraternities merged. Pi was chartered on February 3, 1932, and closed sometime after 1936.) |
| **Beta Mu** | September 6, 1946 | Wake Forest University | Winston-Salem, North Carolina | Active | (Note: This chapter originated on May 18, 1932 as the Psi chapter of Alpha Kappa Pi, which merged with ΑΣΦ in 1946.) |
| **Beta Nu** | September 6, 1946 – 1955; 1957–1964; November 6, 1998 | West Virginia Wesleyan College | Buckhannon, West Virginia | Active | (Note: This chapter originated on April 22, 1933, as the Psi chapter of Alpha Kappa Pi, which merged with ΑΣΦ in 1946. The college suspended the chapter in 1955 and again in 1964. Several members from the 1964 suspension withdrew to form Delta Xi (local), which later became a chapter of Chi Phi. The chapter was reestablished as a colony in 1997 by absorbing 26 members of the Phi Kappa chapter of Phi Sigma Epsilon, established in 1959, but released from that fraternity when it disbanded in 1988.) |
| **Beta Xi** | September 6, 1946 – March 2006; 200x ? | Hartwick College | Oneonta, New York | Active | (Note: This chapter originated on May 4, 1935, as the Alpha Alpha chapter of Alpha Kappa Pi, which merged with ΑΣΦ in 1946. It was suspended in 2006 when two students were hospitalized for alcohol poisoning. The chapter maintained that the alcohol was consumed at a bar after the fraternity event. After this event, Hatwick considered eliminating its fraternity system, but ultimately allowed it to continue.) |
| **Beta Omicron** | September 6, 1946 | Trine University | Angola, Indiana | Active | (Note: The chapter was formed at Tri-State University, which was renamed Trine University in 2008. It originated on November 8, 1935, as the Alpha Beta chapter of Alpha Kappa Pi, which merged with ΑΣΦ in 1946.) |
| Beta Pi | September 6, 1946 – 1949; 1980s–1990s | Franklin & Marshall College | Lancaster, Pennsylvania | Inactive | (Note: Chapter originated on September 11, 1936, as the Alpha Gamma chapter of Alpha Kappa Pi, which merged with ΑΣΦ in 1946.) |
| **Beta Rho** | September 6, 1946 – 2002; April 8, 2006 | University of Toledo | Toledo, Ohio | Active | (Note: Chapter originated in March 1937, as the Alpha Delta chapter of Alpha Kappa Pi, which merged with ΑΣΦ in 1946.) |
| **Beta Sigma** | September 6, 1946 – August 19, 1981; April 12, 2013 – 2024 | University of Cincinnati | Cincinnati, Ohio | Active | (Note: Chapter originated in June 1937, as the Alpha Epsilon chapter of Alpha Kappa Pi, which merged with ΑΣΦ in 1946. In 1981, the chapter's charter was revoked for low membership. It reformed on May 21, 2011, as a colony.) |
| **Beta Tau** | September 6, 1946 – 1973; November 21, 2010 | Wayne State University | Detroit, Michigan | Active | (Note: This chapter originated on February 12, 1938, as the Alpha Zeta chapter of Alpha Kappa Pi, which merged with ΑΣΦ in 1946. The chapter went inactive in 1973 when its members all graduated without recruiting new members.) |
| Beta Upsilon | September 6, 1946 – 1976 | Milton College | Milton, Wisconsin | Inactive | (Note: Chapter originated on April 20, 1940, as the Alpha Eta chapter of Alpha Kappa Pi, which merged with ΑΣΦ in 1946. The chapter went inactive when the college's enrollment declined in the 1970s.) |
| Beta Phi | September 6, 1946 – 1963 | Wofford College | Spartanburg, South Carolina | Inactive | (Note: Chapter was the reestablishment of the short-lived Alpha Theta chapter of Alpha Kappa Pi, which went inactive during World War II after being established on May 18, 1940.) |
| **Beta Chi** | September 6, 1946 | American University | Washington, D.C. | Active | (Note: This chapter revived the Alpha Iota chapter of Alpha Kappa Pi, which was chartered in May 1940 but went inactive during World War II. Alpha Kappa Pi merged with ΑΣΦ in 1946.) |
| **Beta Psi** | September 6, 1946 | Rensselaer Polytechnic Institute | Troy, New York | Active | (Note: This chapter originated on November 16, 1940, as the Alpha Kappa chapter of Alpha Kappa Pi, which merged with ΑΣΦ in 1946.) |
| **Gamma Alpha** | September 6, 1946 – 1993; October 5, 2019 | Ohio Northern University | Ada, Ohio | Active | (Note: This chapter was a revival of the Alpha Lambda chapter of Alpha Kappa Pi, which was charted on January 16, 1942 and went inactive during World War II. Alpha Kappa Pi merged with ΑΣΦ in 1946.) |
| Gamma Beta | | Carthage College | Kenosha, Wisconsin | Never chartered | (Note: This chapter was never active or chartered as part of Alpha Sigma Phi. It was given a placeholder name to honor the Alpha Mu chapter of Alpha Kappa Pi when the two fraternities merged. Epsilon was chartered on April 18, 1942, and closed in 1943.) |
| **Gamma Gamma** | September 6, 1946 – 1972; April 23, 2016 | University of Connecticut | Storrs, Connecticut | Active | (Note: This chapter originated in 1943 as the Alpha Nu chapter of Alpha Kappa Pi, which merged with ΑΣΦ in 1946. It closed in 1972 after the university interpreted Title IX to mean that single-sex fraternities could no longer be provided with on-campus housing.) |
| **Gamma Delta** | April 12, 1949 – June 1994; 2021 | Davis & Elkins College | Elkins, West Virginia | Active | (Note: This chapter formed from Delta Sigma (local), established in 1947.) |
| **Gamma Epsilon** | February 25, 1950 – 1962; April 26, 2003 – 2013; 2020 | University at Buffalo | Buffalo, New York | Active | (Note: This chapter formed from Chi Tau Omicron (local), established in December 1944 at the University of Buffalo as Sigma Chi Sigma (local). In 1962, the university merged into the New York State University system, which did not allow national fraternities. The chapter withdrew and operated as Delta Beta Xi (local), but eventually went inactive.) |
| **Gamma Zeta** | June 3, 1950 – 1954; June 3, 1950 | Bowling Green State University | Bowling Green, Ohio | Active | (Note: Chapter formed from Chi Alpha (local), established in 1947 from a division of the Rover Club. At its 1965 reorganization, the chapter absorbed Delta Lambda (local), established on October 6, 1963.) |
| Gamma Eta | June 2, 1951 – 1962 | Washington University in St. Louis | St. Louis, Missouri | Inactive | |
| **Gamma Theta** | June 7, 1952 – 1959; April 24, 1982 | University of Miami | Coral Gables, Florida | Active | (Note: This chapter formed from Alpha Pi Delta (local), established in 1951.) |
| Gamma Iota | May 7, 1955 – 1970; April 28, 2012 – February 2018 | University of Arizona | Tucson, Arizona | Inactive | (Note: This chapter formed from Alpha Sig Club (local), established in 1954. The fraternity closed the chapter in 2018 for multiple violations of the health and safety policy: In 2017, the chapter at the University of Arizona was banned from campus for hazing that included blindfolding pledges and making them consume alcohol. One fraternity member was arrested for assault for pushing a pledge into a pillar at the fraternity house.) |
| **Gamma Kappa** | April 26, 1956 – 1966; March 28, 2015 | Michigan State University | East Lansing, Michigan | Active | (Note: For its 1997 restoration, this chapter absorbed Phi Sigma Phi's Epsilon Alpha chapter, which had formed in 1991. ΦΣΦ was not a member of the NIC at the time, but joined soon after. NIC rules prohibit direct absorption ("poaching") of member chapters from one fraternity to another.) |
| **Gamma Lambda** | May 1, 1958 | Barton College | Wilson, North Carolina | Active | (Note: This chapter formed from Sigma Alpha (local), established in 1925.) |
| Gamma Mu | May 2, 1960 – 1988 | University of Charleston | Charleston, West Virginia | Inactive | (Note: Chapter formed from Sigma Delta Phi (local), established in 1950.) |
| Gamma Nu | May 28, 1961 – 1971 | California State University, Sacramento | Sacramento, California | Inactive | (Note: This chapter formed from Kappa Sigma Phi (local), established in 1947 as Kappa Sigma Kappa.) |
| Gamma Xi | April 28, 1962 – February 3, 2000 | Widener University | Chester, Pennsylvania | Inactive | (Note: Chapter formed from Lambda Zeta Rho (local), established in March 1961. It lost its charter in 1981 due to property damage, financial irresponsibility, and poor academic performance.) |
| Gamma Omicron | March 8, 1964 – 1975; February 2, 1980 – March 26, 1992 | Tulane University | New Orleans, Louisiana | Inactive | |
| Gamma Pi | December 12, 1964 – 1983; March 29, 1992 – fall 2013 | University of Findlay | Findlay, Ohio | Inactive | (Note: This chapter formed from Alpha Kappa Omega (local), established in 1961.) |
| Gamma Rho | May 22, 1966 – August 1997 | Lycoming College | Williamsport, Pennsylvania | Inactive | (Note: This chapter originated on March 18, 1951 as the Nu chapter of Alpha Gamma Upsilon, which merged into ΑΣΦ in 1965. Nu formed from Beta Kappa Upsilon (local), established in 1950.) |
| Gamma Sigma | May 13, 1966 – 1970 | Detroit Institute of Technology | Detroit, Michigan | Inactive | (Note: This chapter originated on April 12, 1930 as the Gamma chapter of Alpha Gamma Upsilon, which merged into ΑΣΦ in 1966.) |
| Gamma Tau | May 5, 1966 – 1976 | Indiana Institute of Technology | Fort Wayne, Indiana | Inactive | (Note: This chapter originated on May 14, 1932 as the Beta (Second) chapter of Alpha Gamma Upsilon, which merger into ΑΣΦ in 1966.) |
| **Gamma Upsilon** | September 24, 1966 – 1982; January 8, 2016 | Eastern Michigan University | Ypsilanti, Michigan | Active | (Note: This chapter originated on June 6, 1948, as the Iota chapter of Alpha Gamma Upsilon, which merged into ΑΣΦ in 1966.) |
| Gamma Phi | May 28, 1965 – 1986 | Concord University | Athens, West Virginia | Inactive | (Note: This chapter formed as Sigma Delta Phi (local), established in 1964 by former members of Phi Alpha Chi (local) who wanted to affiliated with a national fraternity.) |
| **Gamma Chi** | February 17, 1968 – 2000; 2002 | Indiana University Bloomington | Bloomington, Indiana | Active | (Note: This chapter originated as Sigma Psi (local), established in 1956.) |
| **Gamma Psi** | November 11, 1968 – January 1991; November 12, 2004 | Lawrence Technological University | Southfield, Michigan | Active | (Note: This chapter originated on June 18, 1933 as the Epsilon chapter of Alpha Gamma Upsilon, which merged into ΑΣΦ on November 11, 1967.) |
| **Delta Alpha** | February 3, 1968– late 1990s; April 2025- | Loyola University Chicago | Chicago, Illinois | Active | (Note: This chapter formed from Sigma Delta Phi (local), established in 1958 by ROTC students who were opposed to hazing at existing fraternities.) |
| **Delta Beta** | May 5, 1969 – August 1985; November 4, 2006 | Northern Michigan University | Marquette, Michigan | Active | (Note: This chapter formed from Alpha Sigma (local), established in 1968 to join a national fraternity.) |
| Delta Gamma | October 10, 1970 – 1976 | Tarkio College | Tarkio, Missouri | Inactive | (Note: This chapter formed from Alpha Lambda Sigma (local), established in 1941. The chapter's charter was withdrawn when conditions at the college changed, leading to the loss of its accreditation soon afterward.) |
| **Delta Delta** | November 14, 1970 | Slippery Rock University | Slippery Rock, Pennsylvania | Active | |
| Theta Sigma | November 14, 1970 – 1974 | University of Bridgeport | Bridgeport, Connecticut | Inactive | (Note: This chapter originated as Theta Sigma (local), established on October 4, 1947. It kept its local name as a chapter designator after its merger.) |
| Epsilon Alpha | April 26, 1971 – 1974 | Duquesne University | Pittsburgh, Pennsylvania | Inactive | (Note: This chapter originated as Beta Pi Sigma (local), established in 1938.) |
| **Delta Epsilon** | April 21, 1972 – April 2017; March, 2024 | University of Rio Grande | Rio Grande, Ohio | Active | (Note: This chapter formed from Alpha Tau Delta (local), established in 1929. It went inactive due to low membership.) |
| **Delta Zeta** | March 2, 1978 | University of North Carolina at Charlotte | Charlotte, North Carolina | Active | (Note: This chapter formed from Delta Kappa (local), established in 1975 as a colony of the fraternity.) |
| **Delta Eta** | December 8, 1979 – 1998; 2013 | East Carolina University | Greenville, North Carolina | Active | (Note: This chapter formed from Nu Chi colony, established in 1978.) |
| Delta Theta | November 7, 1980 – May 11, 2011; November 5, 2016 – November 12, 2018 | Radford University | Radford, Virginia | Inactive | (Note: The chapter closed in 2011, for repeated risk management violations and financial issues. It was reformed as a colony in the spring of 2014, becoming rechartered. However, the university suspended the chapter on November 12, 2018, through the fall of 2021, for violating the student code of conduct. The fraternity revoked the chapter's charter on January 8, 2019.) |
| **Delta Iota** | November 15, 1980 | Longwood University | Farmville, Virginia | Active | |
| Delta Kappa | May 23, 1982 – 1985 | Francis Marion University | Florence, South Carolina | Inactive | (Note: This chapter formed from Phi Alpha (local), established in December 1980.) |
| **Delta Lambda** | December 8, 1984 – June 25, 1994; 2024 | Stockton University | Galloway Township, New Jersey | Active | (Note: This chapter formed from Beta Theta (local), established in 1982. The chapter was suspended on December 7, 1993, for violations involving alcohol, underage drinking, and acts of sexual harassment by members. In February 1994, the chapter violated the terms of its suspension by conducting a sub rosa initiation. Its charter was then revoked.) |
| Delta Mu | December 13, 1986 – 1999 | William Paterson University | Wayne, New Jersey | Inactive | (Note: The chapter's charter was withdrawn for financial reasons. It was reformed as a provisional chapter from 2010 to 2012 but never rechartered due to allegations of risk management violations and hazing.) |
| **Delta Nu** | November 21, 1987 | Commonwealth University-Lock Haven | Lock Haven, Pennsylvania | Active | (Note: Chapter was formed at Lock Haven University of Pennsylvania, now Commonwealth University-Lock Haven.) |
| **Delta Xi** | March 26, 1988 – 2002; 2011 | State University of New York at Plattsburgh | Plattsburgh, New York | Active | |
| Delta Omicron | April 9, 1988 – February 3, 1994; April 20, 2013 – May 31, 2026 | Illinois State University | Normal, Illinois | Inactive | (Note: This chapter formed from the Evin Varner Society (local), established in 1986 as an interest group. In 2026, the university revoked its recognition of the chapter and suspended it through 2028.) |
| **Delta Pi** | December 14, 1991 – April 1995; September 14, 2014 | University of Delaware | Newark, Delaware | Active | |
| **Delta Rho** | April 30, 1993 – 2002; August 24, 2004 | Central Michigan University | Mount Pleasant, Michigan | Active | (Note: This chapter formed from Delta Phi Rho (local), established in 1989. The chapter closed in 2022 due to a lack of members.) |
| **Delta Sigma** | October 30, 1992 – 1999; 2020 | Coastal Carolina University | Conway, South Carolina | Active | (Note: The chapter was closed in 1999 for health and safety violations. It was revived as a provisional chapter on February 20, 2019.) |
| **Delta Tau** | October 8, 1994 | Murray State University | Murray, Kentucky | Active | |
| **Delta Upsilon** | September 23, 1995 | Virginia Tech | Blacksburg, Virginia | Active | |
| **Delta Phi** | March 30, 1996 – January 15, 2020 | Grand Valley State University | Allendale, Michigan | Active | |
| **Delta Chi** | April 28, 1996 | Elmhurst University | Elmhurst, Illinois | Active | |
| **Delta Psi** | February 28, 1997 – 1999; April 13, 2019 | Middle Tennessee State University | Murfreesboro, Tennessee | Active | |
| Epsilon Beta | April 4, 1997 – 2013 | Lindenwood University | St. Charles, Missouri | Inactive | (Note: The university closed the chapter in 2013.) |
| Epsilon Gamma | February 21, 1998 – 2014 | University of Southern Indiana | Evansville, Indiana | Inactive | (Note: The chapter formed from Delta Sigma Chi (local), established in 1994. The chapter closed in 2014 due to low membership.) |
| **Epsilon Delta** | May 2, 1998 | University of Maryland, College Park | College Park, Maryland | Active | |
| **Epsilon Epsilon** | April 9, 1999 – October 2, 2001; February 3, 2018 | Commonwealth University-Bloomsburg | Bloomsburg, Pennsylvania | Active | (Note: The chapter was formed at Bloomsburg University of Pennsylvania, now Commonwealth University-Bloomsburg. The chapter was suspended in 2001 after losing its university recognition for violating alcohol policies. The national fraternity revoked the chapter's charter in 2002. It reformed as a provisional chapter on April 1, 2017.) |
| Epsilon Zeta | April 30, 1999 – March 13, 2008 | Penn State Altoona | Logan Township, Pennsylvania | Inactive | (Note: The national fraternity revoked the chapter's charter for risk management violations.) |
| **Epsilon Eta** | October 15, 1999 – spring 2016; 2019 | Salisbury University | Salisbury, Maryland | Active | (Note: The chapter was suspended in 2016 for risk management violations. It was reestablished as a provisional chapter on April 22, 2017, and was later rechartered.) |
| **Epsilon Theta** | November 11, 2001 | Otterbein University | Westerville, Ohio | Active | |
| **Epsilon Iota** | November 16, 2001 – May 2007; November 18, 2017 | Western Michigan University | Kalamazoo, Michigan | Active | (Note: In November 2006, the university revoked the chapter's house. This led to a period of low membership recruiting and the chapter going inactive in May 2007.) |
| **Epsilon Kappa** | April 26, 2002 | Albright College | Reading, Pennsylvania | Active | |
| **Epsilon Lambda** | October 11, 2002 | University of Hartford | West Hartford, Connecticut | Active | (Note: Chapter formed from Kappa Psi Omega (local), established in October 1999.) |
| Epsilon Mu | December 7, 2002 – June 12, 2019 | Bentley University | Waltham, Massachusetts | Inactive | (Note: The university suspended the chapter during the 2018-2019 academic year for code of conduct violations. At the same time, the chapter was in financial delinquency with the national fraternity. As a result, the chapter was closed.) |
| **Epsilon Nu** | May 3, 2003 | Binghamton University | Vestal, New York | Active | |
| **Epsilon Xi** | May 3, 2003 | McDaniel College | Westminster, Maryland | Active | |
| **Epsilon Omicron** | April 17, 2004 – December 3, 2007; September 9, 2017 | Missouri Western State University | St. Joseph, Missouri | Active | |
| **Epsilon Pi** | October 8, 2005 | Miami University | Oxford, Ohio | Active | |
| **Epsilon Rho** | January 28, 2006 | Appalachian State University | Boone, North Carolina | Active | |
| **Epsilon Sigma** | February 3, 2007 – 20xx ?; 2015 | University of Akron | Akron, Ohio | Active | |
| Epsilon Tau | February 2, 2008 – May 20, 2013 | University of Virginia's College at Wise | Wise, Virginia | Inactive | (Note: The chapter was closed due to financial debts.) |
| **Epsilon Upsilon** | April 5, 2008 | Clemson University | Clemson, South Carolina | Active | |
| **Epsilon Phi** | August 21, 2010 | Sonoma State University | Rohnert Park, California | Active | |
| **Epsilon Chi** | September 11, 2010 | Capital University | Bexley, Ohio | Active | |
| **Epsilon Psi** | January 22, 2011 | California State University, Chico | Chico, California | Active | |
| **Zeta Alpha** | January 22, 2011 | Seton Hall University | South Orange, New Jersey | Active | |
| **Zeta Beta** | November 18, 2011 | Arizona State University | Tempe, Arizona | Active | |
| **Zeta Gamma** | November 20, 2011 | University of California, Davis | Davis, California | Active | |
| **Zeta Delta** | November 19, 2011 – September 9, 2019; August 23, 2021 – March 12, 2026 | Augusta University | Augusta, Georgia | Inactive | (Note: Alpha Sigma Phi withdrew its recognition of the Augusta University chapter in July 2019. However, the chapter continued to operate independently until September 2019, when its members returned the charter.) |
| **Zeta Epsilon** | April 12, 2012 | Colorado State University | Fort Collins, Colorado | Active | |
| **Zeta Zeta** | April 28, 2012 | Northwood University | Midland, Michigan | Active | |
| **Zeta Eta** | April 21, 2012 | Georgia Tech | Atlanta, Georgia | Active | |
| **Zeta Theta** | August 28, 2012 | University of North Carolina at Asheville | Asheville, North Carolina | Active | |
| Zeta Iota | February 2, 2013 – 2018 | University at Albany, SUNY | Albany, New York | Inactive | |
| **Zeta Kappa** | February 2, 2013 | University of Wisconsin–Whitewater | Whitewater, Wisconsin | Active | |
| **Zeta Lambda** | May 4, 2013 | San Francisco State University | San Francisco, California | Active | |
| **Zeta Mu** | April 20, 2013 | California State University, Fresno | Fresno, California | Active | |
| Zeta Nu | March 3, 2013 – 2015 | Montclair State University | Montclair, New Jersey | Inactive | |
| **Zeta Xi** | June 1, 2013 | Keene State College | Keene, New Hampshire | Active | |
| **Zeta Omicron** | February 8, 2014 – January 24, 2023; 2025 | University of South Florida | Tampa, Florida | Active | (Note: The university suspended the chapter for hazing in 2023.) |
| **Zeta Pi** | February 22, 2014 | Salem State University | Salem, Massachusetts | Active | |
| **Zeta Rho** | March 29, 2014 – March 12, 2026 | George Mason University | Fairfax, Virginia | Inactive | |
| Zeta Sigma | September 11, 2014 – 2022 | Indiana University South Bend | South Bend, Indiana | Inactive | |
| **Zeta Tau** | May 3, 2014 | James Madison University | Harrisonburg, Virginia | Active | |
| **Zeta Upsilon** | September 20, 2014 – March 12, 2026 | University of Virginia | Charlottesville, Virginia | Inactive | |
| **Zeta Phi** | September 12, 2015 | University of Michigan–Flint | Flint, Michigan | Active | |
| Zeta Chi | May 1, 2015 – spring 2023 | State University of New York at Oneonta | Oneonta, New York | Inactive | |
| **Zeta Psi** | April 29, 2017 | Auburn University | Auburn, Alabama | Active | |
| Eta Alpha | April 30, 2016 | Oklahoma State University | Stillwater, Oklahoma | Inactive | |
| Eta Beta | November 21, 2015 – 2024 | San Jose State University | San Jose, California. | Inactive | |
| Eta Gamma | December 12, 2015 - 2026 | Southern Illinois University Carbondale | Carbondale, Illinois | Inactive | |
| Eta Delta | | Texas Tech University | Lubbock, Texas | Never chartered | (Note: This provisional chapter was installed on April 26, 2014, but was closed before being chartered in the fall of 2014 due to risk management concerns.) |
| Eta Epsilon | | University of California, Irvine | Irvine, California | Never chartered | **(Note: This provisional chapter operated from 2014 to 2018, but was never chartered.)** |
| Eta Zeta | September 8, 2018 – 2022 | University of Central Arkansas | Conway, Arkansas | Inactive | |
| **Eta Eta** | August 29, 2015 – April 2018 | University of Texas at Austin | Austin, Texas | Provisional | (Note: Chapter was suspended in 2019 due to recruitment, financial, and housing concerns. It was reestablished in the fall of 2023 as a provisional chapter.) |
| **Eta Theta** | November 4, 2017 – November 4, 2019 | University of Texas at San Antonio | San Antonio, Texas | Provisional | (Note: The chapter was closed in 2019 for financial delinquency. It was reestablished as a provisional chapter in the fall of 2023.) |
| **Eta Iota** | April 27, 2019 | Western Carolina University | Cullowhee, North Carolina | Active | |
| **Eta Kappa** | April 25, 2015 – Fall 2021; April, 2025- | University of North Carolina at Chapel Hill | Chapel Hill, North Carolina | Active | (Note: Chapter was closed for violating the university's code of conduct.) |
| **Eta Lambda** | January 15, 2015 | Oakland University | Rochester, Michigan | Active | |
| **Eta Mu** | August 27, 2016 – 2020 | Georgia Southern University | Statesboro, Georgia | Active | |
| Eta Nu | 2015–2024 | McGill University | Montreal, Quebec, Canada | Inactive | |
| **Eta Xi** | April 23, 2016 | University of Colorado Colorado Springs | Colorado Springs, Colorado | Active | |
| **Eta Omicron** | October 10, 2015 | Towson University | Towson, Maryland | Active | |
| Eta Pi | | Stephen F. Austin State University | Nacogdoches, Texas | Never chartered | (Note: This provisional chapter operated from December 2014 to the winter of 2016, but went inactive before being chartered due to recruitment struggles.) |
| Eta Rho | April 19, 2015 – January 2017 | Cameron University | Lawton, Oklahoma | Inactive | (Note: Chapter was closed for financial delinquency.) |
| **Eta Sigma** | October 8, 2016 | Kent State University | Kent, Ohio | Active | |
| Eta Tau | | Bridgewater State University | Bridgewater, Massachusetts | Never chartered | (Note: This provisional chapter operated between July 12, 2015 and May 2017, but was closed before being chartered due to low membership) |
| **Eta Upsilon** | December 5, 2015 | University of North Carolina at Pembroke | Pembroke, North Carolina | Active | |
| Eta Phi | March 28, 2020 – 2024 | Northern Kentucky University | Highland Heights, Kentucky | Inactive | |
| **Eta Chi** | June 6, 2016 | Morehead State University | Morehead, Kentucky | Active | |
| Eta Psi | January 9, 2016 – 2025 | Wright State University | Fairborn, Ohio | Inactive | |
| Theta Alpha | | University of Stirling | Stirling, Scotland | Never chartered | (Note: This provisional chapter operated between 2015 and 2017, but was never chartered.) |
| Theta Beta | | Averett University | Danville, Virginia | Never chartered | (Note: This provisional chapter operated between November 3, 2015 and June 2019, but was never chartered.) |
| Theta Gamma | April 14, 2018 – Spring 2025 | University of Mary Washington | Fredericksburg, Virginia | Inactive | (Note: The chapter closed due to low membership.) |
| **Theta Delta** | April 29, 2017 | University of Houston | Houston, Texas | Active | |
| Theta Epsilon | | University of Montana | Missoula, Montana | Never chartered | (Note: This provisional chapter was installed on November 15, 2015, but was closed in November 2017 before being chartered.) |
| **Theta Zeta** | March 17, 2018 | Utah State University | Logan, Utah | Active | |
| **Theta Eta** | February 25, 2017 | University of Nevada, Reno | Reno, Nevada | Active | |
| Theta Theta | May 6, 2017 | University of Oregon | Eugene, Oregon | Inactive | |
| **Theta Iota** | September 9, 2017 | Texas State University | San Marcos, Texas | Active | |
| **Theta Kappa** | April 22, 2017 | University of North Carolina Wilmington | Wilmington, North Carolina | Active | |
| Theta Lambda | | Washington State University | Pullman, Washington | Never chartered | (Note: This provisional chapter operated between 2016 and 2019, but went inactive before being chartered.) |
| **Theta Mu** | November 17, 2018 | Northern Illinois University | DeKalb, Illinois | Active | |
| Theta Nu | | University of Missouri–St. Louis | St. Louis, Missouri | Never chartered | (Note: This provisional chapter was formed in 2016 but went inactive before being chartered.) |
| **Theta Xi** | November 9, 2019 | University of Maine | Orono, Maine | Active | |
| **Theta Omicron** | April 28, 2018 | University of Wisconsin–Milwaukee | Milwaukee, Wisconsin | Active | |
| **Theta Pi** | March 2, 2019 - November 9, 2026 | University of Kansas | Lawrence, Kansas | Inactive | |
| **Theta Rho** | October 21, 2017 | Texas A&M University | College Station, Texas | Active | |
| **Theta Tau** | October 7, 2017 | Quinnipiac University | Hamden, Connecticut | Active | |
| Theta Upsilon | | University of Nebraska at Kearney | Kearney, Nebraska | Never chartered | (Note: This provisional chapter operated between November 2016 and June 2017, but went inactive before being chartered.) |
| **Theta Phi** | November 9, 2019 | University of West Georgia | Carrollton, Georgia | Active | |
| **Theta Chi** | April 21, 2018 | Northern Arizona University | Flagstaff, Arizona | Active | |
| **Theta Psi** | February 24, 2018 | Ramapo College | Mahwah, New Jersey | Active | |
| **Iota Alpha** | October 2025 | California State University, Bakersfield | Bakersfield, California | Provisional | (Note: This provisional chapter was established on April 1, 2017, but was closed in 2022 before being chartered.) |
| Iota Beta | | St. Mary's University, Texas | San Antonio, Texas | Never chartered | (Note: This provisional chapter was started in 2017 but went inactive before being chartered.) |
| Iota Gamma | April 26, 2019 | Boston University | Boston, Massachusetts | Inactive | |
| Iota Delta | | Indiana State University | Terre Haute, Indiana | Inactive | (Note: This chapter was established as a provisional chapter in 2017.) |
| **Iota Epsilon** | September 28, 2019 | Montana State University | Bozeman, Montana | Active | |
| Iota Zeta | December 8, 2020 - April 22, 2026 | University of Alaska Anchorage | Anchorage, Alaska | Inactive | |
| Iota Eta | 2019–2023 | University of Toronto | Toronto, Ontario, Canada | Inactive | |
| **Iota Theta** | September 22, 2018 | East Tennessee State University | Johnson City, Tennessee | Active | |
| **Iota Iota** | October 20, 2018 | University of North Dakota | Grand Forks, North Dakota | Active | |
| **Iota Kappa** | 2022 | Western Illinois University | Macomb, Illinois | Active | |
| **Iota Lambda** | 2021 | Eastern Washington University | Cheney, Washington | Active | |
| **Iota Mu** | September 7, 2019 | California State University, San Marcos | San Marcos, California | Active | |
| Iota Nu | September 8, 2019 – 2024 | University of Nevada, Las Vegas | Las Vegas, Nevada | Inactive | |
| **Iota Xi** | March 28, 2020 | Missouri State University | Springfield, Missouri | Active | |
| Iota Omicron | | Piedmont University | Demorest, Georgia | Never chartered | (Note: This provisional chapter was formed on January 31, 2019, but went inactive before being chartered.) |
| **Iota Pi** | 2021 | Kansas State University | Manhattan, Kansas | Active | |
| **Iota Rho** | 2023 | Texas A&M University–Kingsville | Kingsville, Texas | Active | |
| **Iota Sigma** | | University of Central Oklahoma | Edmond, Oklahoma | Provisional | **(Note: This provisional chapter operated from January 29, 2019 to 2020, but went inactive before being chartered.)** |
| **Iota Tau** | 2021 | University of Wyoming | Laramie, Wyoming | Active | |
| Iota Upsilon | | University of Western Ontario | London, Ontario, Canada | Never chartered | (Note: This provisional chapter was formed in 2019 but went inactive before being chartered.) |
| **Iota Phi** | October 28, 2023 | Texas A&M University–Corpus Christi | Corpus Christi, Texas | Active | |
| **Iota Chi** | April 10, 2021 | California Polytechnic State University, San Luis Obispo | San Luis Obispo, California | Active | (Note: This provisional chapter was installed on January 31, 2019.) |
| **Iota Psi** | December 8, 2020 | Farmingdale State College | East Farmingdale, New York | Active | (Note: This provisional chapter was installed on January 27, 2019.) |
| **Kappa Alpha** | September 30, 2023 | Rhode Island College | Providence, Rhode Island | Active | |
| Kappa Beta | March 2, 2024 - 2005 | University of Hawaiʻi at Mānoa | Honolulu, Hawaii | Inactive | |
| **Kappa Gamma** | April 24, 2021 | Indiana University–Purdue University Indianapolis | Indianapolis, Indiana | Active | (Note: In 2024, IUPUI split into Indiana University Indianapolis and Purdue University in Indianapolis.) |
| Kappa Delta | April 30, 2022 – 2024 | George Washington University | Washington, D.C. | Inactive | |
| **Kappa Epsilon** | September 30, 2023 | University of South Carolina | Columbia, South Carolina | Active | |
| **Kappa Zeta** | October 19, 2025 | College of William & Mary | Williamsburg, Virginia | Active | |
| **Kappa Eta** | October 2, 2021 | University of Alabama at Birmingham | Birmingham, Alabama | Active | |
| **Kappa Theta** | October 21, 2021 | Angelo State University | San Angelo, Texas | Active | |
| **Kappa Iota** | October 28, 2023 | California State University, Monterey Bay | Seaside, California | Active | |
| **Kappa Kappa** | October 25, 2025 | University of South Carolina Upstate | Valley Falls, South Carolina | Active | (Note: This provisional chapter was formed in 2020.) |
| Kappa Lambda | | Arkansas Tech University | Russellville, Arkansas | Never chartered | (Note: This provisional chapter operated from March 13, 2021 to March 2023, but was never chartered.) |
| **Kappa Mu** | | New Mexico State University | Las Cruces, New Mexico | Provisional | |
| **Kappa Nu** | October 18, 2025 | University of Pittsburgh | Pittsburgh, Pennsylvania | Active | |
| **Kappa Xi** | | Sam Houston State University | Huntsville, Texas | Provisional | (Note: This provisional chapter was formed in 2021.) |
| **Kappa Pi** | September 16, 2023 - November 19, 2026 | University of North Alabama | Florence, Alabama | Inactive | |
| **Kappa Omicron** | October 7, 2023 | University of North Florida | Jacksonville, Florida | Active | |
| Kappa Rho | | University of Minnesota Duluth | Duluth, Minnesota | Never chartered | (Note: This provisional chapter was formed in 2021 but went inactive before being chartered.) |
| **Kappa Sigma** | | University of Texas at El Paso | El Paso, Texas | Provisional | |
| **Kappa Tau** | | University of Idaho | Moscow, Idaho | Provisional | |
| **Kappa Upsilon** | | Nicholls State University | Thibodaux, Louisiana | Provisional | |
| **Kappa Phi** | | University of Georgia | Athens, Georgia | Provisional | |
| **Kappa Chi** | | Rowan University | Glassboro, New Jersey | Provisional | |
| **Kappa Psi** | | Temple University | Philadelphia, Pennsylvania | Provisional | |
| **Lambda Alpha** | | California State University, Stanislaus | Turlock, California | Provisional | |
| **Lambda Beta** | | Arkansas State University | Jonesboro, Arkansas | Provisional | |
| **Lambda Gamma** | | State University of New York at Cortland | Cortland, New York | Provisional | |
| **Lambda Delta** | | Florida International University | Westchester, Florida | Provisional | (Note: Colonh formed in October, 2025.) |
| **Lambda Epsilon** | | San Diego State University | San Diego, California | Provisional | |
| **Lambda Iota** | | Florida Institute of Technology | Melbourne, Florida | Provisional | |
| **Lambda Kappa** | | University of Wisconsin - La Crosse | La Crosse, Wisconsin | Provisional | |
| **Lambda Mu** | | High Point University | High Point, North Carolina | Provisional | |
