= List of Alpha Sigma Phi members =

Alpha Sigma Phi is an intercollegiate men's social fraternity. The following is a list of notable Alpha Sigma Phi members.

== Academia ==
Name	Chapter	Class	Notability	Ref.
Rohit Bakshi	Iota		Professor of Neurology and Radiology at Harvard Medical School	
John Blackburn	Omicron		Administrator who helped with the racial integration of the University of Alabama	
Reinhold Niebuhr	Alpha	1913	Protestant theologian and professor at Union Theological Seminary	
Cyrus Northrop	Alpha		2nd President of the University of Minnesota	
A. Kenneth Pye	Gamma Epsilon		President of Southern Methodist University	
Harvey G. Stenger	Iota	1979	Seventh president of Binghamton University	
Francis Amasa Walker	Gamma		President of MIT, superintendent of the 1870 and 1880 censuses, and Commissioner of Indian Affairs	
Andrew Dickson White	Alpha	1850	First president of Cornell University	

== Business ==
Name	Chapter	Class	Notability	Ref.
Allan Alcorn	Nu	1967	Co-founder of Atari Corporation; engineered PONG	
Ralph F. Burns	Epsilon	1932	Executive secretary of Alpha Sigma Phi from 1936 to 1976	
Warren Buffett	Omicron	1948	Chairman and CEO of Berkshire Hathaway	
Chuck Feeney	Iota	1953	Co-founder of DFS Galleria and Duty Free Shoppers Group	
J. Frederic Kernochan	Alpha		President of Arminius Chemical Company and attorney	
Andrew McKelvey	Alpha Nu	1954	Chairman and CEO of Monster Worldwide, Inc.	
Jon Mittelhauser	Eta	1990	Co-founder of Netscape Communications and founding father of the Web browser	
Ratan Tata	Iota	1962	Chairman and CEO of Tata Group	

== Entertainment ==
Name	Chapter	Class	Notability	Ref.
Henry Brandon	Tau		Character actor	
Ted Cassidy	Beta Nu	1939	Actor who played Lurch on The Addams Family	
David Gregory	Beta Chi	1992	Meet the Press presenter	
Steve Hartman	Gamma Zeta	1982	CBS correspondent on 60 Minutes	
Robert Loggia	Alpha Sigma	1951	Actor who played Mr. MacMillan in Big	
Vincent Price	Alpha	1930	Actor and director known as the "Father of Horror Film"	
Robert Relyea	Alpha Zeta		Film producer	
Rick Santelli	Eta	1974	CNBC commentator and derivatives trader	
Willard Scott	Beta Chi	1946	Weatherman on The Today Show	
Ed Walker	Beta Chi		Radio personality	

== Government ==
Name	Chapter and year	Class	Notability	Ref.
William John Cooper	Nu		US Commissioner of Education	
C. Everett Koop	Alpha Eta	1934	Surgeon General of the United States	
Ross Swimmer	Alpha Alpha	1961	Special Trustee at the US Bureau of Indian Affairs	
Francis Amasa Walker	Gamma		Superintendent of the 1870 and 1880 censuses, Commissioner of Indian Affairs, and president of MIT	

== Law ==
Name	Chapter	Class	Notability	Ref.
Andrew G. Douglas	Beta Rho	1951	Justice of the Supreme Court of Ohio	
Skip Humphrey	Beta Chi	1962	Minnesota Attorney General	
J. Frederic Kernochan	Alpha		Attorney and president of Arminius Chemical Company	

== Literature and journalism ==
Name	Chapter	Class	Notability	Ref.
Clarence Winthrop Bowen	Alpha		journalist for the New York Herald Tribune, author, and newspaper publisher	
Harold T. P. Hayes	Beta Mu	1944	Editor of Esquire Magazine	
Richard F. Janssen	Gamma Eta		Journalist who received a Gerald Loeb Award	

== Military ==
Name	Chapter and year	Class	Notability	Ref.
Herman F. Kramer	Xi		United States Army General	
George L. Mabry Jr.	Alpha Psi		United States Army General	

== Politics ==
Name	Chapter	Class	Notability	Ref.
James Allen	Alpha Iota		U.S. Senate	
Samuel Bodman	Iota	1957	US Secretary of Energy	
Howard Buffett	Xi		U.S. House of Representatives	
Lawrence Eagleburger	Kappa		U.S. Secretary of State and Deputy Assistant Secretary of Defense	
Arthur Flemming	Epsilon	1924	US Secretary of Health, Education, and Welfare	
John Kasich	Zeta	1973	U.S. House of Representatives and Governor of Ohio	
Horace R. Kornegay	Beta Mu	1942	U.S. House of Representatives and chairman of the Tobacco Institute	
Charles G. Oakman	Theta	1924	U.S. House of Representatives	
Eric Swalwell	Epsilon Delta	2001	U.S. House of Representatives	
Frank Wolf	Upsilon	1960	U.S. House of Representatives	

== Sports ==
Name	Chapter	Class	Notability	Ref.
Frank Beamer	Delta Upsilon (honorary)	2016	Virginia Tech Head Football Coach	
Bradford G. Corbett	Alpha Sigma	1958	Owner of the Texas Rangers (1974–1980)	
Fitz Eugene Dixon Jr.	Gamma Xi	1973	Owner of the Philadelphia 76ers (1976–1981)	
Rich Duwelius	Zeta	1975	Gold medalist in volleyball at the 1984 Summer Olympics	
Ray Eliot	Eta	1938	Head football coach at the University of Illinois	
Bob Houbregs	Mu		Professional basketball player	
Bob Howsam	Pi	1938	President and General Manager of the Cincinnati Reds	
Billy "White Shoes" Johnson	Gamma XI	1971	American football player	
Press Maravich	Gamma Delta	1941	Head basketball coach at the University of Louisville, North Carolina State University, and Clemson University	
John Henry Mills	Beta Mu		Professional football player	
Bennie Oosterbaan	Theta	1927	All-American football player and University of Michigan head football coach	
Robin Reed	Psi	1926	Wrestling gold medalist at the 1924 Summer Olympics	
Tom Watson	Tau	1971	Professional golfer and eight-time Major winner	

== See also ==
- List of Alpha Sigma Phi chapters
