= Sigma Delta Rho =

Defunct American collegiate fraternity

- ΣΔΡ
- Founded: January 8, 1921; 105 years ago Miami University of Ohio
- Type: Social
- Former affiliation: NIC
- Status: Defunct
- Defunct date: 1943
- Successor: Alpha Kappa Pi (1935), or scattered
- Scope: National
- Member badge
- Colors: Silver, Purple and Gold
- Publication: The Griffin
- Chapters: 9
- Headquarters: Oxford, Ohio; United States

Sigma Delta Rho (ΣΔΡ) was a small American's men's fraternity founded on January 8, 1921 at Miami University of Ohio, the fifth general social fraternity to be formed at that school. It "disintegrated" in the spring of 1935 due to pressures of the Great Depression and "absence of strong leadership." About half its chapters were absorbed into other fraternities.

== History ==
Sigma Delta Rho was founded as Delta Sigma Rho at Miami University in Oxford, Ohio, on January 8, 1921. The university recognized the new local fraternity under that name. However, it was discovered that there was a previously existing national recognition society of the same name; thus, when the fraternity made plans to become national several months later, it changed its name Sigma Delta Rho by switching the order of the first two letters.

The fraternity was incorporated as Sigma Delta Rho in the State of Ohio. Its five founders were Herbert Ansteatt, Arthur Baker, Roe Bush, Albert O. Grooms, and Gilbert L. Stout.

The fraternity joined the National Interfraternity Conference as a junior member in 1930. By that time, it had 466 members, seven collegiate chapters, and four alumni chapters. Three of its collegiate chapters owned houses.

Five of its eventual nine chapters were placed in Ohio.

=== Demise ===
Disagreement developed among its chapters as to the policies of the fraternity. Additionally, financial problems caused by the Great Depression and a lack of strong leadership all led to a downfall in the spring of 1935.

The national fraternity Alpha Kappa Pi absorbed the chapters at Franklin and Marshall, Toledo, and Cincinnati. This national later merged with Alpha Sigma Phi. The Illinois chapter banded together with a faltering chapter of Beta Psi to form a new chapter of Pi Kappa Phi. The Tri-State chapter eventually joined Sigma Phi Epsilon. The others "gradually disappeared."

== Symbols ==
Sigma Delta Rho's badge was a cross paté formé purpure (formed of purple) with edges or (gold), connected by four chains of five links each; this was superimposed with a mascle (a lozenge-shaped device), or (also gold), enclosing the letters Σ, Δ and Ρ on a field of argent (silver).

E. Helen Butterfield designed the fraternity's coat of arms in 1925. It featured a shield with three crosses and a single chevron. Above the shield is a griffon with spread wings. Below the shield is a banner with the fraternity's motto.

Sigma Delta Rho's motto was the Greek word όίηοδομώμεν or "We Build". The fraternity's colors were silver, purple, and gold. Its publication was The Griffin.

== Chapters ==
The fraternity chartered nine chapters formed between 1921 and 1934.

Chapter	Charter date and range	Institution	Location	Status	Ref.
Alpha	January 8, 1921 – 1935	Miami University	Oxford, Ohio	Inactive	(Note: Chapter may have formed at the end of 1920; Baird's Manual notes that year for the fraternity's predecessor organization, while accepting the date January 8, 1921, for its establishment under the latter name. Upon the fraternity's dissolution, this chapter went inactive.)
Beta	1922–1932	Ohio State University	Columbus, Ohio	Inactive	
Gamma	1924–1935	University of Toledo	Toledo, Ohio	Merged (ΑΣΦ)	(Note: Chapter formed from Zeta Omicron (local), established in 1921. It became the Alpha Delta chapter of Alpha Kappa Pi in 1937, and eventually Alpha Sigma Phi's Beta Rho chapter.)
Delta	1926–1935	University of Illinois	Urbana, Illinois	Withdrew (ΠΚΦ)	(Note: Chapter formed from the Oneoga Club (local), established in 1922. After the fraternity's dissolution in 1935, it withdrew and revived the Upsilon chapter of Pi Kappa Phi.)
Epsilon	1926–1935	University of Cincinnati	Cincinnati, Ohio	Merged (ΑΣΦ)	(Note: Chapter formed from Kappa Alpha Chi (local), established in 1925. After the fraternity's dissolution, it became the Alpha Epsilon chapter of Alpha Kappa Pi in 1937, and eventually Alpha Sigma Phi's Beta Sigma chapter.)
Zeta	1928–1943	Ohio University	Athens, Ohio	Withdrew (local)	(Note: Chapter formed from Delta Chi Alpha (local), established in 1927. It operated as a local fraternity after the national closed, finally going inactive during World War II.)
Eta	1929–1935	Franklin & Marshall College	Lancaster, Pennsylvania	Merged (ΑΣΦ)	(Note: Chapter formed from the Torch Club (local), established in 1927. It later absorbed another local group called Alpha Pi. After the fraternity's dissolution, it became the Alpha Gamma chapter of Alpha Kappa Pi in 1936, eventually Alpha Sigma Phi's Beta Pi chapter.)
Theta	1934–1935	Hillsdale College	Hillsdale, Michigan	Inactive	(Note: Chapter formed from Beta Alpha Delta (local), established in 1924. It went inactive with the closure of the fraternity.)
Iota	1934–1936	Tri-State College	Angola, Indiana	Withdrew, (local)	(Note: Chapter formed from Phi Sigma Chi (local), established in 1927. After the fraternity's dissolution, it reverted to a local fraternity called Phi Sigma Chi. In 1949, it became a chapter of Alpha Gamma Upsilon.)

== See also ==
- List of social fraternities
