= Ralph F. Burns =

American fraternity executive (1912–1993)

- Born: Ralph Frank Burns; May 12, 1912; New Castle, Pennsylvania, US
- Died: September 25, 1993 (aged 81); Pittsburgh, Pennsylvania, US
- Burial place: Youngstown, Ohio, US
- Education: Ohio Wesleyan University, 1935
- Occupation: Fraternity executive secretary
- Years active: 1936–1976
- Employer: Alpha Sigma Phi

Ralph Frank Burns (May 12, 1912 – September 25, 1993) was an American fraternity executive who served as executive secretary of Alpha Sigma Phi from 1936 to 1976. He is referred to as "Mr. Alpha Sigma Phi" for his lifelong dedication to the organization. Burns was also a charter member and officer of the National Interfraternity Conference and president of the Fraternity Executives Association.

== Early life ==
Burns was born in New Castle, Pennsylvania, on May 12, 1912. His parents were Louise Amanda (née Snyder) and James Andrew Burns. His family moved to Youngstown, Ohio, where Burns attended high school.

Burns enrolled at Ohio Wesleyan University in 1931. While there, he joined the Epsilon chapter of Alpha Sigma Phi on February 21, 1932, and served as the chapter's president and recruitment director. He graduated from the university in 1935 with a degree in social work.

== Career ==
After graduation, Burns worked at a social agency in Cleveland, Ohio. In 1936, he was named executive secretary of Alpha Sigma Phi, a position he held for 40 years. During his tenure, he oversaw significant growth and change within the fraternity, including mergers with Phi Pi Phi in 1939, Alpha Kappa Pi in 1946, and Alpha Gamma Upsilon in 1966.

During World War II, when most chapters closed and membership dues declined, Burns took a full-time job on August 1, 1943, as the executive manager of the New York City Life Underwriters Association, while continuing to volunteer his time to the fraternity at night. After the war, Burns resigned from the Life Underwriters Assocation in 1945, and returned to Alpha Sigma Phi on a full-time basis. In 1946, Burns relocated the Alpha Sigma Phi national headquarters from New York City to Delaware, Ohio, near his alma mater, in 1946.

Burns served as president of the Fraternity Executives Association from 1952 to 1953, president of the College Fraternity Editors Association from 1962 to 1963, and recording secretary and charter member of the National Interfraternity Conference. He was a member of the American Alumni Council and served on the Bicentennial Commission of the American College Fraternity.

He retired as executive secretary emeritus of Alpha Sigma Phi in August 1976. At the time, he was the longest-serving fraternity executive in the United States. For his 40 years of service, Burns is remembered as "Mr. Alpha Sigma Phi." In his retirement, he volunteered as the secretary of the Alpha Sigma Phi Educational Foundation.

== Awards and honors ==
Burns received numerous awards during and after his career, including:

- Delta Beta Xi Award for service to Alpha Sigma Phi (1938)
- Omicron Delta Kappa honorary membership, Ohio Wesleyan University chapter (1960)
- Order of the Interfraternity Service Award from Lambda Chi Alpha (1974)
- Distinguished Merit Award from Alpha Sigma Phi for professional accomplishment (1976)
- Gold Medal Award, the highest award of the National Interfraternity Conference (1976)
- The National Fraternity Executives Association held a Ralph Burns Roast (1976)
- Paul Harris Fellow from Rotary International (1976)
- Evin C. Varner Jr. Distinguished Service Award for lifetime dedication to Alpha Sigma Phi (1980)
- Named an honorary "Third Founder" of Alpha Sigma Phi by the Grand Council and established the Ralph F. Burns Fund in his honor (c. 1980)
- Outstanding Community Service Award from the Delaware Rotary Club (1981)
- National Symposiach of the Year from the National Order of Symposiachs of America (1984)
- Distinguished Service Award from the Fraternity Executives Association (1985)
- A plaque dedicated to Burns was installed in the JAYwalk pedestrian mall of Ohio Wesleyan University (1994)
- Alpha Sigma Phi established the Ralph Burns New Member Program, now called the Ralph F. Burns Leadership Institute, to continue his legacy (1997)
- The Alpha Sigma Phi named its new national headquarters in Carmel, Indiana, in his honor (2002)

== Personal life ==
Burns married Ann May Heidman of Cleveland, Ohio on September 13, 1937, in Youngstown, Ohio. The couple initially lived in New York City, but later moved to 162 Cottswold Drive in Delaware, Ohio. They had two sons: Bruce and Jonathan.

Burns served as president of the Delaware Rotary Club, vice president and secretary of the Delaware chapter of the Order of Symposiachs, president of the Delaware Boosters Club, and volunteered with the Boy Scouts and the Hayes Athletic Boosters. He chaired the local United Way campaign and served as vice president of Grady Memorial Hospital's board of trustees. He was also board chairman for Asbury United Methodist Church and served on Delaware's City Charter Review Commission.

On September 25, 1993, Burns died of a heart attack at age 81 while attending a joint Grand Council and Educational Foundation planning retreat in Pittsburgh, Pennsylvania. He had just concluded his remarks to the group, explaining his choice to remain active with the fraternity for 61 years. He was buried in Youngstown, Ohio.
