= Anthony Wayne Institute =

Commercial college in Fort Wayne Indiana (c. 1916–1933)

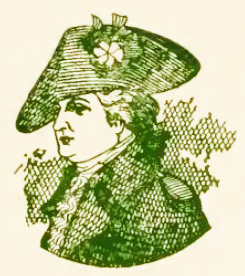
- Anthony Wayne Institute's trademark
- Type: Private
- Active: c. 1916–1933
- Address: 226 West Wayne Street, Fort Wayne, Indiana, United States
- Campus: Urban
- Colors: Purple and White
- Nickname: Hoisers

Anthony Wayne Institute was a commercial college located in Fort Wayne, Indiana, United States. Its students included men and women. The school closed in 1933 because of the Great Depression.

== History ==
The Anthony Wayne Institute was a two-year commercial school that focused on business education for men and women. The school was named for General Anthony Wayne, the founder of Fort Wayne. The institute advertised that it was "a different school" that was "founded upon modern methods". Students were required to be high school graduates, although the institute welcomed teachers and former teachers. Opened around 1916, its Instruction was provided through traditional daytime classes, night school, and by correspondence.

The institute was located in the Gauntt Building in Fort Wayne, Indiana for several years. Under the leadership of president G. W. Gardner, the institute moved to a new location in the fall of 1918. That year, enrollment was limited to 100 students to provide more attention to each student.

Unable to survive the Great Depression, the college closed in 1933. A shareholder advertised the discounted sale of institute stock at a discount in July 1935. In November 1937, the Wayne Paper Box and Printing Corporation filed a suit for the appointment of a receiver for the Anthony Wayne Institute which owned the company $315; a newspaper reported that the institute was "insolvent and unable to pay in full".

In January 1941, Ted B. Erick, Thomas V. Happer, Paul A. Hultin, and agent Thomas V. Happer incorporated the Anthony Wayne Institute, Inc. with plans to operate a commercial school in Fort Wayne. However, there is no evidence that the institute was revived.

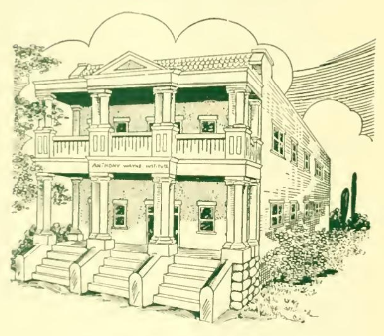
Anthony Wayne Institute's 226 West Wayne Street location, c. 1919

== Campus ==
The Anthony Wayne Institute's campus was located in a 7,000 square feet (650 m^{2}) building at 226 West Wayne Street in Fort Wayne, Indiana. This new building featured terrazzo floors, mahogany woodwork, and an indirect lighting system. Its first floor included the president's office and classrooms. The second floor included more classrooms and an assembly room that could accommodate the entire student body for convocation and lectures. The campus also included a gymnasium on Clay Street.

The institute was in a residential location, near transportation lines, the public library, the Y.M.C.A., and the Y.W.C.A.

== Academics ==
For the 1919 to 1920 academic year, the institute academic departments included Advertising Managers, Auditors, Billing Clerks, Bookkeepers, Chief Accountants, Chief Clerks, Collection Clerks, Comptometer Managers, Correspondents, Office Managers, Private Secretaries, Sales Managers, and Stenographers. However, the business course was the school's main program, providing instruction in advanced bookkeeping, banking and finance, business correspondence, business penmanship, commercial law, corporate accounting, general office work, mechanical accounting, practical bookkeeping, and the use of office equipment.

The institute's second most popular curriculum was its stenographic course. The institute also offered an accounting course that prepared students for the C.P.A. exam. The school claimed that its banking course prepared students for executive positions in banking or other professional fields. Its business psychology program included accounting, analyzing yourself, developing character, executive talks, finance, mental ability, organization, physical fitness, selling, management, utilizing time, working with others, and producing, buying, and shipping.

The institute's Normal Department offered a one or two-year commercial teacher's training course, qualifying students to teach the commercial sciences at high schools and colleges. In 1918, the institute added French, Spanish, public speaking, psychology, and oratory to its offerings.

The institute provided both onsite classes and extension courses for home study. The latter was promoted for students with financial limitations and as an option for potential students who could not stop their full-time jobs to attend college. Extension courses in 1919 included bookkeeping, stenography, accounting and auditing, business executive, private secretary, banking, and the world of business.

=== Faculty ===
In August 1919, E. J. Goddard took charge of the institute's residence department and taught classes in commercial law. Goddard graduated from the Wharton School at the University of Pennsylvania and was the former manager of Brown's Business College in Bridgeport, Connecticut. Also joining the faculty that semester, Bernard Gould was in charge of the comptometry department. In July 1921, Walter L. Cochran was hired as Goddard's replacement. He was a graduate of and former lecture at Columbia University.

== Student life ==
Anthony Wayne Institute offered a variety of activities for its students, including social functions, clubs, and bowling teams. Dances for students included live music provided by a jazz orchestra. Students elected class officers and created a yearbook.

The institute was the location of the founding chapter of Alpha Gamma Upsilon social fraternity, started by students Herbert R. Carter, Homer H. Iden, Alfred C. Keoneke, and Dale R. Odneal in 1922. The fraternity had a chapter house and operated until the institute closed in 1933.

There was also an Anthony Wayne Alumni Association, organized in November 1919. The Alumni Association and students held joint social functions.

== Athletics ==
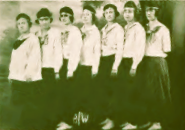
Anthony Wayne Institute girls basketball team 1919-1920

Anthony Wayne Institute had competitive men's and women's basketball teams. The teams, known as the Hoisers, organized in October 1919 and chose purple and white as their colors. Its coach was R. K. Waters. By January 1929, the school played against schools such as Battle Creek College in Michigan. That year, its team was dubbed "sharp-shooters".

In the early 1920s, the college was part of a Commercial Basketball League, playing corporate teams formed in Fort Wayne. In 1921, the institute's team was the league champion and won the city's championship.
