= Alpha Gamma Upsilon =

Defunct American collegiate fraternity

- ΑΓΥ
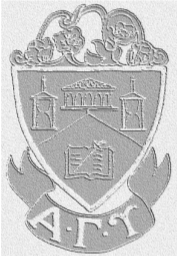
- Founded: October 10, 1922; 104 years ago Anthony Wayne Institute
- Type: Social
- Affiliation: Independent
- Status: Merged
- Merge date: May 1965
- Successor: Alpha Sigma Phi and scattered
- Scope: National
- Motto: ΑΔΕΛΦΟΣ ΑΝΔΡΙ ΠΑΡΕΙΗ
- Colors: Black and Gold
- Flower: Pink Rose
- Publication: Links; Forum/Fraternity Forum
- Chapters: 14
- Headquarters: Royal Oak, Michigan; United States

Alpha Gamma Upsilon (ΑΓΥ) was a social fraternity founded in 1922 at Anthony Wayne Institute in Fort Wayne, Indiana. In May 1965, it was absorbed in part by Alpha Sigma Phi (ΑΣΦ).

== History ==
Alpha Gamma Upsilon was founded by Herbert R. Carter, Homer H. Iden, Alfred C Koeneke, and Dale R. Odneal at Anthony Wayne Institute in Fort Wayne, Indiana. It was incorporated in Indiana on October 10, 1922. Its purpose was:

to promote friendship, comradeship, and mutual understanding among its members; to encourage excellence in scholarship; to develop good character; to uphold the ideals of the colleges where its chapters were located; and to foster the highest ideals of Christian conduct and good citizenship.

The Alpha chapter closed in 1933 when the Anthony Wayne Institute closed because of the Great Depression. Chapter growth had stalled by 1951. Several chapters closed by mid-decade. The fraternity's national headquarters was in Detroit before moving to Royal Oak, Michigan.

In 1962, the healthy Kappa chapter at Defiance College went local and sought membership in a larger national. Under these pressures, the faculty advisor for Alpha Gamma Upsilon's Lycoming College chapter, Dr. Otto Sonder (an alumnus of Alpha Sigma Phi) who was knowledgeable of the discussion of a possible merger, introduced the National Officers of Alpha Gamma Upsilon to Alpha Sigma Phi's Executive Secretary, Ralph F. Burns.

In 1965, the Alpha Gamma Upsilon chapter at Lycoming was installed as the Gamma Rho chapter of Alpha Sigma Phi. Chapters at Detroit Institute of Technology, Indiana Institute of Technology, and Eastern Michigan University followed suit in 1966. Those four chapters were, under the terms of the merger agreement, considered chartered in Alpha Sigma Phi as of their chartering dates in Alpha Gamma Upsilon, which were 1951, 1930, 1932, and 1948, respectively. The merger was completed when Lawrence Institute of Technology was re-accredited and its 55-year-old Alpha Gamma Upsilon chapter chartered in 1967. Thus, Alpha Sigma Phi gained five chapters from the merger.

Unlike Alpha Sigma Phi's mergers with Phi Pi Phi and Alpha Kappa Pi, there was no blanket invitation to Alpha Gamma Upsilon alumni to be initiated into Alpha Sigma Phi. However, some of the more prominent leaders of Alpha Gamma Upsilon did so. Alpha Gamma Upsilon's Delta chapter at General Motors Institute did not participate in the merger but sought and received a charter from Phi Gamma Delta. Alpha Gamma Upsilon's Lambda chapter at Trine University sought and received a charter from Sigma Phi Epsilon.

== Symbols ==
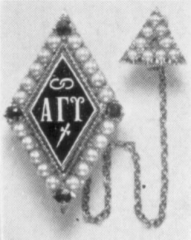
Alpha Gamma Upsilon Pin

The motto of Alpha Gamma Upsilon was ΑΔΕΛΦΟΣ ΑΝΔΡΙ ΠΑΡΕΙΗ. The fraternity's colors were black and gold. Its flower was the pink rose.

Its badge was a diamond-shaped shield of black enamel that was with the Greek letters ΑΓΥ. In the area above these letters appear two links; below is a miniature dagger. The standard badge was 3/8" x 5/8". The badge was in gold and had the option of being bordered with emeralds, pears, or rubies. Smaller badges were presented to mothers, wives, sisters, and fiancees of fraternity members.

== Activities ==
The fraternity celebrated Omega Day on February 1 and Founders' Day on October 10. It presented several awards to the chapters annually. It presented the Alumni Cup to the chapter that best met the ideals of the fraternity. Its Founders' Award was presented for service to the community and college. Its Counselors' Cup was given for excellence in educating pledges. The fraternity also gave the Regents' Award for the greatest improvement in chapter management, pledge instruction, and public relations. The President's Plaque was presented to the chapter that excelled in the field of chapter journalism.

Alpha Gamma Upsilon published The Pledge Manual and The Procedures Manual. Its magazine,The Links, was established in 1924 and was published annually in May. The Forum, its monthly bulletin, was published to keep information flowing from the chapters to the alumni and to bring briefs of national organization activities; it was discontinued in 1943 and restarted 1950 as The Fraternity Forum.

== Auxiliary ==
In 1947, a women's auxiliary to Alpha Gamma Upsilon named Alpha Alpha Pi was created and made open to mothers, wives, fiancées, sisters, and daughters of active and alumni brothers.

== Chapters ==
Following is a list of Alpha Gamma Upsilon chapters. Inactive chapters and institutions are in italics:

Chapter	Charter date and range	Institution	Location	Status	Ref.
Alpha	October 10, 1922 – ≤September 1933	Anthony Wayne Institute	Fort Wayne, Indiana	Inactive	(Note: The Wayne Institute closed in the fall of 1933.)
Old Beta	December 12, 1927 – December 1928	Universal Institute		Reassigned	(Note: The chapter's charter was rescinded by the national fraternity because granting a charter to an unaccredited college was considered an error.)
Gamma	April 12, 1930 – May 13, 1966	Detroit Institute of Technology	Detroit, Michigan	Merged (ΑΣΦ)	(Note: Became the Gamma Sigma chapter of Alpha Sigma Phi.)
Delta	January 16, 1932 – November 7, 1964	General Motors Institute	Flint, Michigan	Withdrew (local)	(Note: Formed a local, then became Alpha Gamma chapter of Phi Gamma Delta.)
Second Beta	May 14, 1932 – May 5, 1966	Indiana Technical College	Fort Wayne, Indiana	Merged (ΑΣΦ)	(Note: Became the Gamma Tau chapter of Alpha Sigma Phi.)
Epsilon	June 18, 1933 – November 11, 1967	Lawrence Institute of Technology	Southfield, Michigan	Merged (ΑΣΦ)	(Note: Became the Gamma Psi chapter of Alpha Sigma Phi.)
Zeta	March 25, 1934 – 1957	University of Detroit	Detroit, Michigan	Inactive	(Note: Chapter became Zeta Omega, then Phi Sigma Kappa.)
Eta	Spring 1947–Fall 1962	Wayne State University	Detroit, Michigan	Withdrew (local)	(Note: Chapter withdre and became Epsilon Tau Alpha. It then merged and became the Kappa Alpha Tau chapter of Phi Epsilon Pi.)
Theta	May 15, 1948 – 1956	University of Toledo	Toledo, Ohio	Inactive	
Iota	June 6, 1948 – September 24, 1966	Michigan State Normal College	Ypsilanti, Michigan	Merged (ΑΣΦ)	(Note: Became the Gamma Upsilon chapter of Alpha Sigma Phi.)
Kappa	April 24, 1949 – May 1962	Defiance College	Defiance, Ohio	Merged (ΤΚΕ)	(Note: Chapter formed from Alpha Kappa (local), established in 1921. It become the Iota Phi chapter of Tau Kappa Epsilon.)
Lambda	May 8, 1949 – May 4, 1968	Tri-State College	Angola, Indiana	Merged (ΣΦΕ)	(Note: Chapter formed from Phi Sigma Chi (local), established in 1927. It became the Indiana Theta chapter of Sigma Phi Epsilon.)
Mu	1951–1957	Rider College	Lawrence Township, New Jersey	Inactive	(Note: Chapter formed from Kappa Phi (local), established in 1929.)
Nu	March 18, 1951 – May 22, 1965	Lycoming College	Williamsport, Pennsylvania	Merged (ΑΣΦ)	(Note: Chapter formed from Beta Kappa Upsilon (local), established in 1950. It became the Gamma Rho chapter of Alpha Sigma Phi.)

== See also ==
- List of social fraternities
