= Alpha Sigma Phi =

North American collegiate fraternity

- ΑΣΦ
- Founded: December 6, 1845; 180 years ago Yale College
- Type: Social
- Affiliation: FFC
- Former affiliation: NIC
- Status: Active
- Scope: International
- Motto: "To better the man"
- Pillars: Silence, Charity, Purity, Honor, Patriotism
- Colors: Cardinal Red; Stone Grey
- Symbol: Phoenix
- Flag
- Flower: Cardinal rose and yellow tea rose
- Publication: The Tomahawk
- Chapters: 181
- Members: 98,000+ lifetime
- Nickname: Alpha Sig, "The Old Gal"
- Headquarters: 710 Adams Street; Carmel, Indiana 46032; United States
- Website: www.alphasig.org

Alpha Sigma Phi (ΑΣΦ), commonly known as A Sig, is an intercollegiate men's social fraternity. Founded in 1845 at Yale University in New Haven, Connecticut, it is the tenth oldest social fraternity in the United States.

Alpha Sigma Phi has 181 chapters with over 8,000 undergraduate students as active members and well over 72,000 living members.

It is a member of the Fraternity Forward Coalition (FFC) and a former member of the North American Interfraternity Conference (NIC).

== History ==
=== Founding ===
Alpha Sigma Phi was founded by three men at Yale College in 1845 as a secret sophomore society composed of many of the school's poets, athletes, and scholars. Upon rising through the ranks of the school, members shared membership with Alpha Sigma Phi in their sophomore year, one of three fraternities in their junior year and Skull and Bones or Scroll and Key in their senior year.

Louis Manigault

The founders of Alpha Sigma Phi were:

- Louis Manigault – member of a French family that became prosperous through the operation of a South Carolina plantation
- Stephen Ormsby Rhea – the son of John Rhea, a cotton planter of Louisiana who helped make the disputed territory of West Florida part of the U.S. through his involvement in the French and Indian War
- Horace Spangler Weiser – a descendant of Conrad Weiser, a refugee from Europe known for his participation in the French and Indian War and treaty negotiations with Native Americans

Manigault and Rhea met at St. Paul's Preparatory School near Flushing, New York, where both were members of the same literary society and were preparing themselves for admission to Yale. Weiser attended a private school in New Haven, and he met Rhea early in his freshman year, who introduced him to Manigault.

Once at Yale, Manigault and Rhea became members of Yale's Calliopean Literary Society, and Weiser was a member of the Linonian Literary Society. Manigault was very much interested in the class society system at Yale and noted that the class fraternities provided experience for their members and prepared them for competition in literary contests. The sophomore class there had only one society, Kappa Sigma Theta, which displayed an attitude of superiority toward non-fraternity men.

Manigault revealed to his friends Rhea and Weiser a plan for founding another sophomore society. Rhea agreed and enlisted Weiser to become the three founders of Alpha Sigma Phi. Their first official meeting was held in Manigault's room on Chapel Street on December 6, 1845. The constitution and ritual were then written, and the fraternity pin was designed. The first pledge class of fourteen members was initiated on June 24, 1846.

After the birth of Alpha Sigma Phi, an intense rivalry began with Kappa Sigma Theta. This was expressed in their publications, Kappa Sigma Theta's The Yale Banger and Alpha Sigma Phi's The Yale Tomahawk. In 1852, the editors of the Tomahawk were expelled after violating faculty orders to cease publication. However, the rivalry between the organizations continued until 1858, when Kappa Sigma Theta was suppressed by the faculty.

=== Beyond Yale ===
The first expansion effort was to Amherst College in Massachusetts in 1847, but it only lasted about six months, due to faculty opposition. A fragmentary document in the Yale library suggests that Beta was chartered in 1850 at Harvard University but lived a very short life due to a wave of puritanism. The chapter at Harvard was revived in 1911 as Beta, but only survived about twenty years; the charter was withdrawn due to Harvard's anti-fraternity environment. When the Amherst College chapter was restored in 1854, it was designated as either the Gamma or the Delta chapter. (A charter document found in Yale archives shows the latter, but Baird's Manual from its earliest editions and later records of the fraternity refer to it as Gamma.) When the chapter at Marietta College was chartered in 1860, it was given the Delta designation, despite the parent chapter being aware of this discrepancy.

When the Civil War broke out, former Delta chapter presidents William B. Whittlesey and George B. Turner died and willed their possessions and their swords to the chapter, which treasured those mementos until the chapter closed for two decades in the mid-1990s. From 1858 through 1863, the sophomore members of Alpha Sigma Phi were elected in almost equal numbers by the two stronger junior class fraternities, with a smaller number going to the third. In 1864, the mother chapter at Yale was torn by internal dissension. Because less attention was being given to the sophomore class societies, some Alpha Sigma Phi members pledged to Delta Kappa Epsilon, a junior class society, and attempted to turn the control of Alpha Sigma Phi over to Delta Kappa Epsilon. This attempt was thwarted by members of Alpha Sigma Phi who had pledged to the other two junior class societies. A conflict ensued, and the faculty suppressed Alpha Sigma Phi to end the disorder. However, the traditions of Alpha Sigma Phi were carried on by two new sophomore class societies, Delta Beta Xi and Phi Theta Psi. Manigault sought to renew his loyalty and friendship with his brothers of Alpha Sigma Phi and agreed with Rhea and Weiser to consider Delta Beta Xi its true descendant. They were unaware at the time that Delta at Marietta still existed as Alpha Sigma Phi.

The second founders were Wayne Montgomery Musgrave and Edwin Morey Waterbury. Musgrave, a graduate of New York University, Yale, and Harvard, provided the organizational spark that fanned Alpha Sigma Phi into national prominence. Waterbury was an educator and vice-principal of the New York State Normal School at Geneseo from 1873 to 1895. With the inactivation of Delta Beta Xi at Yale, Alpha Sigma Phi was kept alive only at Marietta by Delta. At Yale, in fall 1906, four friends agreed in a conversation over a card game that an organization was needed that was open to all students, instead of representing only the sophomore or junior classes. The four friends were Robert L. Ervin, Benjamin F. Crenshaw, Arthur S. Ely, and Edwin M. Waterbury.

Other members soon joined the group in their mission, the first of which were Fredrick H. Waldron and Wayne M. Musgrave. Ervin knew some of the alumni brothers of Delta at Marietta and asked them to send the first letter to Delta. On March 27, 1907, Ely, Crenshaw, Musgrave, Waldron, and Waterbury traveled to Marietta and were initiated into Alpha Sigma Phi. Upon returning to New Haven, they initiated the other friends they had recruited into the new Alpha chapter at Yale.

Many of the old Alpha members returned to Yale upon hearing the news of the refounding and helped acquire the fraternity's first piece of real estate, the "Tomb", a windowless two-story building. No non-member was allowed entrance. No member could speak of the interior of the building, and were even expected to remain silent while passing by the exterior of the building.

=== Expansion ===
A new national organization was formed at an Alpha Sigma Phi conference at Marietta in 1907, and within a year there were three new chapters: Zeta at Ohio State, Eta at the University of Illinois, and Theta at the University of Michigan. In 1909, Iota was established at Cornell University, and the Kappa chapter was founded at the University of Wisconsin. In 1910, another convention was held with the members of the former chapters at Yale, Amherst and Ohio Wesleyan University, and a delegation from the Yale's Delta Beta Xi fraternity. All of these pledged their loyalty to a restored Alpha Sigma Phi, and soon afterward, the chapters Mu at the University of Washington, Nu at University of California, Berkeley, and Upsilon at the Pennsylvania State University were added.

Alpha Sigma Phi survived World War I fairly easily and even recruited many new members during those years. In the post-war era, Alpha Sigma Phi expanded at the rate of one chapter per year. In 1939, Phi Pi Phi merged with Alpha Sigma Phi, as the Great Depression left that fraternity with only five of its original twenty-one chapters. World War II hit Alpha Sigma Phi hard, with many brothers losing their lives due to the conflict, forcing many chapters to close.

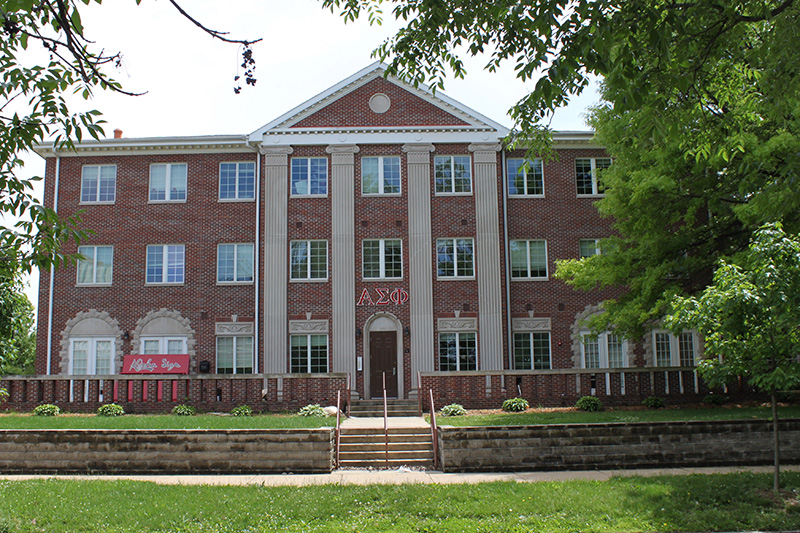
University of Illinois at Urbana-Champaign chapter house

On September 6, 1946, Alpha Kappa Pi merged with Alpha Sigma Phi. Alpha Kappa Pi had never had a national office, but was still a strong fraternity. During the war, they had lost many chapters and realized the need for a more stable national organization. Alpha Sigma Phi expanded again in 1965 by five more chapters when it merged with Alpha Gamma Upsilon. The 1980s found a younger generation of leaders taking the reins of the fraternity. Keeping in mind one of its oldest traditions, being a fraternity run by undergraduates, the leadership and undergraduates began expanding in new directions.

In 2006, Alpha Sigma Phi won the North American Interfraternity Conference's Laurel Wreath Award for the Ralph F. Burns Leadership Institute for new members. In 2016, the fraternity won the Laurel Wreath Award for their educational program "Toastmasters' Lite". The program provides undergraduate brothers the opportunity to learn and practice public speaking skills.

== Symbols ==
Alpha Sigma Phi's motto is Causa Latet Vis Est Notissima or "The cause is hidden, the results well-known". Its values or pillars are Silence, Charity, Purity, Honor, Patriotism. The fraternity's official symbol is the phoenix, as the phoenix rises from the ashes of its old body, signifying the re-founding of the fraternity in the early 1900s. Its colors are cardinal red and stone grey. Its flower is the Cardinal rose and yellow tea rose. Its publication is The Tomahawk.

== Awards ==
=== Grand Senior Presidents Cup ===
First presented at the 1960 Grand Chapter, this award recognizes chapters of the fraternity - one for a chapter at an institution with a large undergraduate population (20,001+ undergraduates), one for a chapter at an institution with a medium undergraduate population (8,501 to 20,000 undergraduates) and one for a chapter with a small undergraduate population (fewer than 8,500 undergraduates) - that have best exemplified the ideals and purpose of the Fraternity. Chapters that score the highest in all areas of the Annual Report are recognized with the Grand Senior President's Cup. This is the highest honor a chapter can receive within Alpha Sigma Phi. The chapter must be in good standing with fraternity headquarters and excel in all aspects of the fraternity's annual report for accreditation.

=== Most Improved Chapter Award ===
The most improved chapter award is given to the chapter that has demonstrated significant improvement from one award period to the next award period.

=== Victor B. Scott Award ===
The Victor B. Scott Award is awarded annually to the chapter whose academic grade point average most greatly exceeds its college or University's all men's average. Brother Victor Scott presented the scholarship plaque for ‘creating an incentive on the part of each chapter of the fraternity to strive for a higher average in scholarship on the campus on which the chapter was located. After the merger with Alpha Sigma Phi, an award was named in his honor for outstanding chapter scholarship. In 2018, grand historian emeritus, Robert Kutz, UC-Berkeley 1967, established an endowment to allow for this award to once again be bestowed.

== Chapters ==
Alpha Sigma Phi has 181 chapters.

== Notable members ==
Alpha Sigma Phi has over 8,000 undergraduate students members and well over 72,000 living members.

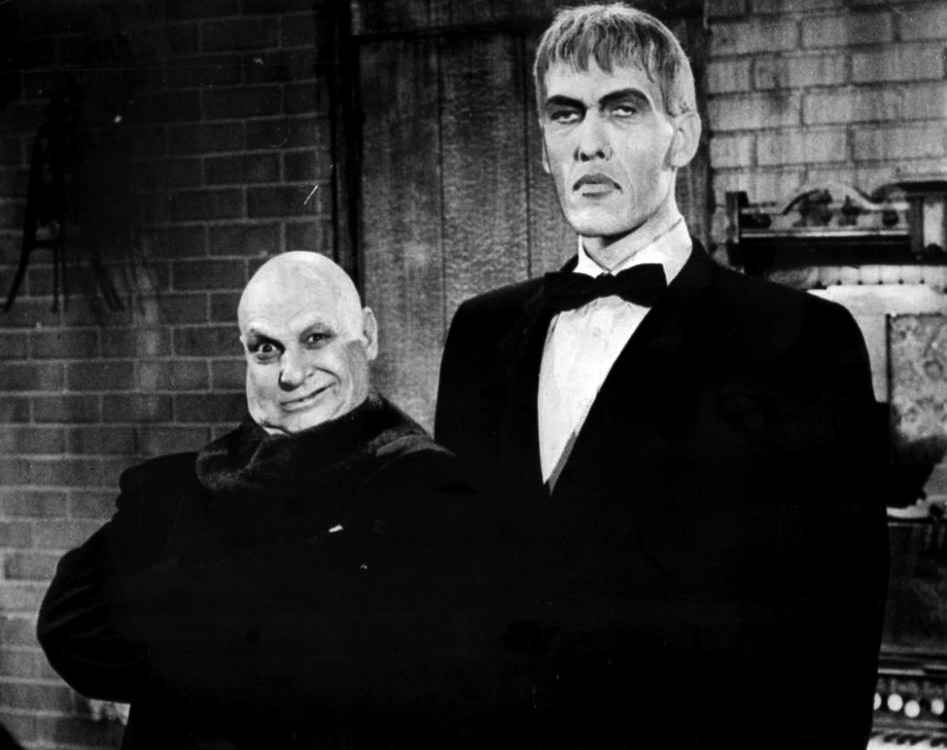
Ted Cassidy, Lurch on The Addams Family

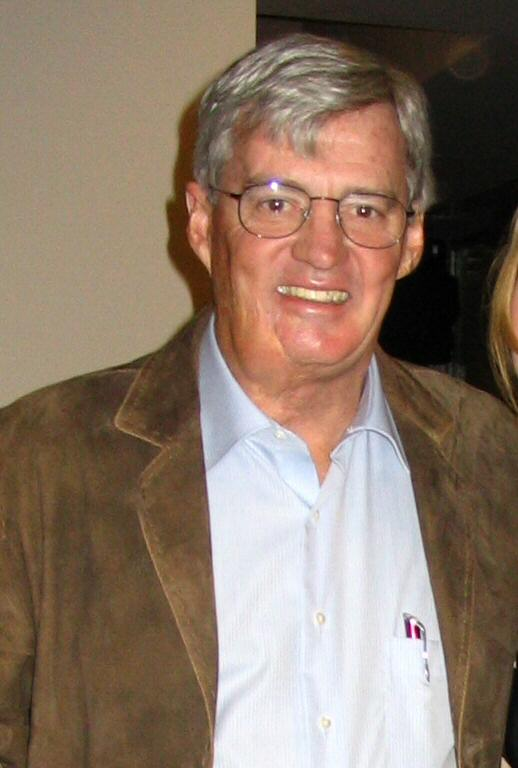
Frank Beamer, Virginia Tech head football coach, 1987–2015

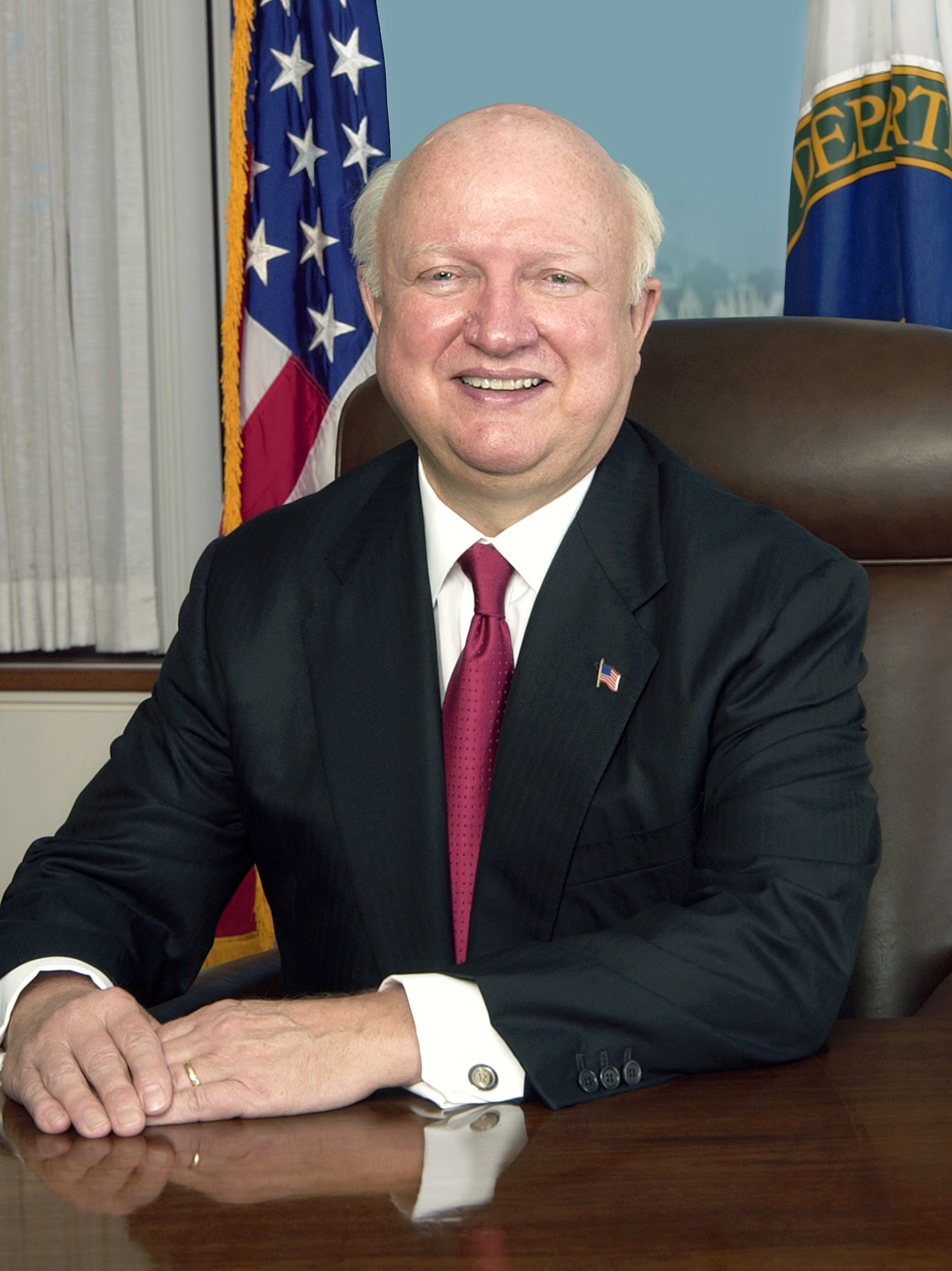
Samuel Bodman, 11th United States Secretary of Energy

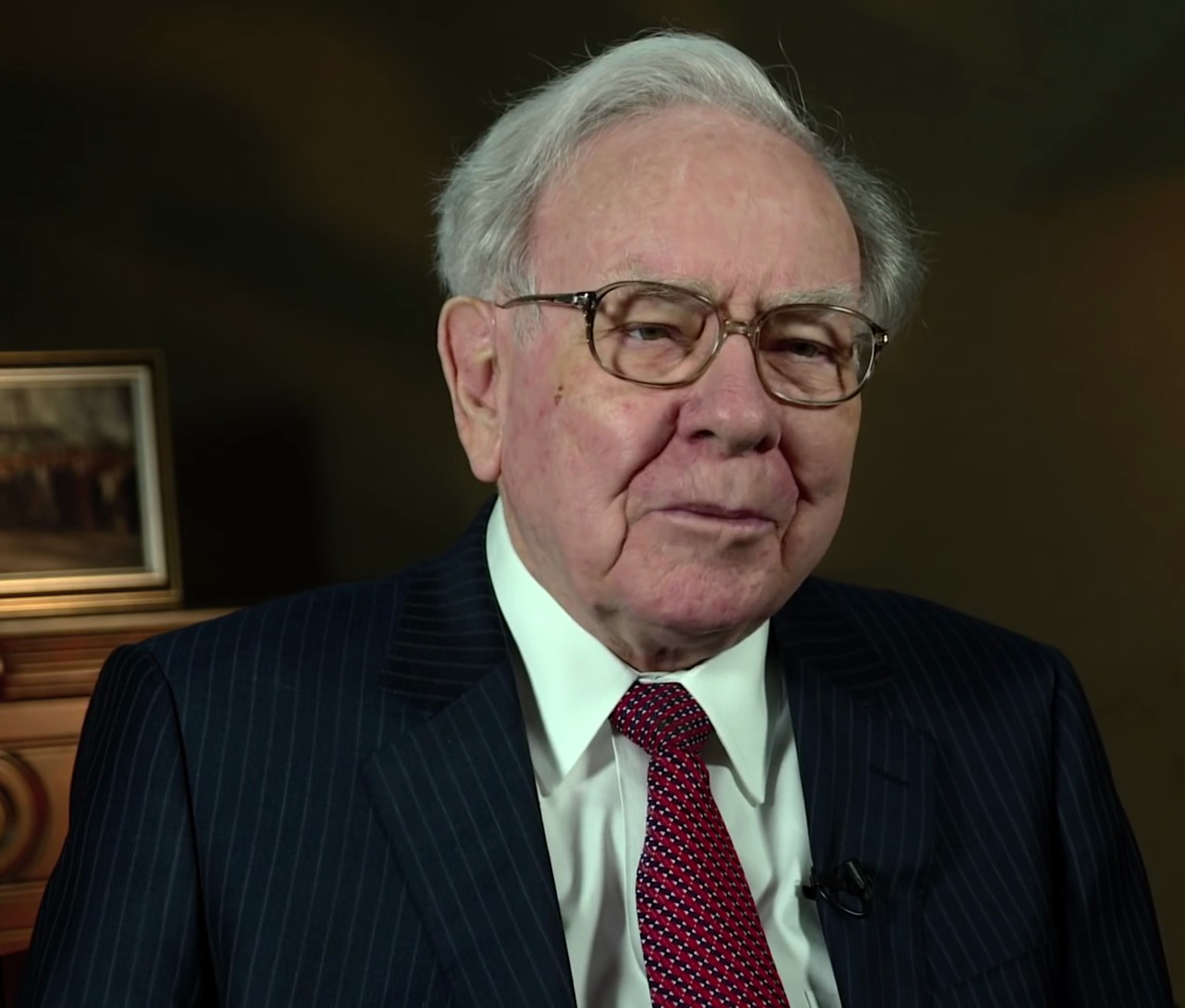
Warren Buffett, chairman and CEO, Berkshire Hathaway. "Oracle of Omaha" and world's sixth wealthiest person

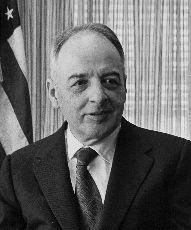
Arthur Flemming, U.S. Secretary of Health, Education, and Welfare

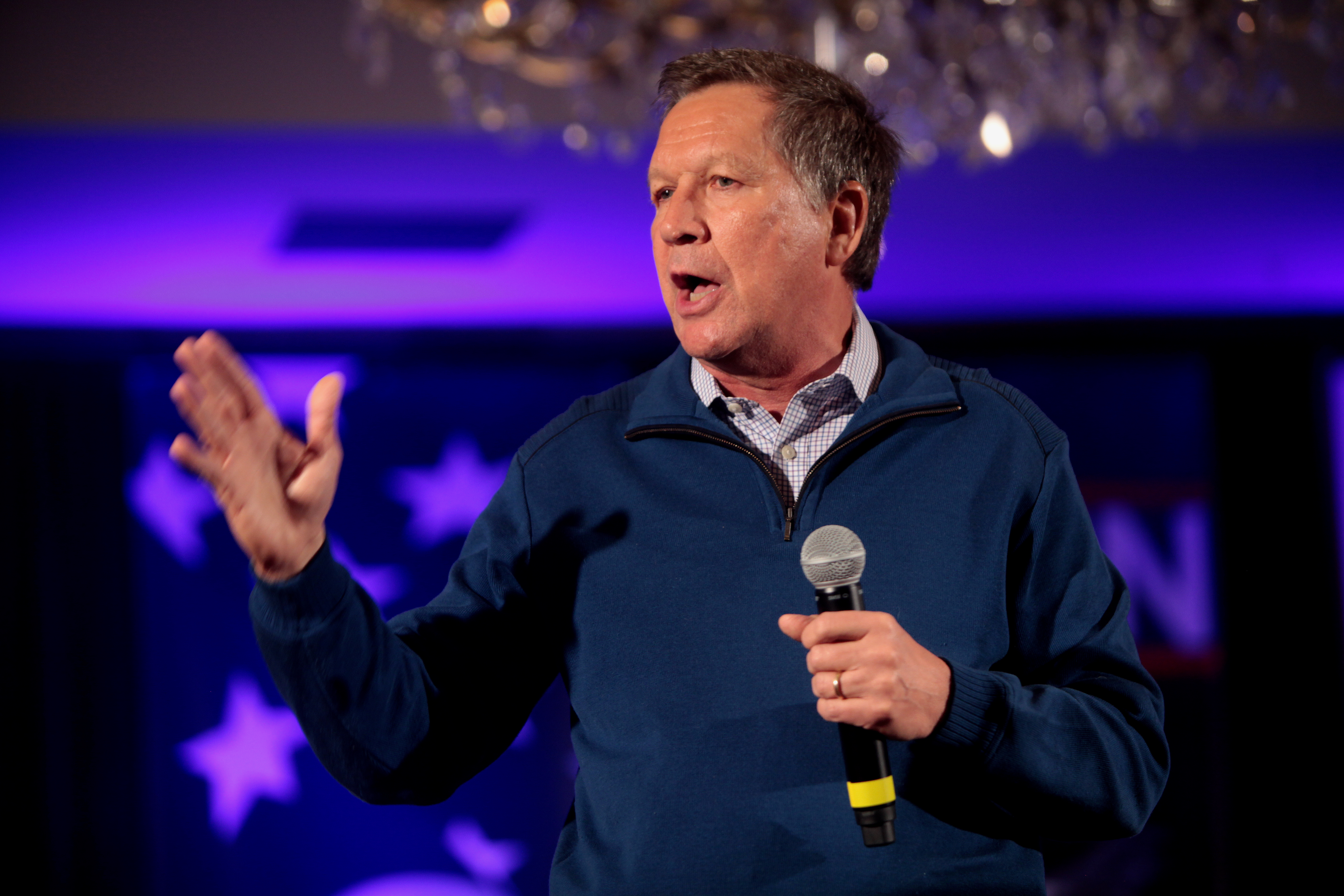
John Kasich, 69th Governor of Ohio

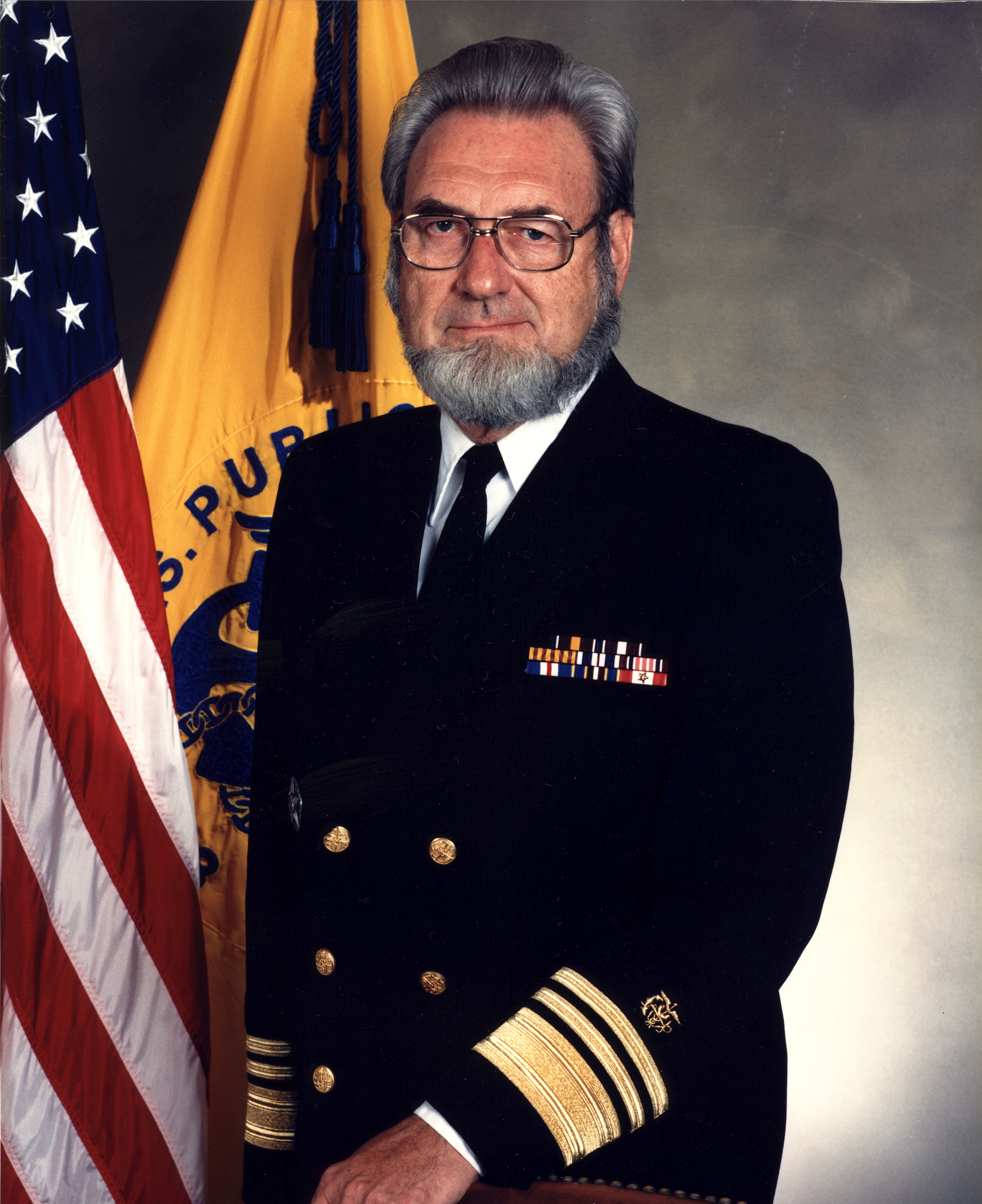
C. Everett Koop, Surgeon General of the United States under President Ronald Reagan

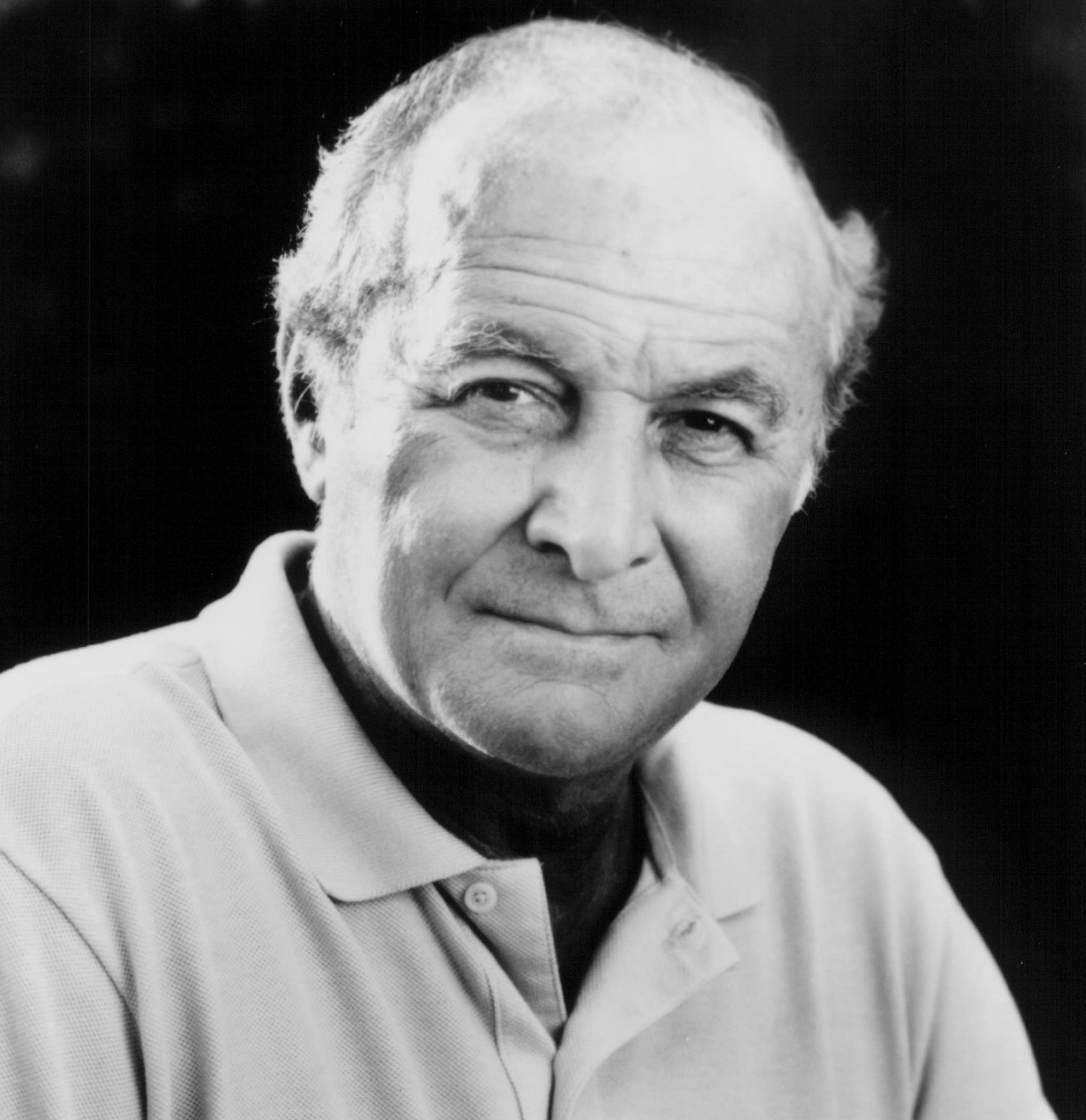
Robert Loggia, Academy Award nominee

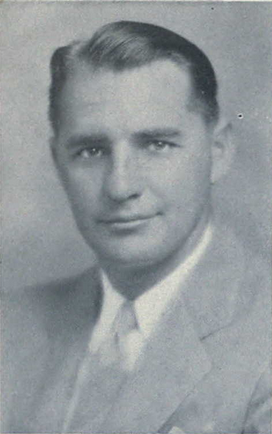
Bennie Oosterbaan, three-time College Football All-American

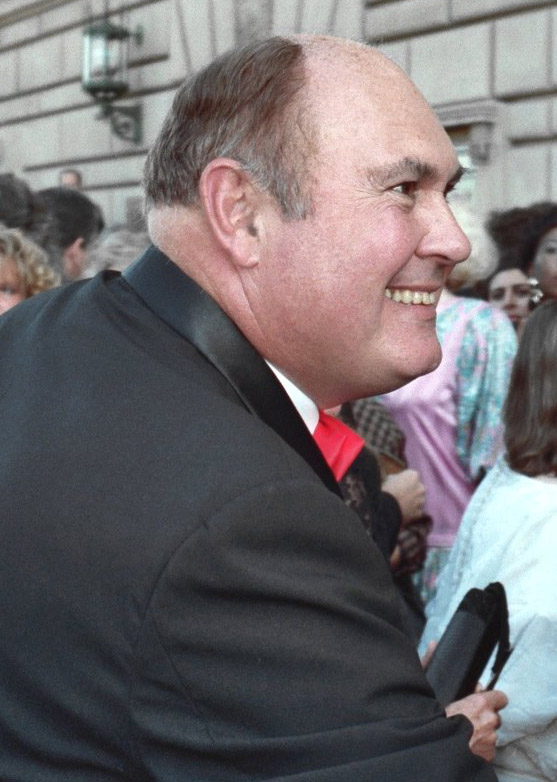
Willard Scott, weatherman on The Today Show, creator and original portrayer of Ronald McDonald

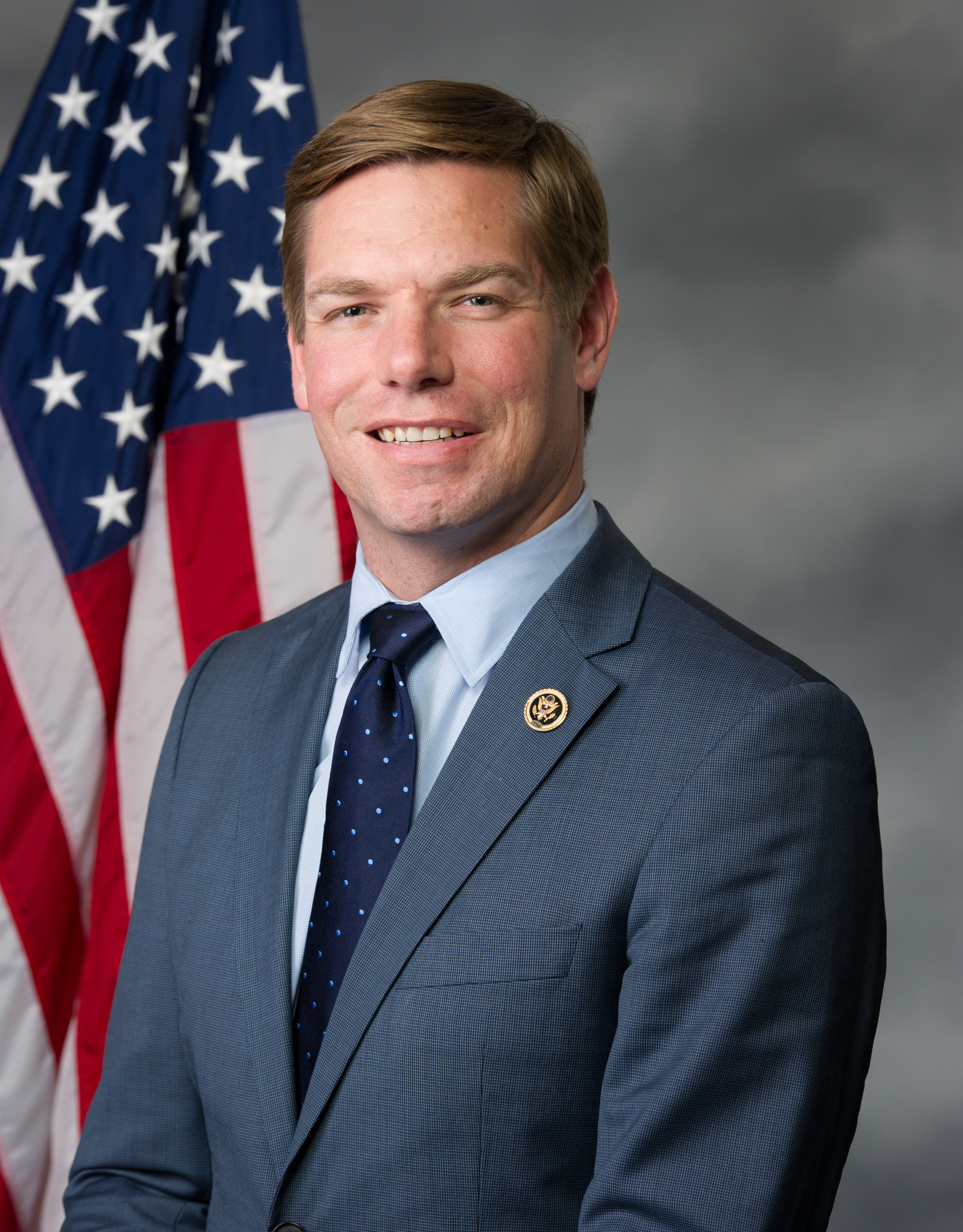
Eric Swalwell, Member of the U.S. House of Representatives

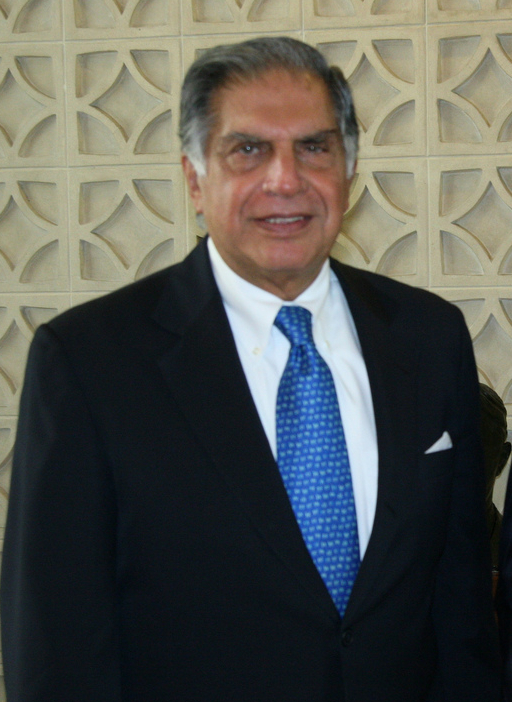
Ratan Tata, chairman of Tata Group, India's largest conglomerate

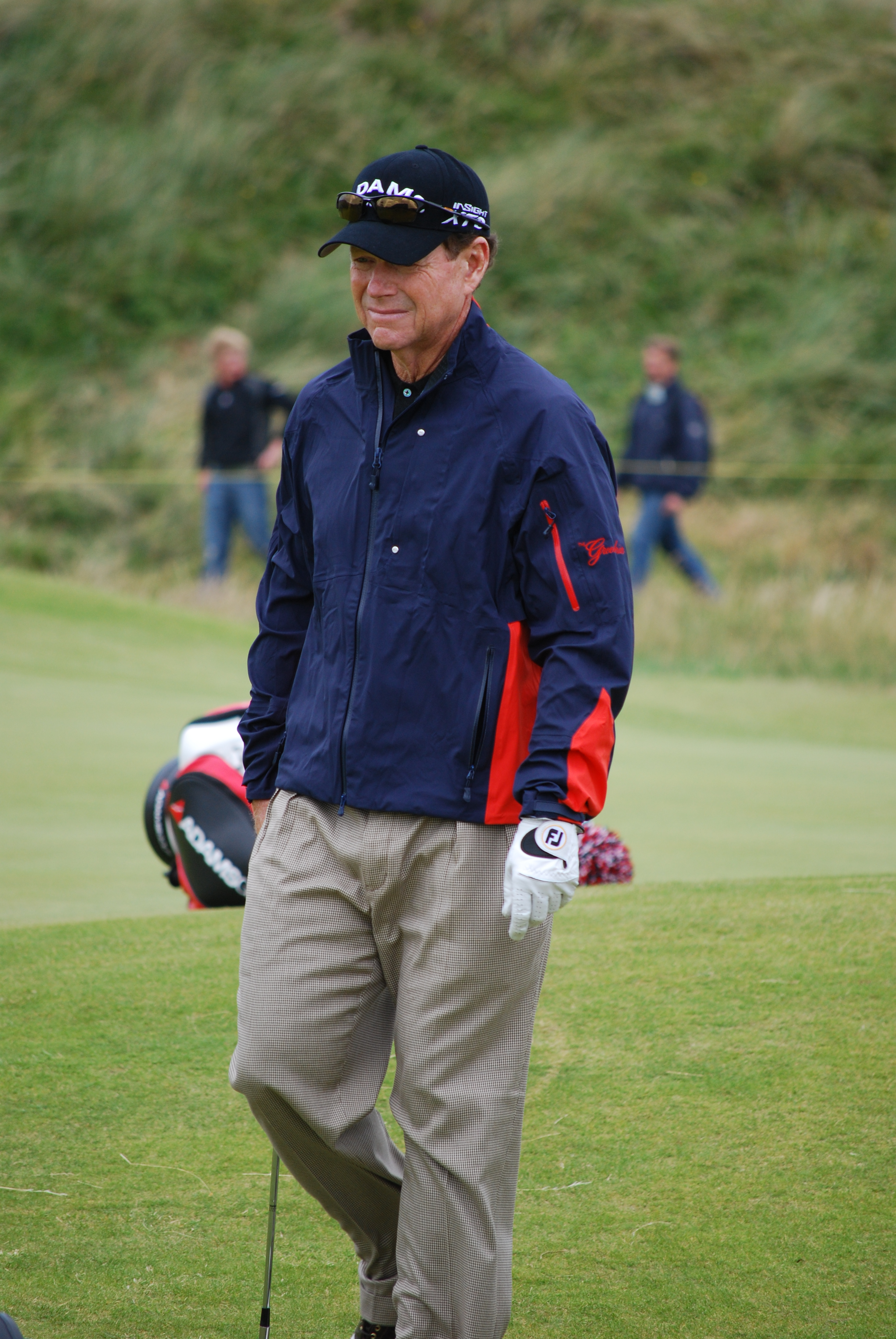
Tom Watson, Eight-time Men's major golf champion. World's top-ranked player from 1978 to 1982

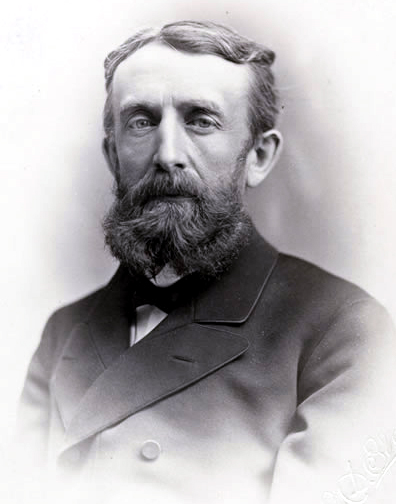
Andrew Dickson White, first president of the Ivy League's Cornell University

== Local chapter or member misconduct ==
In 1983, Tau chapter at Stanford University split off from the national fraternity organization over controversy regarding that chapter's inclusion of women as initiated members. The chapter had begun the tradition of initiating women some years earlier, but when a female member became president of the chapter, the national fraternity organization reacted with an immediate suspension and threat of charter revocation. Tau chapter became Alpha Sigma Co-Ed Fraternity thereafter, surviving independently for over ten years.

In 2018, Jacob Stephens, the fraternity's treasurer at the University of Oklahoma was convicted of stealing $32,000 from the chapter. He was charged with embezzlement.

In October 2025, the Rutgers University chapter of Alpha Sigma Phi was suspended after a student was critically injured in an alleged hazing incident. It was reported that student, 19. was hospitalized with found unresponsive and hospitalized with critical injuries. The chapter was put on "organizational disciplinary probation" until May 2026 and was placed on social probation. The city of New Brunswick, New Jersey reportedly posted a notice on the chapter residence declaring it an "unsafe structure." The national Alpha Sigma Phi organization threatened to permanently expel to students who directly or indirectly participated in hazing, and decided later to close the chapter. Alpha Sigma Phi announced they intended to sue their own former members regarding this incident but as of September 2026 have not filed any legal action.

== See also ==
- List of social fraternities
