= Phi Pi Phi =

American collegiate fraternity (1915–1939)

- ΦΠΦ
- Founded: November 15, 1915; 110 years ago Northwestern University
- Type: Social
- Former affiliation: NIC
- Status: Merged
- Merge date: 1939
- Successor: Alpha Sigma Phi
- Scope: National
- Member badge
- Colors: Turquoise Blue and Black
- Flower: Bluebell
- Publication: The Quarterly of Phi Pi Phi
- Chapters: 21
- Headquarters: United States

Phi Pi Phi (ΦΠΦ) was a social fraternity founded at Northwestern University in 1915. It merged with Alpha Sigma Phi in 1939.

== History ==
Phi Pi Phi was founded on November 15, 1915 at Northwestern University as a graduate fraternity. On June 8, 1923, it reorganized as an undergraduate social collegiate fraternity, with Northwestern University becoming the Alpha chapter. Several chapters were established at midwestern universities, many by absorbing existing local fraternities. The original founders became the Alpha Omega alumni chapter.

The fraternity joined the National Interfraternity Conference as a junior member November 1924. The fraternity's national office was established in Chicago. In 1925, it absorbed the two chapters of the regional fraternity Epsilon Alpha Chi.

The fraternity's magazine was The Quarterly of Phi Pi Phi, established in 1924. It published a songbook in 1927.

Phi Pi Phi had chartered 21 chapters by 1930. However, the fraternity was impacted by the Great Depression and only seven remained active by 1930. Phi Pi Phi and Alpha Sigma Phi discussed merging between 1937 and 1938.

The merger was announced in 1938 took place in 1939. At the time, Phi Pi Phi had five active chapters that were absorbed by Alpha Sigma Phi: Case Institute of Technology, Baldwin Wallace College, Westminster College, Illinois Institute of Technology, and Purdue University. The chapter at the University of Mississippi had been considered for participation in the merger but it failed before initiation.

Special initiations of Phi Pi Phi alumni took place from the time of the merger through 1944.

== Symbols and traditions ==
The colors of Phi Pi Phi were turquoise blue and black. Its flower was the bluebell.

Its badge was a monogram of the three Greek letters, with the letter Π superimposed upon intertwined letters Φ and Φ. The left hand Φ could be rendered chased or engraved with scrollwork, and the Π, normally set with pearls, was occasionally set with other precious stones at the corners to denote grand officers.

== Chapters ==
Following is a list of Phi Pi Phi chapters. Active chapters at the time of the merger are noted in bold, inactive chapters at that time are noted in italics.

Chapter	Charter date and range	Institution	Location	Status	Ref.
Alpha	1923–1934	Northwestern University	Evanston, Illinois	Inactive	(Note: Alpha chapter was originally established in 1915 as an evolution of a predecessor graduate fraternity.)
Beta	1923–1934	University of Chicago	Chicago, Illinois	Inactive	
**Gamma**	November 24, 1923–1939	Armour Institute of Technology (IIT)	Chicago, Illinois	Merged (**ΑΣΦ**)	(Note: The Illinois Institute of Technology was formed in 1940 with the merger of the Armour Institute of Technology and the nearby Lewis Institute.) (Note: This chapter originated as the Gamma chapter of Beta Phi, established in 1913.) (Note: Became the Alpha Xi chapter of Alpha Sigma Phi with the national merger of the two fraternities.)
**Delta**	1923–1939	University of Illinois Urbana-Champaign	Champaign, Illinois	Merged (**ΑΣΦ**)	(Note: Chapter formed from Iota Phi Delta (local), established in 1920.) (Note: Chapter merged with an existing chapter of Alpha Sigma Phi at the time of the national merger of the two fraternities.)
Epsilon	1924–1933	Washburn College	Topeka, Kansas	Inactive	
Zeta	1924–1934	University of Wisconsin–Madison	Madison, Wisconsin	Inactive	(Note: Chapter formed from Kappa Tau Sigma (local), established in 1923.)
Eta	1924–1935	University of Utah	Salt Lake City, Utah	Inactive	(Note: Chapter formed from Chi Sigma Delta (local), established in 1921.)
Theta	May 15, 1924–1932	University of California, Berkeley	Berkeley, California	Inactive	(Note: Chapter formed from the Alkamoi Club, established in 1922.)
Iota	May 30, 1925 – 1934	Washington & Jefferson College	Washington, Pennsylvania	Inactive	(Note: Chapter formed from Epsilon Alpha Chi (regional), established in 1922.)
Kappa	May 31, 1925–1926	University of Pennsylvania	Philadelphia, Pennsylvania	Inactive	(Note: Chapter formed from Epsilon Alpha Chi (regional), established in 1924.)
**Lambda**	January 30, 1926–1939	Case School of Applied Science	Cleveland, Ohio	Merged (**ΑΣΦ**)	(Note: Chapter formed from Mu Sigma/Tau Delta Tau (locals), established in 1909.) (Note: Became the Alpha Lambda chapter of Alpha Sigma Phi with the national merger of the two fraternities.)
**Mu**	May 21, 1926–1939	Baldwin Wallace College	Berea, Ohio	Merged (**ΑΣΦ**)	(Note: Chapter formed from Gamma Lambda Sigma (local), established in 1883.) (Note: Became the Alpha Mu chapter of Alpha Sigma Phi with the national merger of the two fraternities.)
**Nu**	February 12, 1927–1939	Westminster College	New Wilmington, Pennsylvania	Merged (**ΑΣΦ**)	(Note: Chapter formed from the Crescent Club, established in 1906.) (Note: Became the Alpha Nu chapter of Alpha Sigma Phi with the national merger of the two fraternities.)
Xi	April 29, 1927–1933	North Carolina State University	Raleigh, North Carolina	Inactive	(Note: Chapter formed from Sigma Delta (local), established in 1920.)
Omicron	September 17, 1927–1938	University of Mississippi	University, Mississippi	Inactive	(Note: Chapter formed from Pi Phi (local), likely created as a planned expansion, established earlier in 1927.)
Pi	May 5, 1928–1936	University of South Carolina	Columbia, South Carolina	Inactive	(Note: Chapter formed from Mu Club (local), established in 1927.)
Rho	December 3, 1928–1933	St. Lawrence University	Canton, New York	Inactive	(Note: Chapter formed from Gamma Sigma Rho (local), established in 1925.)
Sigma	May 25, 1929–1934	Pennsylvania State University	State College, Pennsylvania	Inactive	(Note: Chapter formed from Beta Lambda Sigma (local), established in 1915.)
Tau	May 18, 1929–1937	University of Tennessee	Knoxville, Tennessee	Inactive	(Note: Chapter formed from Pi Phi (local), likely created as a planned expansion, established in 1928.)
Upsilon	November 9, 1929–1932	Oregon State University	Corvallis, Oregon	Inactive	(Note: Chapter formed from Sigma Gamma (local), established in 1920.)
**Phi**	May 17, 1930–1939	Purdue University	West Lafayette, Indiana	Merged (**ΑΣΦ**)	(Note: Chapter formed from the Euphemian Club, established in 1926.) (Note: Became the Alpha Pi chapter of Alpha Sigma Phi with the national merger of the two fraternities.)
