= Alpha Kappa Pi =

Defunct American collegiate social fraternity

- ΑΚΠ
- Founded: January 1, 1921; 105 years ago New Jersey Institute of Technology
- Type: Social
- Former affiliation: NIC
- Status: Merged
- Merge date: September 6, 1946
- Successor: Alpha Sigma Phi
- Scope: National
- Colors: Dartmouth Green and White
- Flower: Yellow Tea Rose
- Publication: The Alpha
- Chapters: 36
- Headquarters: United States

Alpha Kappa Pi (ΑΚΠ) was an American collegiate social fraternity founded in 1921 at the Newark College of Engineering. In 1946, it merged with Alpha Sigma Phi.

== History ==
Alpha Kappa Pi was a social fraternity founded on Jan. 1, 1921 at the Newark College of Engineering (now the New Jersey Institute of Technology), under the name Phi Delta Zeta. A committee was formed to complete a plan for nationalization, largely by absorbing local fraternity chapters. It established its Beta chapter in 1926 at Wagner College (in New York), lending the name of the Wagner local chapter to become the name of the new national, now Alpha Kappa Pi, and adding two more chapters that year. Alpha Kappa Pi would go on to form 36 chapters over the next two decades.

Alpha Kappa Pi joined the NIC in 1931.In addition to the absorption of local chapters, three of the remaining chapters of Sigma Delta Rho were added in 1936–37, as were two chapters of disintegrating Theta Nu Epsilon, in 1940. It had a total membership of 3,105 in 1940.

On September 6, 1946, Alpha Kappa Pi merged with Alpha Sigma Phi (ΑΣΦ), mostly resulting in new chapters. There were only two campuses where a local merger was effected, as both groups were active there. Some recently dormant chapters of ΑΚΠ were assigned new names within the Alpha Sigma Phi roster.

== Symbols ==
The fraternity's badge was a seven-pointed gold star in black enamel, decorated with the Greek letters ΑΚΠ above crossed swords. Its colors were Dartmouth green and white. Its flower was the yellow tea rose.

Alpha Kappa Pi's magazine was The Alpha

== Chapters ==
Following is a list of Alpha Kappa Pi chapters. Inactive chapters and institutions are in italics.

Chapter	Charter date and range	Institution	Location	Status	Ref.
Alpha	January 1, 1921 – September 6, 1946	New Jersey Institute of Technology	Newark, New Jersey	Merged (ΑΣΦ)	(Note: Originated as Phi Delta Zeta (local) in 1921.) (Note: Became the Alpha Rho chapter of Alpha Sigma Phi with the national merger of the two fraternities.)
Beta	November 15, 1926 – September 6, 1946	Wagner College	Staten Island, New York	Merged (ΑΣΦ)	(Note: Originated as Alpha Kappa Pi (local) in 1923, whose name was adopted by the new national fraternity.) (Note: Became the Alpha Sigma chapter of Alpha Sigma Phi with the national merger of the two fraternities.)
Gamma	June 24, 1926 – September 6, 1946	Stevens Institute of Technology	Hoboken, New Jersey	Merged (ΑΣΦ)	(Note: Originated as Phi Nu (local) in 1923.) (Note: Became the Alpha Tau chapter of Alpha Sigma Phi with the national merger of the two fraternities.)
Delta	November 19, 1926 – September 6, 1946	Polytechnic Institute	Brooklyn, New York	Merged (ΑΣΦ)	(Note: Originated as Phi Psi (local) in 1922.) (Note: Became the Alpha Upsilon chapter of Alpha Sigma Phi with the national merger of the two fraternities.)
Epsilon	January 1, 1927 – 1928	Ellsworth College	Iowa Falls, Iowa	Inactive	(Note: Now a community college, Ellsworth College had been a four-year institution while hosting a chapter of Alpha Kappa Pi. This chapter originated as either Chi Pi Theta (local) or as Chi Tau Gamma Theta in 18xx (?). The Baird's Archive shows two conflicting predecessor groups.)
Zeta	January 7, 1928 – 1935	Coe College	Cedar Rapids, Iowa	Withdrew (local)	(Note: Originated as Lambda Tau Delta (local) in 1920. After withdrawal from Alpha Kappa Pi, this chapter merged into older local fraternity Delta Phi Epsilon, a group which had originated in 1901. On January 16, 1954 the combined local fraternity would become the restored Beta Epsilon chapter of Sigma Nu.)
Eta	May 12, 1928 – September 6, 1946	Presbyterian College	Clinton, South Carolina	Merged (ΑΣΦ)	(Note: Originated as Phi Delta Tau (local) in 1927.) (Note: Became the Alpha Psi chapter of Alpha Sigma Phi with the national merger of the two fraternities.)
Theta	June 1, 1928 – 1938	Columbia University	New York City, New York	Inactive	(Note: Chapter originated as Sigma Theta (local) in 1928.)
Iota	May 4, 1929 – September 6, 1946	Mount Union College	Alliance, Ohio	Merged (ΑΣΦ)	(Note: Originated as Zeta Xi Lambda (local) in 1923.) (Note: Became the Beta Alpha chapter of Alpha Sigma Phi with the national merger of the two fraternities.)
Kappa	May 4, 1929 – 1935; 1939–1940	Massachusetts Institute of Technology	Cambridge, Massachusetts	Inactive	(Note: Originated as the Alpha Club (local) in 1929. Alpha Sigma Phi named this as its Beta Beta chapter, even though it had been dormant for a few years at the time of the national merger.)
Lambda	June 1, 1929 – September 6, 1946	Bethany College	Bethany, West Virginia	Merged (ΑΣΦ)	(Note: Originated as Alpha Pi Alpha (local) in 1925.) (Note: Became the Beta Gamma chapter of Alpha Sigma Phi with the national merger of the two fraternities.)
Mu	December 14, 1929 – September 6, 1946	Marshall University	Huntington, West Virginia	Merged (ΑΣΦ)	(Note: Originated as Sigma Psi (local) in 1922.) (Note: Became the Beta Delta chapter of Alpha Sigma Phi with the national merger of the two fraternities.)
Nu	January 31, 1930 – September 6, 1946	Lehigh University	Bethlehem, Pennsylvania	Merged (ΑΣΦ)	(Note: Originated as a group from Howard Hall (local) in 1927.) (Note: Became the Beta Epsilon chapter of Alpha Sigma Phi with the national merger of the two fraternities.)
Xi	May 26, 1930 – 1943	North Carolina State University	Raleigh, North Carolina	Inactive	(Note: Originated as the Alpha Club (local) in 1929. Alpha Sigma Phi named this as its Beta Zeta chapter, even though it the chapter was dormant at the time of the national merger.)
Omicron	June 30, 1930 – September 6, 1946	Pennsylvania State University	University Park, Pennsylvania	Merged (ΑΣΦ)	(Note: Originated as Delta Sigma Chi (local) in 1920.) (Note: Merged with the Upsilon chapter of Alpha Sigma Phi with the national merger of the two fraternities.)
Pi	January 31, 1931 – 1936	University of New Hampshire	Durham, New Hampshire	Inactive	(Note: Originated as Delta Pi Epsilon (local) in 1921.)
Rho	March 28, 1931 – September 6, 1946	Rutgers University	New Brunswick, New Jersey	Merged (ΑΣΦ)	(Note: Originated as Phi Lambda Sigma (local) in 1926.) (Note: Became the Beta Theta chapter of Alpha Sigma Phi with the national merger of the two fraternities.)
Sigma	May 29, 1930 – September 6, 1946	University of Illinois Urbana-Champaign	Champaign and Urbana, Illinois	Merged (ΑΣΦ)	(Note: Originated as Kappa Zeta Rho (local) in 1926.) (Note: Merged with the Eta chapter of Alpha Sigma Phi with the national merger of the two fraternities.)
Tau	May 30, 1931 – September 6, 1946	Tufts University	Medford, Massachusetts	Merged (ΑΣΦ)	(Note: Originated as Delta Phi Sigma (local) in 1906.) (Note: Became the Beta Iota chapter of Alpha Sigma Phi with the national merger of the two fraternities.)
Upsilon	February 11, 1932 –1938	Centre College	Danville, Kentucky	Inactive	(Note: Originated as Delta Phi Upsilon (local) in 1929.)
Phi	February 3, 1932 – 1939	St. John's College	Annapolis, Maryland	Inactive	(Note: Originated as Sigma Tau Omicron (local) in 1928.)
Chi	May 18, 1932 – September 6, 1946	Wake Forest University	Winston-Salem, North Carolina	Merged (ΑΣΦ)	(Note: Originated as Lambda Tau (local) in 1927.) (Note: Became the Beta Mu chapter of Alpha Sigma Phi with the national merger of the two fraternities.)
Psi	April 22, 1933 – September 6, 1946	West Virginia Wesleyan College	Buckhannon, West Virginia	Merged (ΑΣΦ)	(Note: Originated as Chi Alpha Tau (local) in 1923.) (Note: Became the Beta Nu chapter of Alpha Sigma Phi with the national merger of the two fraternities.)
Alpha Alpha	May 4, 1935 – September 6, 1946	Hartwick College	Oneonta, New York	Merged (ΑΣΦ)	(Note: Originated as Alpha Sigma Chi (local) in 1932.) (Note: Became the Beta Xi chapter of Alpha Sigma Phi with the national merger of the two fraternities.)
Alpha Beta	November 8, 1935 – September 6, 1946	Trine University	Angola, Indiana	Merged (ΑΣΦ)	(Note: Originated as Phi Lambda Tau (local) in 1924.) (Note: Became the Beta Omicron chapter of Alpha Sigma Phi with the national merger of the two fraternities.)
Alpha Gamma	September 11, 1936 – September 6, 1946	Franklin & Marshall College	Lancaster, Pennsylvania	Merged (ΑΣΦ)	(Note: Formed by absorption of the Eta chapter of Sigma Delta Rho in 1936, which had chartered with that fraternity in 1929. Earlier, that chapter had formed as the Torch Club (local) in 1927. While a chapter of Sigma Delta Rho it accepted the members of another F&M local called Alpha Pi.) (Note: Became the Beta Pi chapter of Alpha Sigma Phi with the national merger of the two fraternities.)
Alpha Delta	March 13, 1937 – September 6, 1946	University of Toledo	Toledo, Ohio	Merged (ΑΣΦ)	(Note: Formed by absorption of the Gamma chapter of Sigma Delta Rho in 1936, which had chartered with that fraternity in 1924. This chapter had originated as Zeta Omicron (local) in 1921.) (Note: Became the Beta Rho chapter of Alpha Sigma Phi with the national merger of the two fraternities.)
Alpha Epsilon	June 12, 1937 – September 6, 1946	University of Cincinnati	Cincinnati, Ohio	Merged (ΑΣΦ)	(Note: Formed by absorption of the Epsilon chapter of Sigma Delta Rho in 1936, which had chartered with that fraternity in 1926. A year earlier, in 1925, this chapter had its origination as Kappa Alpha Chi (local).) (Note: Became the Beta Sigma chapter of Alpha Sigma Phi with the national merger of the two fraternities.)
Alpha Zeta	February 12, 1938 – September 6, 1946	Wayne State University	Detroit, Michigan	Merged (ΑΣΦ)	(Note: Originated as Psi Delta (local) in 1934.) (Note: Became the Beta Tau chapter of Alpha Sigma Phi with the national merger of the two fraternities.)
Alpha Eta	April 20, 1940 – September 6, 1946	Milton College	Milton, Wisconsin	Merged (ΑΣΦ)	(Note: Originated as the Epsilon Society (local) in 1939.) (Note: Became the Beta Upsilon chapter of Alpha Sigma Phi with the national merger of the two fraternities.)
Alpha Theta	May 18, 1940 – September 6, 1946	Wofford College	Spartanburg, South Carolina	Merged (ΑΣΦ)	(Note: Originated as Alpha Beta Gamma (local) in 1939.) (Note: Became the Beta Phi chapter of Alpha Sigma Phi with the national merger of the two fraternities.)
Alpha Iota	May 28, 1940 – September 6, 1946	American University	Washington, D.C.	Merged (ΑΣΦ)	(Note: Originated as Phi Epsilon Alpha (local) in 1937.) (Note: Became the Beta Chi chapter of Alpha Sigma Phi with the national merger of the two fraternities.)
Alpha Kappa	November 16, 1940 – September 6, 1946	Rensselaer Polytechnic Institute	Troy, New York	Merged (ΑΣΦ)	(Note: Originated as a chapter of Theta Nu Epsilon in 1928.) (Note: Became the Beta Psi chapter of Alpha Sigma Phi with the national merger of the two fraternities.)
Alpha Lambda	January 17, 1942 – September 6, 1946	Ohio Northern University	Ada, Ohio	Merged (ΑΣΦ)	(Note: Originated as a chapter of Theta Nu Epsilon in 1923.) (Note: Became the Gamma Alpha chapter of Alpha Sigma Phi with the national merger of the two fraternities.)
Alpha Mu	April 18, 1942 – 1943	Carthage College	Kenosha, Wisconsin	Inactive	(Note: Originated as Alpha Kappa Pi (local), thus with the same name as the national it would join in 1942. It had originated as the local Alpha Kappa Pi in 1921.)
Alpha Nu	February 20, 1943 – September 6, 1946	University of Connecticut	Storrs, Connecticut	Merged (ΑΣΦ)	(Note: Originated as Phi Kappa Lambda (local) in 1941.) (Note: Became the Gamma Gamma chapter of Alpha Sigma Phi with the national merger of the two fraternities.)

== See also ==
- List of social fraternities
