= Alpha Zeta (Latin American) =

American Latino fraternity

- ΑΖ
- Founded: January 1, 1890; 135 years ago Cornell University
- Type: Social
- Affiliation: Independent
- Status: Defunct
- Defunct date: 1894
- Emphasis: Latin American
- Scope: Local
- Chapters: 1
- Headquarters: Ithaca, New York; United States

Alpha Zeta (ΑΖ) Fraternity is the first-known fraternity in the United States founded by international Latin American students. It was established in 1890 at Cornell University in Ithaca, New York. It went inactive in 1894.

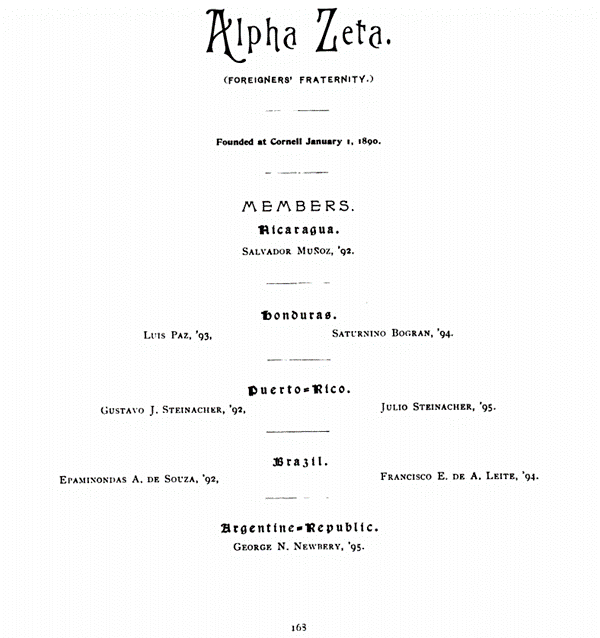
Chapter Roll of Alpha Zeta Fraternity.

== History ==
Alpha Zeta was founded at Cornell University on January 1, 1890. In the fall of 1889, international Latin American students decided to establish a fraternity that would cater to their needs. Since traveling was more of a challenge in 1889–1890, during the winter break, the organization's founders stayed in Ithaca, New York. On New Year's Day in 1890, at a meeting on campus, the founders created the first Latin American student fraternity in the United States.

Alpha Zeta had students from the Caribbean, Central and South America. The first members were noted in the 1893 Cornellian yearbook as coming from Nicaragua, Honduras, Puerto Rico, Brazil, and Argentina. The fraternity's yearbook listing, provided by the organization itself, labeled Alpha Zeta as a "Foreigners' Fraternity", indicative of its intent to serve as a meeting place for sojourning students. It ceased operations four years after it had begun.

But Alpha Zeta had, perhaps unknowingly, led a movement of international Latin American fraternities that existed in the early part of the 20th century before they too became defunct. This was long before the establishment and quick expansion of today's Latino, Asian or other cultural-affinity or Multicultural Fraternities and Sororities. These constitute a second wave of cultural-affinity fraternal growth.

To explore further the initial wave of cultural-affinity fraternities, Psi Alpha Kappa, founded at Lehigh University in the fall of 1900, was the first inter-collegiate Latin American fraternity to be established in the United States. This movement of fraternities that catered to international Latin American students included Phi Chi Delta, Sigma Iota, Phi Lambda Alpha, Lambda Sigma Alpha Fraternity, Phi Beta Mex, Phi Iota Alpha, and many others.

== See also ==
- List of Latino Greek-letter organizations
