= List of Massachusetts Institute of Technology fraternities and sororities =

Sections of the MIT Technique yearbook were enhanced by paintings and etchings. This is the frontispiece to the 1917 fraternities section.

The first fraternity at Massachusetts Institute of Technology (MIT) was Chi Phi, established in 1873. In the fall of 2023, 43 percent of MIT's male students belonged to a fraternity, while 23 percent of female students belonged to a sorority. As of 2025, MIT has 23 social fraternities, five gender-inclusive social fraternities, ten social sororities and women's fraternities. It also has nine honor societies and recognition organizations, and one service fraternity, and two professional fraternities. (Note: Note that the divisions between types of chapters may blur: On many campuses, Theta Tau fraternity operates as a non-IFC Professional Fraternity. However, at MIT, it conferences with the IFC. The fraternity Alpha Phi Alpha is listed among both the NIC fraternities and the NPHC chapters. Phi Sigma Rho is a sorority, but it also conferences with the IFC. These organizations are best described as existing on a spectrum to meet a broad range of student interests.) Five Independent Living Groups are grouped into a separate Living Group Council, but otherwise operate similarly to residential fraternities and sororities. These are known collectively as FSILGs.

Within this article, the terms "fraternity" and "sorority" are used somewhat interchangeably, with men's and co-ed groups normally using fraternity, and women's groups using either fraternity or sorority. Greek Letter Society is a generic substitute, with the word "Greek" referring to the use of Greek Letters for each society's name, and not to a Greek ethnicity. For brevity, the sections below make extensive use of Greek letters, one of the first items in a new member's instruction program. Most fraternities use two or three Greek letters to signify their symbolic or secret names; a few use non-Greek words. (Note: Within NIC fraternities, there are three that have adopted non-Greek letter names: Acacia, FarmHouse, and Triangle. None of the NPC sororities use non-Greek letter names, nor do any of the multicultural or NPHC groups.)

== History ==
The first fraternity at Massachusetts Institute of Technology (MIT) was Chi Phi, established in March 1873. (Note: This was a chapter of one of Chi Phi's predecessor groups, three of which combined to form the national fraternity as it is today. That chapter failed five years on but was re-established soon after under a new chapter name. For many years, lists of MIT chapters placed Chi Phi as third, fourth, or fifth in terms of establishment, but this list notes a chapter's first incidence on the campus to derive its date of establishment.) However, its charter was withdrawn in 1878. Chapters of Alpha Tau Omega and Theta Xi were chartered in 1885. In 1886, there were three fraternities at MIT, with a total membership of 39.

In 1886, Sigma Chi became the first MIT fraternity with facilities, renting rooms for its meetings and gatherings. This model was soon followed by the other fraternities. Many MIT fraternities are located in Boston because the institute was originally located in the Back Bay neighborhood, and had no dormitories to house its students. The fraternities and various dining clubs met a need for room and board that was not provided by the operations of the campus. Fraternity housing has continued to expand, both in terms of the size and quality of the individual buildings as well as the number of chapters. Several of MIT's fraternity buildings are today listed on the National Register of Historic Places or are otherwise notable, including former governor's mansions, college deans' mansions, and homes of various early leaders who once resided there. A cursory search of Institute yearbooks will show that dining, and later, fine dining, has remained of particular interest to participants. Many chapters extol the quality of their gourmet or commercial kitchens in their photo tours and rush materials.

In 1900, 16.1 percent or 234 students were members of MIT's eight fraternities. Within the next six years, Delta Psi had formed from The No. 6 Club (local), the local fraternity Phi Beta Epsilon had formed, and chapters were chartered for the national fraternities Chi Phi, Delta Kappa Epsilon, Delta Tau Delta, Delta Upsilon, and Phi Gamma Delta. By 1915, MIT had twenty fraternities with 481 active members or 29 percent of the student body. Around that time, the fraternities organized into the Interfraternity Council (IFC) which coordinated recruitment (rush) and intramural Greek athletics such as baseball and bowling. One early tradition established by the IFC with the support of faculty was a trophy for the best scholarship record; the trophy was a grandfather clock that was passed on to the fraternity with the best overall grade average after each term.

The tradition of fine dining among MIT fraternities is old.

MIT moved to its Cambridge campus in 1916, and newer independent living groups have sprouted up or moved in around it. Older organizations are located along Newbury Street, convenient to the old campus. Because of the move, MIT doesn't have a specific Greek Row; instead, chapter houses are scattered on both sides of the Charles River in Boston, Cambridge, and the surrounding towns.

The Technique yearbook provides a window to the growth and popularity of MIT's Greek organizations for almost 150 years.

=== Demographic changes ===
From the 1860s through World War II, MIT students were almost entirely male, thus, the formation of women's fraternities or sororities came much later. By the 2000s, the Institute's undergraduate gender ratio reached near parity. En route to this more balanced, modern phase, a period of demographic and political change in the 1960s and 1970s, following larger national trends, resulted in the conversion of several all-male, nationally affiliated living groups into local co-ed groups and led to the expansion of all-female and co-ed housing options. Most of the resultant fraternities, sororities, and independent living groups are coordinated through the Office of Fraternities, Sororities, and Independent Living Groups (FSILGs), though some independent "MIT-area" chapters do arise from time to time, along with those that serve students from multiple schools in Boston and the surrounding cities.

=== Recruitment traditions ===
Traditionally, fraternity and sorority recruitment or rush at MIT occurred during Residence/Orientation (R/O) Week, which was the final week of each summer before the start of the fall semester. All incoming freshmen and transfer students would arrive on campus a week before Registration Day, the official start of the fall semester. During R/O Week, the incoming class would participate in orientation activities, take the so-called writing test to attempt to test out of the MIT Writing Requirement, and participate in residence selection. All students were free to participate in the fraternity, sorority, and independent living group rush. Those students who did not end up in an off-campus living group would also participate in the dorm selection process (see Housing at the Massachusetts Institute of Technology).

Freshman housing rush was eliminated in an initiative led by MIT president Charles Vest in the wake of the September 1997 death of Phi Gamma Delta freshman Scott Krueger. Beginning with the 2002–2003 academic year, all freshmen were required to live on campus. The old fraternity rush has been depressurized, with recruiting spread out throughout the first academic year, and less-frantic rush events for prospective new members.

== Fraternities ==
As of the fall of 2023, 43 percent of MIT's male students belong to a fraternity. Fraternities constituting the Interfraternity Council (IFC) are listed by dates of local founding and noted with national conference membership. These are (with several exceptions) men's organizations, voluntarily coordinating their efforts within the IFC as a self-governing body. As part of IFC or national organization self-governance or University disciplinary action, chapters may be suspended (de-recognized) or closed for a time. In the following lists, if a chapter is closed, it will be grouped under inactive chapters, italicized, while active chapters or those suspended for a brief time are in bold.

=== Active fraternity chapters ===
Following are the active fraternities at MIT.

(NIC) indicates current members of the North American Interfraternity Conference;
(NPHC) indicates members of the National Pan-Hellenic Council.

- **ΧΦ** - Chi Phi, 1873–1878, 1890 (NIC) (Note: MIT's is the Beta chapter of ΧΦ. Chi Phi was the pioneer chapter on the MIT campus, which, by its establishment, became both the first social fraternity founded at MIT as well as the first social fraternity in Boston. About this time, several early branches of Chi Phi were coalescing into a larger national organization of that name. The original Tau chapter on the MIT campus was formed by the Northern Order of Chi Phi approximately one year before a national merger of three regional fraternities named Chi Phi. That first MIT chapter died five years after formation and appears to have become the Navajo Club (per FSILG records), but the fraternity was not long absent: Among Chi Phi's predecessor groups, there were several previous Beta chapters, as the process of combining three regional fraternities into one made it necessary to rename many campus chapters. Chi Phi's Harvard chapter of this name had formed in 1885 but was expelled with the other fraternities and secret organizations only two years later, in 1887. Chi Phi then moved its Beta chapter charter to MIT, re-establishing there from the Navajo Club in 1890, a chapter which has since flourished uninterrupted. Dates and notes for this and other chapters are from the FSILG report and Baird's Manual, listed prominently among the references.) (Note: Chi Phi has inhabited three houses in its history: Address in 1910: 44 Fenway, Boston, MA. Address in 1930: 22 Fenway, Boston, MA. Address from 1950 to present: 32 Hereford, Boston, MA. Chi Phi's current home, 32 Hereford, is a recognized historic landmark designed by McKim, Mead, and White and was formerly the home to John F. Andrew, a prominent 19th-century Boston politician and son of Governor John Andrew. The fraternity's renovation work was honored by the Victorian Society in America with a 2016 Preservation Award for its stewardship of this landmark.)
- **ΣΧ** - Sigma Chi, 1882 (NIC) (Note: MIT's Alpha Theta chapter of ΣΧ was founded in 1882 by ten undergraduates, and installed on March 22, 1882. It is the oldest continuously operating fraternity at the school, having been founded only after Chi Phi. The chapter house, leased by the fraternity in 1919 and purchased in 1924, is located at 532 Beacon St., Boston, MA, in the Back Bay neighborhood. Influential alumni include several DuPont brothers and company founders.)
- **ΘΞ** - Theta Xi, 1885–1897, 1901 (NIC) (Note: The fourth chapter of the first professional fraternity in the United States, Delta chapter of Theta Xi was chartered April 19, 1885. Now a general fraternity, Theta Xi is located at 64 Bay State Road, Boston, MA, in the Back Bay. Most members are housed in the fraternity's two brownstones overlooking the Charles River, less than a block away from Kenmore Square. Notable alumni include Charles Hayden, Delta, class of 1924, whose philanthropic efforts were recognized by the naming of a library at MIT, a Boston University business building, and planetariums at both the Boston Museum of Science and the American Museum of Natural History.)
- **ΔΨ** - St. Anthony Hall, aka Delta Psi and No. Six Club, 1889 (NIC), co-ed (Note: Installed April 6, 1889, the Number Six Club is a chapter of Delta Psi, a nationally-affiliated literary and social fraternity. This chapter is one of two co-ed residential fraternities on the MIT campus. Delta Psi is more commonly known at its other campuses as St. Anthony Hall. Address by 1913: 428 Memorial Drive, Cambridge, MA.)
- **ΔΤΔ** - Delta Tau Delta, 1889 (NIC) (Note: Installed May 18, 1889, the Beta Nu chapter of ΔΤΔ (website), known as "Delts", is located at 416 Beacon Street, Boston, MA. The stated mission of the society is "Committed to Lives of Excellence".)
- **ΘΔΧ** - Theta Delta Chi, 1890–1892, 1906 (NIC), co-ed (Note: The Theta Deuteron Charge is the local chapter of ΘΔΧ fraternity at MIT. "TDX" or ΘΔΧ calls its chapters "charges." Known to its members as "Theta Deut", the charge was founded on March 21, 1890, but lasted only 2 years before disbanding. About a decade later, in 1902, a group of MIT undergrads founded a local fraternity, Alpha Epsilon, to become the new Theta Delta Chi, which was chartered on June 2, 1906. The charge is now located at 372 Memorial Drive, Cambridge, MA, overlooking the Charles River. In 1966, Theta Deuteron acquired the property and the house, a former MIT dean's mansion. During the 1980s, a fourth floor was added to the house.)
- **ΦΒΕ** - Phi Beta Epsilon (local), 1890 (Note: MIT's Phi Beta Epsilon, or "PBE" is a local fraternity, founded on April 1, 1890. It is also one of the oldest fraternities at MIT. PBE was registered as a non-profit corporation with the Commonwealth of Massachusetts on May 15, 1896. The chapter is located at 400 Memorial Drive, Cambridge, MA, completing a major renovation of their home in Fall 2013. Phi Beta Epsilon has a resident population of about 45.)
- **ΔΚΕ** - Delta Kappa Epsilon, 1890 (NIC) (Note: ΔΚΕ's Sigma Tau chapter, installed December 6, 1890, is located at 403 Memorial Drive, Cambridge, MA, on MIT's west campus. Brothers are highly involved in campus activities, with more than half participating as varsity athletes.)
- **ΣΑΕ** - Sigma Alpha Epsilon, 1892–1999, 2009 (NIC) (Note: Installed November 25, 1892, MIT's Iota-Tau chapter of ΣΑΕ is located at 165 Bay State Road, Boston, MA, in the heart of historic Back Bay. Founded in 1892, the social fraternity is known for its strong emphasis on service and philanthropy. Its school portal may be reached at SAE.)
- **ΠΛΦ** - Pi Lambda Phi, 1897–1901, 1920 (NIC) (Note: Since 1940, MIT's Massachusetts Theta chapter of ΠΛΦ is located at 450 Beacon Street, Boston, MA. The origins of Pi Lambda Phi on the MIT campus came in 1897, but its first emergence on the MIT campus didn't take hold, a difficulty experienced by many of its other chapters. The national fraternity re-established itself with a 1908 effort begun at Columbia that it terms the Revitalization Period, eventually joining in a merger with Phi Beta Delta, which had placed its Theta chapter at MIT as of 1920. Thus, this didn't represent a recolonization in 1920, but rather, a name change to Pi Lam with the 1941 merger. As the first national non-sectarian fraternity (1895), Pi Lambda Phi was the first to welcome men of all creeds. Notable alumni include Nobel prize winner Richard Feynman (Physics, 1939).) (Note: In a 1941 national merger between Phi Beta Delta and Pi Lambda Phi, the Massachusetts Theta chapter of Phi Beta Delta was merged that year with the older Delta Nu chapter of Pi Lambda Phi, welcoming its alumni into that fraternity. However, the resulting chapter kept the newer chapter name of the MA Theta chapter.)
- **ΦΣΚ** - Phi Sigma Kappa, 1902 (NIC) (Note: Installed May 24, 1902, MIT's Omicron chapter of ΦΣΚ or "Phi Sig" is located at 487 Commonwealth Ave., Boston, MA, in the heart of Boston's Kenmore Square. Their home was originally built as the Lieutenant Governor's mansion by noted architect R. Clipston Sturgis. Three MIT sorority houses, two BU dormitories, and Fenway Park surround PSK's two stately townhouses. The five-storied Phi Sig chapter house features a commercial chef's kitchen, a historic paneled library, a billiard room, gym facilities on the lower level, a screening room, and a dramatic roof deck. This magnificent Back Bay private residence is home to 45 brothers. Alumni include Paul E. Gray '54, 14th President of MIT, John H. Sununu '61, former Governor of New Hampshire and former White House Chief of Staff, and numerous leaders in finance.)
- **ΘΧ** - Theta Chi, 1902 (NIC) (Note: Installed December 3, 1902, MIT's Beta chapter of ΘΧ, located at 528 Beacon St., Boston, MA, is the oldest active chapter of its national fraternity. The chapter was founded by Park Valentine Perkins, a former member of Theta Chi's Alpha chapter at Norwich University.)
- **ΦΚΣ** - Phi Kappa Sigma, 1903 (NIC) (Note: Installed October 16, 1903, MIT's Alpha Mu chapter of ΦΚΣ, also known as "Skullhouse", is located at 530 Beacon Street, Boston, MA. It hosts a bi-annual party, "Skuffle", where, in previous years, a giant skull was built around the facade and a maze was constructed in the basement. This practice was halted, and the members were forced to adjust to a more amenable decorating plan after Boston officials declined to provide necessary licenses)
- **ΖΒΤ** - Zeta Beta Tau, 1911–22, 1961 (NIC) (Note: Installed February 25, 1911 and re-installed February 25, 1961, MIT's Xi chapter of ΖΒΤ is located at 58 Manchester Rd, Brookline, MA, a suburb of Boston. It appears the FSILG reference is in error on this re-charter date, as 1956 marked the emergence of the Dover group, the predecessor to the chapter, not the ΖΒΤ installation.)
- **ΒΘΠ** - Beta Theta Pi, 1913–2011, 2013 (NIC) (Note: Installed September 27, 1913, MIT's Beta Upsilon chapter of ΒΘΠ (website) may be found at 119 Bay State Rd, Boston MA.)
- **ΚΣ** - Kappa Sigma, 1914 (Note: Installed August 3, 1914, the MIT Gamma-Pi chapter of ΚΣ is located in a 5-story townhouse on the Charles River at 407 Memorial Drive, Cambridge, MA, on MIT's west campus. The chapter has been a recipient of the Founders' Circle award for chapter excellence, the highest honor throughout Kappa Sigma.) (Note: Both ΦΔΘ and ΚΣ nationals withdrew from the NIC in 2002. ΛΧΑ severed ties in 2015. ΤΚΕ resigned its membership in 2016. ΣΦΕ withdrew in 2019. ΦΣΚ withdrew in 2002 but rejoined in 2006. It was the first chapter to racially integrate within the national fraternity.)
- **ΦΚΘ** - Phi Kappa Theta, 1918 (NIC) (Note: The Massachusetts Eta chapter of ΦΚΘ, or "PKT", is located at 229 Commonwealth Avenue, Boston, MA, a four-story, century-old brownstone in Boston's Back Bay. The chapter was founded at MIT on April 3, 1918, under the local fraternity name Alpha Epsilon, marked by its first official meeting in Senior House, Holman 303. Ten days later, the group voted to join Phi Kappa, chartering on January 1, 1919. On April 29, 1959, the Massachusetts Eta chapter of Phi Kappa at MIT, along with others across the nation, merged with Theta Kappa Phi, becoming the Massachusetts Eta chapter of Phi Kappa Theta.)
- **ΣΝ** - Sigma Nu, 1922–1974, 1995 (NIC) (Note: Today's Epsilon Theta chapter of ΣΝ is located at 28 Fenway, Boston, MA, in the Back Bay Fens. Its building is currently home to 40 brothers. This chapter is the second group to call itself ΣΝ. In 1970, MIT's original Epsilon Theta chapter of ΣΝ, then already 50 years old, opted to go co-educational. Disagreement over this policy led the former group to secede from the national organization and become the local Independent Living Group Epsilon Theta, which continues in a former ΣΝ building at 259 St. Paul Street, Brookline, Massachusetts. It is now a member of the Living Group Council for Independent Living Groups. The present chapter was re-established in 1995 by a local fraternity, Delta Pi. After much research and discussion, Delta Pi members decided that the stability of a national fraternity with fifty years of alumni backing would aid in maintaining their brotherhood. Sigma Nu was the first choice of the members, who voted unanimously to become the MIT Colony of Sigma Nu. Their petition was prepared and sent to Sigma Nu National requesting a charter on December 4, 1994. Already a fully mature organization, on April 22, 1995, ΣΝ officially re-chartered the Epsilon Theta chapter at MIT.) (Note: Formation of the local fraternity, Delta Pi, came about when, in the Spring of 1990, the Mu Tau chapter of ΑΕΠ participated in a major reorganization by the national organization, which discharged 45 of the 55 MIT Mu Tau chapter members who were not Jewish. The ten remaining members, all Jewish, who were invited to remain in the fraternity declined the offer to stay and went on to form the local group called Delta Pi, the same that later affiliated with the national fraternity, Sigma Nu. ΑΕΠ immediately recruited a new roster of members, continuing uninterrupted chapter operations in the Fall of 1990.)
- **ΦΔΘ** - Phi Delta Theta, 1932 (Note: MIT's Massachusetts Gamma chapter of ΦΔΘ, commonly known as "Phi Delts," is located at 97 Bay State Road, Boston, MA. Formed as a local fraternity, Psi Delta, that group affiliated with ΦΔΘ in 1932. In anticipation or support of this, a "Phi Delta Theta Alumni Club" was formed on campus in the late 1920s. See the 1929 MIT Technique yearbook, p.396, for example.)
- **ΚΑΨ** - Kappa Alpha Psi, 1975 (NPHC) and (NIC) (Note: MIT's is the Theta Iota chapter of ΚΑΨ. The chapter is non-residential, serving MIT, Harvard, and Tufts.)
- **ΑΔΦ** - Alpha Delta Phi Society, 1976 (NIC) (Note: MIT's Lambda Phi chapter of ΑΔΦ is located at 351 Massachusetts Avenue, Cambridge, MA. The chapter was founded in 1976 through the assistance of the brothers of the half-century-dormant Lambda Phi fraternity, which was a local fraternity at MIT from 1906 to 1925. That was a literary fraternity that had, in its early days, unsuccessfully petitioned to join Alpha Delta Phi. Their petition had been rejected because ΑΔΦ considered MIT at that time to be an engineering trade school (!) and thus not compatible with their literary tradition. Henry Leeb (MIT Class of 1915) remained friends with members of ΑΔΦ but died only 3 weeks after the current chapter was approved. The chapter was named in honor of that predecessor group.)
- **ΝΔ** - Nu Delta (local), 1977 (Note: MIT's local fraternity, called ΝΔ, owns a four-storied house at 460 Beacon Street, Boston, MA, in the Back Bay area, separated from the MIT campus by the Charles River. The house's resident population is about 30. Founded in 1936 as the Nu Delta chapter of the national fraternity of Phi Mu Delta, ΝΔ broke from its former national and is now an independent local fraternity. ΝΔ participates in many events on campus, especially for intramural sports and dance.)
- **ΖΨ** - Zeta Psi, 1979 (NIC) (Note: MIT's Rho Alpha chapter of ΖΨ is located at 233 Massachusetts Ave., Cambridge, MA.)
- **ΑΦΑ** - Alpha Phi Alpha, 1989 (NPHC) and (NIC) (Note: Non-residential, this is the Rho Nu chapter of ΑΦΑ, an historically black organization. Also known as the "Rheckless" Rho Nu chapter, the fraternity was established on September 26, 1989. This chapter includes men from MIT, Harvard University, Babson College, and Tufts University.)
- **Xi Fellowship** - Xi Fellowship (local), 2015 co-ed (Note: Formerly a chapter of ΤΕΦ, the fraternity's Xi chapter created a fraternity-within-a-fraternity for co-ed membership, withdrawing from the national fraternity in 2023. It continues to caucus within the campus IFC.)
- **ΨΚΦ** - Phi Kappa Psi, 2025 (NIC)

=== Fraternity chapters with name changes ===
Following are former names of fraternities at MIT.

- Navajo Club (local) - 1878–1890, an interim group that became **ΧΦ**
- Number 6 Club (local) -1887–1889, became **ΔΨ** (Note: This group was named the Number Six club for two years before its establishment as a chapter of ΔΨ, likely named after its residence at Six Louisburg Square, Boston MA, (1887-1913). The chapter became co-educational in 1970.)
- ΑΕ - Alpha Epsilon (local), 1902–1906, became **ΘΔΧ**
- ΛΦ - Lambda Phi (local), 1906–1925, inspired **ΑΔΦ**
- ΚΘ - Kappa Theta (local), 1908–1913, became **ΒΘΠ** (Note: Active members transitioned to the new national affiliation in the 1915 MIT Technique yearbook, and the chapter remained at their address of 264 Newbury Street, Boston, MA. This had not been apparent in the 2018 version of the FSILG reference.)
- ΔΚΦ - Delta Kappa Phi (local), 1912–1914, became **ΚΣ**
- ΣΑΜ - Sigma Alpha Mu, 1917–1973 (NIC), became **Fenway House**, an Independent Living Group (Note: MIT's Xi chapter of ΣΑΜ fraternity opted to become co-educational in 1970, severing from that national fraternity in 1973. In 1961, it moved to an address at 34 The Fenway, which inspired the name for the new group. Fenway House is an Independent Living Group, rather than a fraternity.)
- ΦΚ - Phi Kappa, 1918–1959, became **ΦΚΘ** (Note: For just ten days this group was known as the Alpha Epsilon fraternity, a local formed with the intent of seeking a national affiliation. It became the Eta chapter of ΦΚ, keeping the same name after the national merger into ΦΚΘ some forty years later.)
- ΤΕΦ - Tau Epsilon Phi, 1919–1930, 1957–2023 (NIC), co-ed, became **Xi Fellowship** (Note: Founded on December 6, 1919, and re-installed October 19, 1957, MIT's Xi chapter of ΤΕΦ is also known as "tEp". The chapter was dormant from 1930 up to the 1956 restoration, when it absorbed the T.E.P. Club that had been formed in 1953. The chapter was not listed in the 1930 MIT Technique yearbook. Within ΤΕΦ was the "Xi Fellowship", which it branded as "a co-ed experience within the chapter", a sub-group first recognized by MIT in 2015. Thus, this fraternity operates as a de facto co-ed group within the IFC. Nationally, the fraternity was established with a more open membership policy, one of several Jewish fraternities formed at a time when membership in most fraternal organizations was limited to Christian (primarily Protestant), Caucasian men. The national was known to have quickly moved to a non-sectarian basis and thus was the first of the Jewish nationals to become non-sectarian. The MIT chapter went further, becoming one of the first chapters of its national fraternity to include non-Caucasians. It was open, too, to gay members since the late 1960s. The chapter house is located at 253 Commonwealth Avenue, Boston, Massachusetts, in the Back Bay neighborhood. Note that the 1929 MIT Technique yearbook has an error for the establishment date, where it says 1910 - a typo, p.365. tEps distinguish themselves with their fraternity color, purple, and an attachment to the number 22. In 2023, the chapter withdrew from ΤΕΦ to operate as a local, under the Xi Fellowship name. Notable alumni of ΤΕΦ include Neil W. Woodward III '84, US Astronaut.)
- ΦΒΔ - Phi Beta Delta, 1920–1941, Jewish, (see **ΠΛΦ**) (Note: In a 1941 national merger between Phi Beta Delta and Pi Lambda Phi, the Massachusetts Theta chapter of Phi Beta Delta was merged in that year with the older Delta Nu chapter of Pi Lambda Phi, welcoming its alumni into that fraternity. However, the resulting chapter kept the newer chapter name of the MA Theta chapter.)
- ΦΣΔ - Phi Sigma Delta, 1921–1927, Jewish, (see **ΖΒΤ**) (Note: This was the Nu chapter of ΦΣΔ. First noted in the 1923 MIT Technique yearbook, pp.406-407. It did not survive until the national merger with ΖΒΤ in 1959.)
- Sigma Nu Club (local) - 1921–1922, became **ΣΝ** (Note: Formed in 1921 by faculty, post-grad and undergraduate members of ΣΝ, this short-lived group became that fraternity's Epsilon Theta chapter.)
- ΦΜΔ - Phi Mu Delta,1922–1977, became **ΝΔ** (Note: Formed in 1922 as the Nu Delta chapter of its three-year-old national, Phi Mu Delta itself was an outgrowth of the Commons Clubs. The chapter has had stable housing at 460 Beacon Street, Boston, Massachusetts, since the mid-1930s. ΦΜΔ had originated nationally from the Commons Clubs, a non-Greek organization, in 1918.)
- ΨΔ - Psi Delta (local), 1922–1932, (NIC), became **ΦΔΘ**
- ΣΩΨ - Sigma Omega Psi, 1922–1935?, Jewish, became ΑΕΠ (Note: After the closure of MIT's Xi chapter of ΣΩΨ, that fraternity nationally merged into ΑΕΠ (1940), taking on a new name of Mu Tau chapter.)
- Alpha Club (local) - 1929–1929, became ΑΚΠ (see ΑΣΦ) (Note: Organized in February 1929. Became the Kappa chapter of ΑΚΠ on May 4, 1929.)
- ΑΚΠ - Alpha Kappa Pi - 1929–1940, became ΑΣΦ (Note: This was the Kappa chapter of ΑΚΠ, which died six years before the national merger with ΑΣΦ, which would later rename it posthumously as its Beta Beta chapter.)
- Pegis Club (local) - 1948–1952, became ΣΦΕ
- Dover Club (local) - 1956–1961, became **ΖΒΤ** (Note: Transfer members formed this club specifically as a colony that would petition to re-charter as ΖΒΤ. Note that the FSILG history shows the reactivation of the chapter in 1956. This is likely in error, as the Dover Club continued until what the chapter reports was a February 25, 1961, re-charter of ΖΒΤ.)
- ΠΚΑ - Pi Kappa Alpha, 1970–1981, 2010-11 (NIC), became **pika**, an Independent Living Group (Note: MIT's Eta Delta chapter of ΠΚΑ fraternity opted to become co-educational in 1975, severing from that national fraternity in 1981. In 1970, it moved to an address at 69 Chestnut Street. pika remains at that address today as an Independent Living Group. The national fraternity of ΠΚΑ opened a short-lived colony in 2010, which lasted a year.)
- ΔΠ - Delta Pi (local), 1990–1995, became **ΣΝ** (Note: Delta Pi was formed in April 1990 as a local fraternity to continue the brotherhood experienced by former members of the Mu Tau chapter of ΑΕΠ fraternity. A house was acquired by the suddenly homeless fraternity in the spring of 1991. The fall rush of 1991 proved successful with seven men pledged, but that year, the house struggled financially. Members moved to apartments in Boston and Cambridge. At this point, members also decided to waive their fall rush activities for 1992 because they doubted the fraternity's future. Yet that same Fall of 1992 proved to be a turning point, when younger members, spurred on by the risk of closure, rallied to continue the organization. Prompted by their enthusiasm, the fraternity looked at several options, one being affiliation with another national fraternity. They became a non-residential colony of ΣΝ that year.)
- ΘΤ - Theta Tau, 1912–1930, 2016-2025, became **ΨΚΦ**

=== Inactive fraternity chapters ===
Following are the inactive fraternities at MIT.

- ΑΤΩ - Alpha Tau Omega, 1885–1887, 1905–2009 (NIC) (Note: ΑΤΩ's address, before its 2009 closing, had been 405 Memorial Drive, Cambridge, MA. First installed April 3, 1885. The 2009 closure was for at least 10 years, so as of 2019, the fraternity is eligible to return to campus.)
- ΦΓΔ - Phi Gamma Delta, 1889–1894, 1899–1998 (NIC) (Note: Fiji maintains a policy for its members that severely limits use of its Greek letters to a handful of approved usages, such as their official ring, chapter plaques and memorial markers. Thus, you will see "Fiji" on shirts, but not the fraternity's Greek letters.) (Note: ΦΓΔ's Iota Mu chapter was dissolved in 1998 as the result of an alcohol-related death, proceedings accessed June 17, 2020. The case had such notoriety that Fiji closed the chapter permanently. Its property assets, at 28 The Fenway, were sold with proceeds used to establish a charitable gift fund.)
- ΔΥ - Delta Upsilon, 1891–2014 (NIC) (Note: Installed November 11, 1891, ΔΥ's Technology chapter was located at 526 Beacon Street, a building still owned by its alumni club. This six-story brownstone building is located directly across the river from MIT and is situated in the middle of Boston's Back Bay. Delta Upsilon is a non-secret brotherhood as well as the sixth-oldest fraternity in the nation. The alumni association sponsored the re-establishment of Theta Tau Professional Engineering Fraternity as new tenants of that building, which took over occupancy in 2016.)
- ΔΣ - Delta Sigma (local), 1894–1898
- ΔΣΦ - Delta Sigma Phi, 1904–1908 (NIC) (Note: This was the Delta chapter of ΔΣΦ.)
- ΘΝΕ - Theta Nu Epsilon, 1904–1916 (NIC) (Note: ΘΝΕ was an ill-favored national due to its recruitment of sophomores who were already members of other fraternities, and a policy of secrecy about the active members - those same sophomores tapped each year. It was NOT an honorary, nor a service society. (Freshmen were not included; juniors and seniors were advisory only.) Hence, ΘΝΕ became a bit of a pariah, and members were pressured to quit ΘΝΕ lest they be expelled from their primary fraternities at some of their schools; in 1913, the NIC advocated vigorously against its collegians joining ΘΝΕ. Struggling for a workable path to legitimacy, several varying models developed on ΘΝΕ's campuses: chapters became standard fraternities, and others, public inter-fraternity groups. In Alabama, it even became a political machine. In the 1930s, with the adoption of changes, ΘΝΕ briefly joined the NIC but ceased operations during WWII. Several chapters re-emerged after WWII, reforming the society as a smaller entity, with some becoming co-ed in the 1970s. The fraternity reports only a few chapters that remain active today.)
- ΛΧΑ - Lambda Chi Alpha, 1912–2014 (Note: The Lambda Zeta chapter of ΛΧΑ (or LCA) was a social fraternity located at 99 Bay State Road. The chapter was chartered in 1912. In 2014, LCA's National HQ and MIT suspended recognition of this chapter, with the provision of at least a five-year closure.) (Note: Their 6-story house was the home of a former governor of Massachusetts, with a rooftop deck view of the Charles River, Cambridge, Boston, and Fenway Park. The international measurement of a Smoot was created by the brothers when measuring the Harvard Bridge using the pledge Oliver R. Smoot as a standard of length.)
- ΤΔΦ - Tau Delta Phi, 1919–1929, 194x ? –1991+/- (NIC), Jewish (Note: MIT's was the Eta chapter of the fraternity. Re-establishment dates for this chapter are conjectural, based on scattered notices of graduates who were members via LinkedIn. The address in 1928 was 38 The Fenway, Boston, MA. Baird's Manual lists the chapter as active, but the national as dormant as of 1991. The national organization has since re-emerged with five active chapters amidst a growth plan.)
- ΑΜΣ - Alpha Mu Sigma, 1921–1926, Jewish (Note: This was the Delta chapter of ΑΜΣ.)
- ΑΦΔ - Alpha Phi Delta, 1928–37, 1939–43, 1948–53 (NIC), Italian-American (Note: This was the Tau chapter of ΑΦΔ, a fraternity that historically had an Italian-American heritage.)
- ΑΣΦ - Alpha Sigma Phi, 1929–1940, 2012–2014 (NIC) (Note: For its entire existence, this was the Kappa chapter of ΑΚΠ. The chapter went dormant six years before a national merger with ΑΣΦ, and, for any future re-colonization, was designated the new chapter name Beta Beta chapter. The national fraternity re-opened a colony in 2012, which lasted two years.)
- ΑΕΠ - Alpha Epsilon Pi, 1951–1990, 1990–202x ? (NIC) (Note: MIT's Mu Tau chapter of ΑΕΠ fraternity is located at 155 Bay State Rd, Boston, MA. The chapter was started three years earlier, in 1948, at MIT. It is the only Jewish-themed fraternity at MIT, while it is one of several with historically Jewish roots.)
- ΣΦΕ - Sigma Phi Epsilon, 1952–2019 (Note: MIT's Massachusetts Delta chapter of ΣΦΕ (website) is located at 518 Beacon St., Boston, MA. The chapter originated as the Pegis Club.)
- KKK - Kappa Kappa Kappa (local), circa 1919–20xx ?

=== Gallery of fraternity chapter houses ===
Many MIT-affiliated fraternities and sororities own private buildings in the Back Bay and Fenway–Kenmore neighborhoods in Boston.

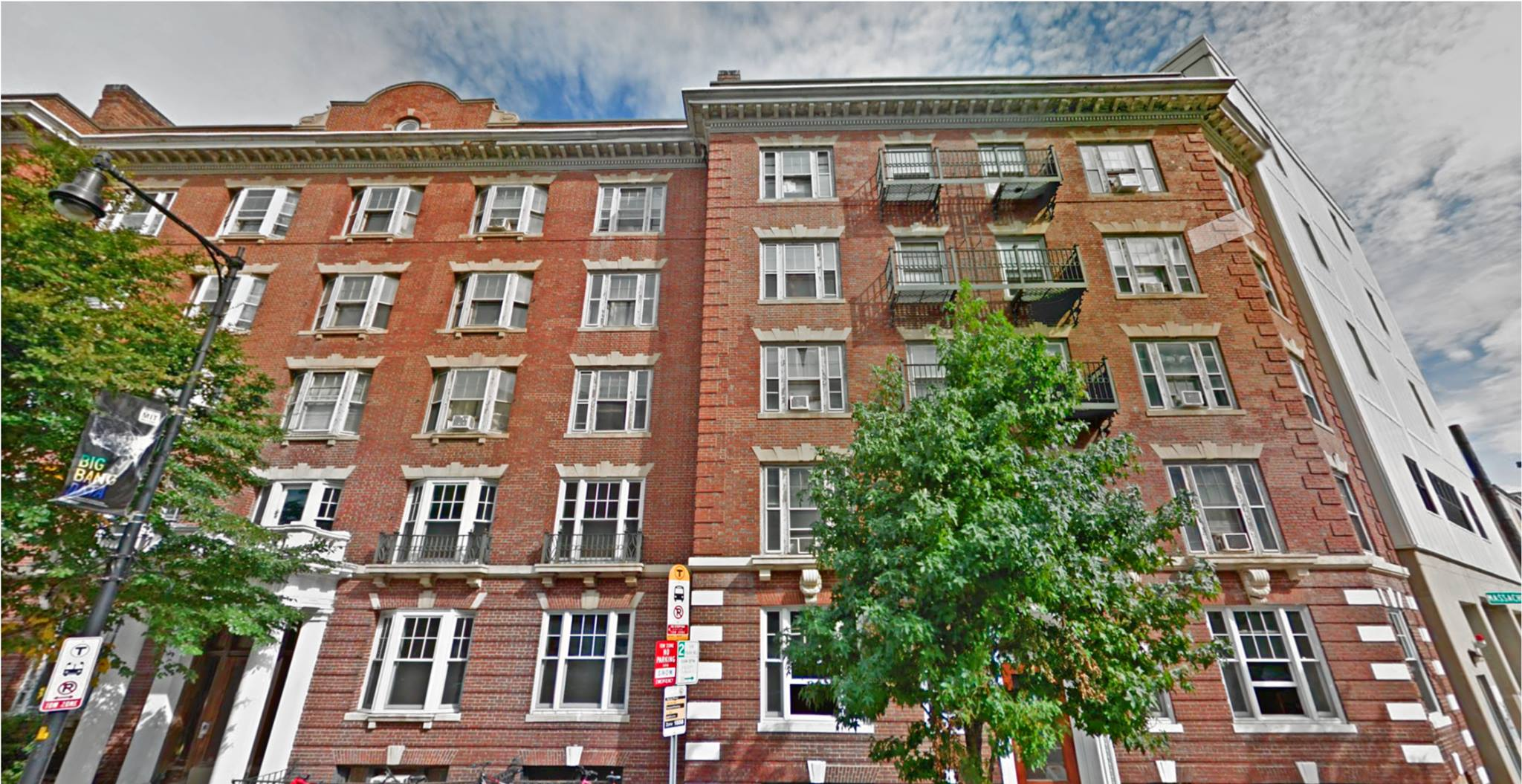
**Alpha Delta Phi's Lambda Phi chapter house at MIT, 2017**

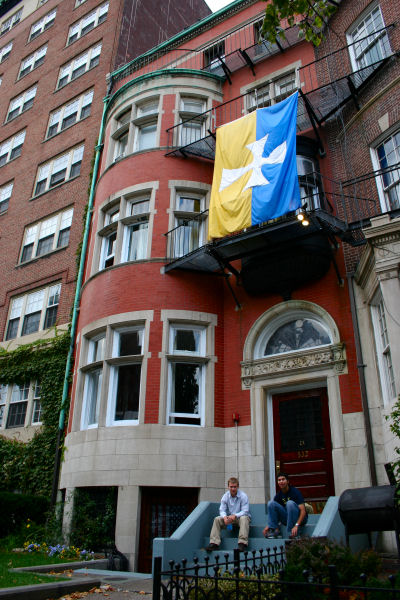
**Sigma Chi's Alpha Theta chapter house at MIT, 2004**

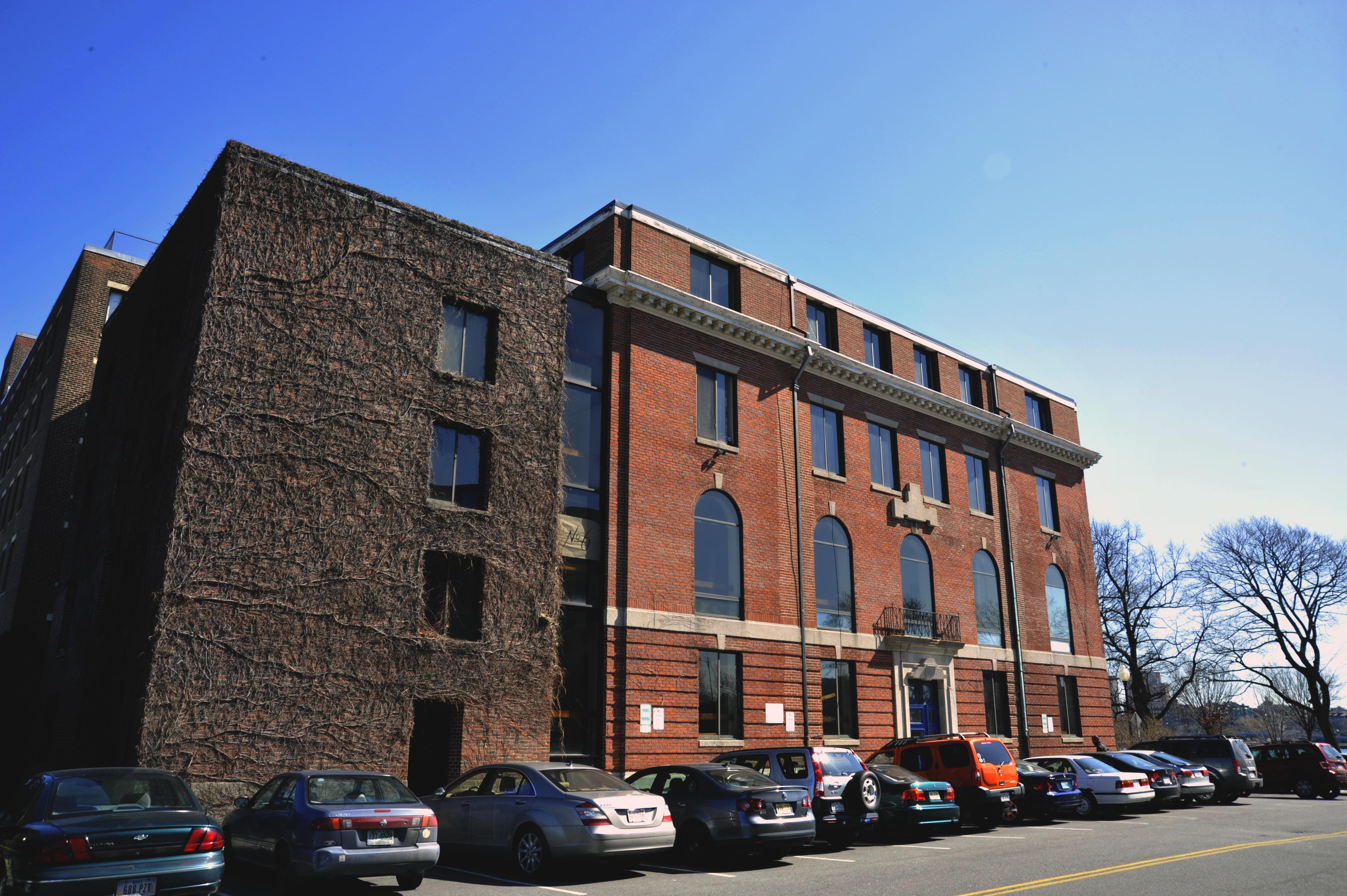
**"Number Six Club" (St. Anthony Hall Tau chapter) at MIT, 2004**

**Theta Chi's Beta chapter house at MIT, 2008**

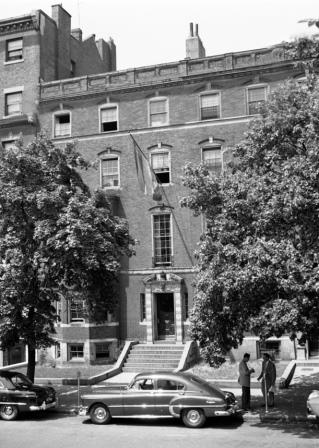
**Phi Sigma Kappa's Omicron chapter house at MIT, circa 1940s**

== Sororities ==
As of the fall of 2023, 23 percent of MIT's female students belong to a sorority. The sororities, listed below with dates of local founding and national conference membership, are women's organizations that voluntarily coordinate their efforts within MIT's Panhellenic Association (PHA). For convenience, the term "sorority" is used throughout, though some of these organizations are "women's fraternities," and were so named before the popularization of the term sorority. The terms are synonymous.

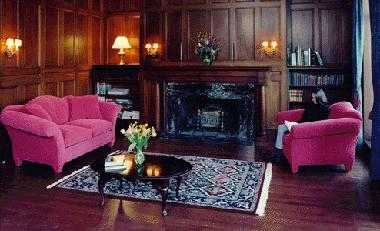
Interior of ΑΧΩ's Theta Omicron chapter house at MIT

Sorority properties are generally owned or leased by a chapter's alumni club, though some chapters do not have housing. As part of PHA or national organization self-governance, or University disciplinary action, chapters may be suspended (de-recognized) or closed for a time. If a chapter is closed and/or forfeits its housing, it will be listed as a dormant chapter.

In the following lists, if a chapter is closed, it will be grouped under inactive chapters, italicized, while active chapters or those suspended for a brief time are in bold. Following are the sororities and women's fraternities at MIT, with National Panhellenic Conference indicated by NPC.

=== Active sorority chapters ===
- **ΑΦ** - Alpha Phi, 1984 (NPC) (Note: Called "A Phi", this is ΑΦ's Zeta Phi chapter, located at 477-479 Commonwealth Ave., Boston, MA. The letter "Phi" in this sorority's name is pronounced in the Greek fashion, as "Fee", and not anglicized as "Fye", common among other groups.)
- **ΑΧΩ** - Alpha Chi Omega, 1986 (NPC) (Note: Called "A Chi O or Alpha Chi", this is ΑΧΩ's Theta Omicron chapter, residing at 478 Commonwealth Ave., Boston, MA.)
- **ΣΚ** - Sigma Kappa, 1989 (NPC) (Note: Called "SK", this is ΣΚ's Theta Lambda chapter, located at 480 Commonwealth Ave., Boston, MA.)
- **ΚΑΘ** - Kappa Alpha Theta, 1991 (NPC) (Note: Called "Theta", this is ΚΑΘ's Zeta Mu chapter, located at Green Hall, 350 Memorial Drive, Cambridge, MA.)
- **ΠΒΦ** - Pi Beta Phi, 2008 (NPC) (Note: Called Pi Phi, this is ΠΒΦ's Massachusetts Gamma chapter, located at 405 Memorial Drive, Cambridge, MA.)
- **ΔΦΕ** - Delta Phi Epsilon, 2015 (NPC) (Note: Called "D Phi E", this is ΔΦΕ's Zeta Delta chapter, located at 515 Beacon Street, Boston MA.)

=== Sororities chapters with name changes ===
- ΗΣΜ - Eta Sigma Mu (local), 1890–1895, became The Cleofan. (Note: Originally a secret society "with a musical nature," within a few years ΗΣΜ "thought best to give up the secrecy and to welcome all young women who cared to join." Its new name was an Anglo-Saxon word meaning "Club". The group offered a Friday Tea each week for the relatively few women enrolled at Tech at the time. Non-residential, no longer Greek-lettered, and no longer tracked on this page, Cleofan lasted until at least 1937.)
- Bon 3 Club (local), 1968–2014, became **ΧΛΜ**
- Club Amherst (local), 1981–1984, became **ΑΦ**
- The Thalians (local), 1985–1986, became **ΑΧΩ**
- ΣΙΦ - Sigma Iota Phi (local), 1992–1995, became **ΑΕΦ**

=== Inactive sorority chapters ===
Following are the inactive sororities and women's fraternities at MIT.

- ΑΕΦ - Alpha Epsilon Phi, 1995–2022 (NPC) (Note: Called "A E Phi", this was ΑΕΦ's Beta Epsilon chapter had been non-residential for some time before closure.)
- ΧΛΜ - Chi Lambda Mu, aka Clam, 2014-201x co-ed (Note: This is the MIT area chapter of Chi Lambda Mu. The MIT chapter, often called "Clam", is a co-ed sorority located at 290 Massachusetts Avenue, Cambridge, Massachusetts.)

== Multicultural Greek Council ==
Originally ethnic or language-affiliated, these organizations are now fully integrated, as are MIT's general Greek letter organizations and ILGs. They make up the fourth Greek Council within FSILG. Their historical affiliation may be reviewed by reading their local or national histories. Some of the men's groups also participate in IFC events, and the women's groups in PHA events.

Multicultural Greek Council (MGC) chapters are non-residential and often serve several schools in the Boston area. Additional schools are listed in the references for each group. They may or may not be under the authority of the Office of FSILG. Further, the historically Black Greek associations (NPHC and NPC) have adopted a heightened focus on alumni and adult programming, usually with distinct alumni chapters that also exist locally. On the MIT campus, the inter-Greek councils will, as needed, cooperate on programs and policies, as do individual chapters from among the several Greek councils.

Following are the active MGC fraternities and sororities at MIT, listed by date of local founding and national conference membership, these are either men's or women's organizations, voluntarily coordinating their efforts within the larger Multicultural Greek Council (MGC). In the following lists, if a chapter is closed, it will be grouped under inactive chapters, italicized, while active chapters or those suspended for a brief time are in bold.

(NALFO) indicates members of the National Association of Latino Fraternal Organizations;
(NAPA) indicates members of the National APIDA Panhellenic Association;
(NPHC) indicates members of the National Pan-Hellenic Council;
(NPC) indicates members of the National Panhellenic Conference.

=== Active cultural fraternity chapters ===
- **ΩΨΦ** - Omega Psi Phi, 1916 (NPHC), African American (Note: Established in 1916.)
- **ΚΑΨ** - Kappa Alpha Psi, 1975 (NPHC) and (NIC) (Note: This is the Theta Iota chapter of ΚΑΨ.)
- **ΑΦΑ** - Alpha Phi Alpha, 1989 (NPHC) and (NIC)
- **ΛΥΛ** - Lambda Upsilon Lambda, 1994 (NALFO), Latino (Note: MIT's Nu chapter of ΛΥΛ was established on March 5, 1994. This non-residential chapter supports students from MIT, Tufts University, Harvard University, Boston College, and Northeastern University.)

=== Active cultural sorority chapters ===
- **ΑΚΑ** - Alpha Kappa Alpha, 1977 (NPHC) (Note: This is ΑΚΑ's Lambda Upsilon chapter, often called "AKA". It is a city-wide chapter, serving MIT, Harvard University, and Wellesley College.)
- **ΔΣΘ** - Delta Sigma Theta, 1980 (NPHC) (Note: This is ΔΣΘ's Xi Tau chapter, often called the "Deltas". This is a city-wide chapter, serving Babson College, Bentley University, Brandeis University, Harvard University, Lesley University, Massachusetts Institute of Technology, Tufts University, and Wellesley College.)

=== Inactive historically cultural fraternity chapters (Note: These existed before the formation of the IFC and MGC. It's a judgment call: mid-1900s-era Jewish chapters would normally caucus with the IFC groups, self-identifying as such. The early Latin-American groups were likewise listed, but today would align with the MGC groups, as their modern successors or peers have done. Because of this, and the hint provided by successor national ΦΙΑ and other NALFO nationals, they have been inserted among the MGC groups.) ===
- ΨΑΚ - Psi Alpha Kappa, 1901–1904, Latin American (Note: Installed in 1901, this was the Alpha chapter of Massachusetts and the second chapter of ΨΑΚ, the nation's first intercollegiate Latin American fraternity. It is noted in the MIT Technique yearbook, 1903 edition, p.112. The chapter dissolved, and members joined other campus fraternities (ΘΞ) or dining clubs. It referenced itself as "Latin American", not "Latino".)
- ΠΔΦ - Pi Delta Phi (local), 1916–1921, Latin-American, became ΦΛΑ (see ΦΙΑ) (Note: Syntax note: Nationally this fraternity experienced a second merger in 1931, and is so noted by the "(see ΦΙΑ)" remark. But it may not have survived into this third phase. Also, it called itself "Latin-American" and not "Hispanic" or "Latino".)
- ΦΛΑ - Phi Lambda Alpha, 1921-1931?, Latin-American, became ΦΙΑ (Note: This was the Beta chapter of the fraternity. It may not have survived the 1931 merger to form ΦΙΑ. It referenced itself as "Latin-American" and not "Latino")

== Professional fraternities and sororities ==
Professional societies emphasize developing skills in a specific major or field of study over social life. Membership includes both students and faculty of a specific field. Professional Fraternity Association members are indicated by PFA.

=== Inactive professional fraternity chapters ===
The following professional fraternities formerly operated at MIT.

- ΑΧΣ - Alpha Chi Sigma, 1919–1954, 19??–2009 (PFA), chemistry (Note: This was the Alpha Zeta chapter of ΑΧΣ.)
- Scarab, 1921–?, architecture, national disbanded. (Note: MIT's is the Luxor Temple of the fraternity. Its chapters are called temples.)
- ΚΗΚ - Kappa Eta Kappa, 1924–1944 (PFA), electrical engineering, computer engineering or computer science (Note: This was the Epsilon chapter of ΚΗΚ, inactive since World War II.)
- ΦΣΡ - Phi Sigma Rho, 2021-2025, women's engineering (Note: MIT's Alpha Chi chapter of Phi Sigma Rho sorority has opted to join the IFC as their 45-chapter national is not a member of the NPC.)
- ΘΤ - Theta Tau, 1912–1930, 2016-2025 (PFA), engineering (Note: This is MIT's Technology/Eta chapter of ΘΤ. A professional fraternity, it nevertheless caucuses with the IFC on the MIT campus.) (Note: Reference MIT's Technology/Eta chapter of ΘΤ is MIT's first Professional Engineering Fraternity in nearly 100 years, a member of the Professional Fraternity Association (PFA). The fraternity was installed on May 23, 1912. ΘΤ's Eta chapter was colonized as a non-residential professional fraternity and remained active until 1930, when pressures of the Great Depression caused membership to dwindle. The organization subsequently became inactive. Meanwhile, the 120-year-old MIT chapter of ΔΥ failed in 2014. Its alumni association held on to their building, at 526 Beacon St, Boston, MA, a home they had owned for over 100 years. In 2016, this same Technology Chapter Alumni Association endorsed the revival of the Eta chapter of ΘΤ with a new group of energized students and sponsored the formation of the Technology/Eta colony of ΘΤ in April 2016. The colony was subsequently promoted to Chapter status one year later.)

== Honor and recognition fraternities ==
Honor Societies indicate achievement on a graduate's résumé.

Honor societies recognize students who excel academically or as leaders among their peers, usually within a specific academic discipline. In the following lists, if a chapter is closed, it will be grouped under inactive chapters, italicized, while active chapters or those suspended for a brief time are in bold. Following are the honor societies at MIT, with members of the Association of College Honor Societies indicated by ACHS.

=== Active honor society chapters ===
- **ΤΒΠ** - Tau Beta Pi, 1922 (ACHS), engineering honors
- **ΧΕ** - Chi Epsilon, 1928 (ACHS), civil engineering honors
- **ΣΠ** - Sigma Xi, 1934, graduate science and engineering honors
- **ΗΚΝ** - Eta Kappa Nu 1939, IEEE affiliation, electrical engineering, computer engineering honors
- **ΠΤΣ** - Pi Tau Sigma, 1947 (ACHS), mechanical engineering honors
- **ΦΛΥ** - Phi Lambda Upsilon, 1955 (ACHS), chemistry honors
- **ΦΒΚ** - Phi Beta Kappa, 1971, academic honors
- **ΑΝΣ** - Alpha Nu Sigma, 1980?, nuclear energy honors
- **ΣΠΣ** - Sigma Pi Sigma, 1983 (ACHS), physics honors
- **National fraternity key societies** - There are dozens of these, scholarship honors (Note: Offered to members and alumni of national academic and social fraternities and sororities, fraternity or sorority academic key societies provide a subtle way of noting fraternity membership on a résumé and alerting readers to academic achievement. The first fraternal scholarship was offered by Phi Kappa Sigma beginning in 1888, and Sigma Chi was the first to develop an educational foundation in 1939. "Most fraternities and sororities have done likewise," according to Baird's. Members and prospective members can contact any of the national HQ or educational foundations for more information.)

=== Inactive honor society chapters ===
- ΔΣΡ-ΤΚΑ - Delta Sigma Rho-Tau Kappa Alpha, 1956, forensics honors
- ΠΔΕ - Pi Delta Epsilon, 1910–1927+, journalism honors (see the Society for Collegiate Journalists) (Note: first appears in the 1915 MIT Technique yearbook, p.279. Its national merged with ΑΦΓ to form the Society for Collegiate Journalists in 1975.)
- Triglyph, 1921-1927+, architectural honors
- ΣΑΒ - Sigma Alpha Beta (local), 1923–19xx ?, military honors
- ΑΣΔ - Alpha Sigma Delta, 1924–1927+, radio communication honors (Note: 1925 MIT Technique yearbook, p.253.)
- ΔΩ - Delta Omega, 1924–1944, public health honors
- Scabbard and Blade, 1924–20xx ? (ACHS), military honors
- Mortar and Ball, 1925–1933+, Coast Artillery honors (Note: MIT's Battery B., First Regiment)
- Angel Flight, 19xx ?–19xx ?, auxiliary to Arnold Air Society, became Silver Wings
- Arnold Air Society (A-1), 19xx ?–20xx ?, Air Force cadet honors (Note: MIT's is the Lt Colonel Jay Zeamer Squadron, located at 77 Massachusetts Ave., Cambridge, MA)
- ΣΔΨ - Sigma Delta Psi, 1966–xxxx ?, disbanded national athletics honorary
- Order of Omega, 1992–201x ?, Greek Life leadership honors (Note: This was the Mu Zeta chapter of Order of Omega, installed February 7, 1992. Per the national website.)

== Service fraternities ==
Service fraternities were formed with the intent of providing campus and community service. These organizations are self-governed. Following are the service fraternities at MIT. PFA indicates current or past membership in the Professional Fraternity Association.

- ΑΦΩ - Alpha Phi Omega, 1936, co-ed (PFA)

== See also ==
- Campus of the Massachusetts Institute of Technology
- Housing at the Massachusetts Institute of Technology
- Cultural interest fraternities and sororities
- List of senior societies
- List of social fraternities
- List of social sororities and women's fraternities
- Professional fraternities and sororities
- Traditions and student activities at MIT
