= Racism in United States college fraternities and sororities =

Aspect of American Greek life system

Racism in United States college fraternities and sororities encompasses the race based discrimination that exists in American Greek life. Examples of discrimination that racial minorites face include stereotyping, slurs, and stigmatization from peers.

== History ==
Black college fraternities dates as far back as 1903. Members of other racial groups began to form their own fraternities and sororities. In 1912, the first Latino fraternity, Sigma Iota, was founded at Louisiana State University; in 1931, it merged to form Phi Iota Alpha, the oldest Latino fraternity. In 1948, the first MGLO fraternity was founded at the University of Toledo and the first Latina sorority were founded in 1975. In 1981, the first MGLO sorority was founded at Rutgers University. More MGLOs were founded “nationally and locally” the following years to continue as a “foundation transcending racial, national, and religious differences”. Soon after, Multicultural Greek Councils were formed to govern affiliated MGLOs, both national or local fraternities and sororities.

By the end of the 1960s, White Greek Life Organizations (WGLOs) eliminated official policies that prohibited race-based membership. However abolishing these clauses did not prevent GLOs from using other means of maintaining racist and exclusive practices. Following the elimination of explicitly racist policies, Greek organizations sustained their racist practices through more informal means of discrimination. This is often seen through forms of de facto segregation, white supremacist overtones at Greek parties and events, mock “slave auctions”, and accounts of white fraternity members dressing in “blackface”. For instance, several white fraternities have been found building homecoming floats with racist themes, staging racist skits, and holding parties with racist themes. Furthermore, in terms of de facto segregation, despite eliminating racially exclusionary policies, many white Greek life organizations failed to actively pursue and promote new members of color. Therefore, lack of diversity within Greek Life organizations remains relatively unchanged.

People of color continue to feel marginalized within these organizations. Because the foundations of Greek life were built on biased practices, WGLOs continue to provide a structure that enforces euro-centrism and conformity among its members. Although Greek systems today are not divided into separate racial categories, GLOs are still viewed as the desirable option when it comes to seeking membership, because they historically have had more access to resources and networking opportunities that people in non-white GLOs do not. At the present moment, WGLOs are pressured to integrate people of color, but they do so under conditions that they set themselves. This puts those people of color wanting to join in positions where they both have to “perform” and embrace their ethnic differences, while trying to assimilate to traditional practices that encourage homogeneity.

== Contemporary incidents ==
People of color face wide-ranging forms of discrimination in Greek life. From simple acts of discrimination such as racial slurs being thrown around in songs, to hazing-related incidents, racism is still prevalent in Greek life. Members of color see white peers use blackface as a form of humor and they are more harshly judged when they do not participate in events that are incongruent with their personal beliefs. The use of blackface as a form of humor or entertainment has a lasting legacy in all aspects of American society, including Greek Life. This legacy stretches from Mark Twain’s fondness for shows with performers in blackface to current Halloween costumes. Another example of the racialized experiences that members of color face are when Hispanic members of WGLOs feel as though they are being labeled as lazy if they chose not to participate in networking opportunities. Labels like these are products of racial stereotypes about Hispanic people. Greek organizations did not develop this exclusivity over time, they were founded on it.

GLOs for decades have formed multicultural and ethnically specific councils and organizations, in an attempt to control their own organizations. The purpose of Multicultural Greek Life Organizations (MGLOs) is to promote cultural group identity and to create spaces that are more conducive to the advancement of cultural interest groups, including Asian Americans and Latin Americans. For example, in 1930, the National Pan-Hellenic Council was formed to further the interest of black fraternities and sororities during an era when the white fraternities and sororities practiced racial and religious segregation.

In 2020, college students and alumni across the nation started "Abolish Greek Life" Instagram accounts discussing how the Greek system at their respective colleges promote racism, antisemitism, xenophobia, homophobia, transphobia, sexism, classism, elitism, exploitation, alcohol abuse, drug abuse, and rape culture. People following and promoting these accounts want to abolish Greek life because they feel every attempt to reform it has failed.

== Greek organizations associated with racist incidents ==
- Kappa Gamma, Gallaudet University
- Sigma Alpha Epsilon, University of Oklahoma
- Kappa Kappa Gamma, University of New Mexico
- Alpha Chi Rho, Syracuse University was alleged, but is contested in civil court.
- Alpha Kappa Alpha, Howard University

== See also ==
- Cultural interest fraternities and sororities
- The Machine (social group)
- List of African-American fraternities and sororities
