= List of Sigma Iota Alpha chapters =

Sigma Iota Alpha or Hermandad de Sigma Iota Alpha, Incorporated, is a Latina-oriented Greek letter intercollegiate sorority. It was founded in 1990 at SUNY Albany, SUNY Stony Brook, SUNY New Paltz, and Rensselaer Polytechnic Institute.

== Collegiate chapters ==
In the following list, active chapters are indicated in bold and inactive chapters are shown in italics.

| Chapter | Charter date and range | Institution | Location | Status | Ref. |
|---|---|---|---|---|---|
| **Alpha** | September 29, 1990 | University at Albany, SUNY | Albany, New York | Active | |
| Beta | 1990 | Stony Brook University | Stony Brook, New York | Inactive | |
| Gamma | 1990 | State University of New York at New Paltz | New Paltz, New York | Inactive | |
| Delta | 1992 | Western Illinois University | Macomb, Illinois | Inactive | |
| Epsilon | 1992 | Adelphi University | Garden City, New York | Inactive | |
| Zeta | 1992 | Hofstra University | Hempstead, New York | Inactive | |
| Eta | 1992 | Pennsylvania State University | State College, Pennsylvania | Inactive | |
| **Theta** | 1993 | State University of New York at Old Westbury | Old Westbury, New York | Active | |
| **Iota** | 1993 | Northeastern Illinois University | Chicago, Illinois | Active | |
| **Iota** | 1993 | Roosevelt University | Chicago, Illinois | Active | |
| **Iota** | 1993 | University of Illinois at Chicago | Chicago, Illinois | Active | |
| Kappa | 1990 | Rensselaer Polytechnic Institute | Troy, New York | Inactive | |
| Lambda | 1993 | State University of New York at Oswego | Oswego, New York | Inactive | |
| Mu | 1993 | Temple University | Philadelphia, New York | Inactive | |
| Nu | 1994 | Union College | Schenectady, New York | Inactive | |
| Xi | 1996 | LIU Post | Brookville, New York | Inactive | |
| Omicron | 1996 | Boston College | Boston, Massachusetts | Inactive | |
| Omicron | 1996 | Boston University | Boston, Massachusetts | Inactive | |
| Omicron | 1996 | Suffolk University | Boston, Massachusetts | Inactive | |
| Pi | 1996 | Harvard University | Cambridge, Massachusetts | Inactive | |
| Pi | 1996 | Massachusetts Institute of Technology | Cambridge, Massachusetts | Inactive | |
| Rho | 1996–2018, 20xx ? | Syracuse University | Syracuse, New York | Inactive | (Note: In September 2018, Sigma Iota Alpha was suspended from the Syracuse campus for violations of the Student Code of Conduct.) |
| Sigma | 1996 | Marist College | Poughkeepsie, New York | Inactive | |
| Tau | 1996 | Montclair State University | Jersey City, New Jersey | Inactive | |
| Tau | 1996 | Saint Peter's University | Montclair, New Jersey | Inactive | |
| Tau | 1996 | Seton Hall University | South Orange, New Jersey | Inactive | |
| **Upsilon** | April 13, 1997 | University of Illinois at Urbana–Champaign | Champaign, Illinois | Active | |
| **Phi** | 1997 | New York University | New York City, New York | Active | |
| **Chi** | 1997 | University of Maryland, College Park | College Park, Maryland | Active | |
| Psi | 1997 | Lewis University | Romeoville, Illinois | Inactive | |
| Omega | 1997 | Northern Illinois University | DeKalb, Illinois | Inactive | |
| Alpha Alpha (Prime) | 1998–2019 | College of New Rochelle | New Rochelle, New York | Moved | (Note: Chapter was established at the College of New Rochelle, which was absorbed by Mercy College in 2019.) |
| Alpha Beta | 1999 | Columbia University | New York City, New York | Inactive | |
| **Alpha Gamma** | 1999 | Binghamton University | Binghamton, New York | Active | |
| Alpha Delta | 2000 | Stockton University | Galloway Township, New Jersey | Inactive | |
| **Alpha Epsilon** | 2000 | James Madison University | Harrisonburg, Virginia | Active | |
| **Alpha Zeta** | 2002 | California State University, Dominguez Hills | Carson, California | Active | |
| Alpha Eta | 2004 | Baylor University | Waco, Texas | Inactive | |
| Alpha Theta | 2004 | St. John's University | New York City, New York | Inactive | |
| Alpha Iota | 2004 | Rutgers University–New Brunswick | New Brunswick, New Jersey | Inactive | |
| Alpha Kappa | 2004 | Michigan State University | East Lansing, Michigan | Inactive | |
| **Alpha Lambda** | 2005 | University of New Haven | West Haven, Connecticut | Active | |
| Alpha Mu | 2008 | University of Massachusetts Dartmouth | Dartmouth, Massachusetts | Inactive | |
| Alpha Nu | 2008 | Pace University | New York City, New York | Inactive | |
| Alpha Xi | 2010 | Florida State University | Tallahassee, Florida | Inactive | |
| **Alpha Omicron** | 2010 | Virginia Tech | Blacksburg, Virginia | Active | |
| Alpha Pi | 2010 | University of Texas at San Antonio | San Antonio, Texas | Inactive | |
| Alpha Rho | 2010 | Rutgers University–Newark | Newark, New Jersey | Inactive | |
| **Alpha Sigma** | 2010 | Florida Gulf Coast University | Fort Myers, Florida | Active | |
| **Alpha Tau** | 2011 | Georgia Southern University | Statesboro, Georgia | Active | |
| Alpha Upsilon | 2011 | Texas State University | San Marcos, Texas | Inactive | |
| Alpha Phi | 2011 | Utica College | Utica, New York | Inactive | |
| Alpha Chi | 2011 | University of Texas at Austin | Austin, Texas | Inactive | |
| Alpha Psi | 2011 | University of Massachusetts Amherst | Amherst, Massachusetts | Inactive | |
| Alpha Omega | - | | | Memorial | |
| Beta Alpha | 2010 | Georgia Southern University–Armstrong Campus | Savannah, Georgia | Inactive | |
| **Beta Beta** | 2011 | University of Arkansas | Fayetteville, Arkansas | Active | |
| Beta Gamma | 2012 | Stephen F. Austin State University | Nacogdoches, Texas | Inactive | |
| **Beta Delta** | 2013–2017; 20xx ?–2019, 2021 | College of William & Mary | Williamsburg, Virginia | Active | (Note: The William & Mary chapter temporarily lost recognition from the university in 2017 for hazing. The national sorority closed the chapter in 2019 although this decision was later reversed.) |
| **Beta Epsilon** | 2015 | City College of New York | New York City, New York | Active | |
| **Beta Epsilon** | 2015 | John Jay College of Criminal Justice | New York City, New York | Active | |
| **Beta Epsilon** | 2015 | Lehman College | New York City, New York | Active | |
| **Beta Epsilon** | 2015 | New York Institute of Technology | New York City, New York | Active | |
| **Beta Epsilon** | 2015 | Mercy College | New York City, New York | Active | |
| **Beta Zeta** | 2014 | Johns Hopkins University | Baltimore, Maryland | Active | |
| **Beta Eta** | 2014 | Clemson University | Clemson, South Carolina | Active | |
| Beta Theta | 2016 | Brooklyn College | Brooklyn, New York | Inactive | |
| Beta Iota | 2016 | LIU Brooklyn | Brooklyn, New York | Inactive | |
| **Beta Kappa** | 2016 | University of Central Arkansas | Conway, Arkansas | Active | |
| **Beta Lambda** | 2018 | Texas A&M University | College Station, Texas | Active | |
| Alpha Alpha | 2019 | Mercy College | Dobbs Ferry, New York | Inactive | |
| **Beta Mu** | 2020 | Towson University | Towson, Maryland | Active | |
| **Beta Nu** | 2014 | Southern Connecticut State | New Haven, Connecticut | Active | |
| **Beta Xi** | April 28, 2021 | Arkansas State University | Jonesboro, Arkansas | Active | |
| **Beta Omicron** | May 3, 2003 | New York Institute of Technology | Old Westbury, New York | Active | |
| **Beta Pi** | 2022 | McDaniel College | Westminster, Maryland | Active | (Note: Colony was established in 2022.) |
| **Beta Rho** | | Florida Atlantic University | Boca Raton, Florida | Active | |
| | | Augusta University | Augusta, Georgia | Colony | (Note: Colony was established in 2016.) |
| | | Albion College | Albion, Michigan | Colony | |
| | | Arkansas Tech University | Russellville, Arkansas | Colony | (Note: Colony was established in 2024.) |

== Alumnae chapters ==
| Chapter | Established | Area served | Status | Ref. |
|---|---|---|---|---|
| Gamma Alpha | 2003 | Washington, D.C. | Active | |
| Gamma Beta | 2005 | Chicago | Active | |
| Gamma Gamma | 2007 | New York/New Jersey Metropolitan | Active | |
| Gamma Delta | 2007 | North/Central Florida | Active | |
| Gamma Epsilon | 2007 | Long Island/Queens | Active | |
| Gamma Zeta | 2008 | New England | Active | |
| Gamma Eta | 2008 | New York Capital/Upstate | Active | |
| Gamma Theta | 2009 | Bronx/Westchester | Active | |
| Gamma Iota | 2009 | Greater Los Angeles | Active | |
| Gamma Kappa | 2013 | Georgia/South | Active | |
| Gamma Lambda | 2013 | South/Central Texas | Active | |
| Gamma Mu | 2016 | Arkansas | Active | |
| Gamma Nu | 2019 | Miami/South Florida | Active | |
