= Clemson University fraternities and sororities =

Clemson University Fraternities and Sororities
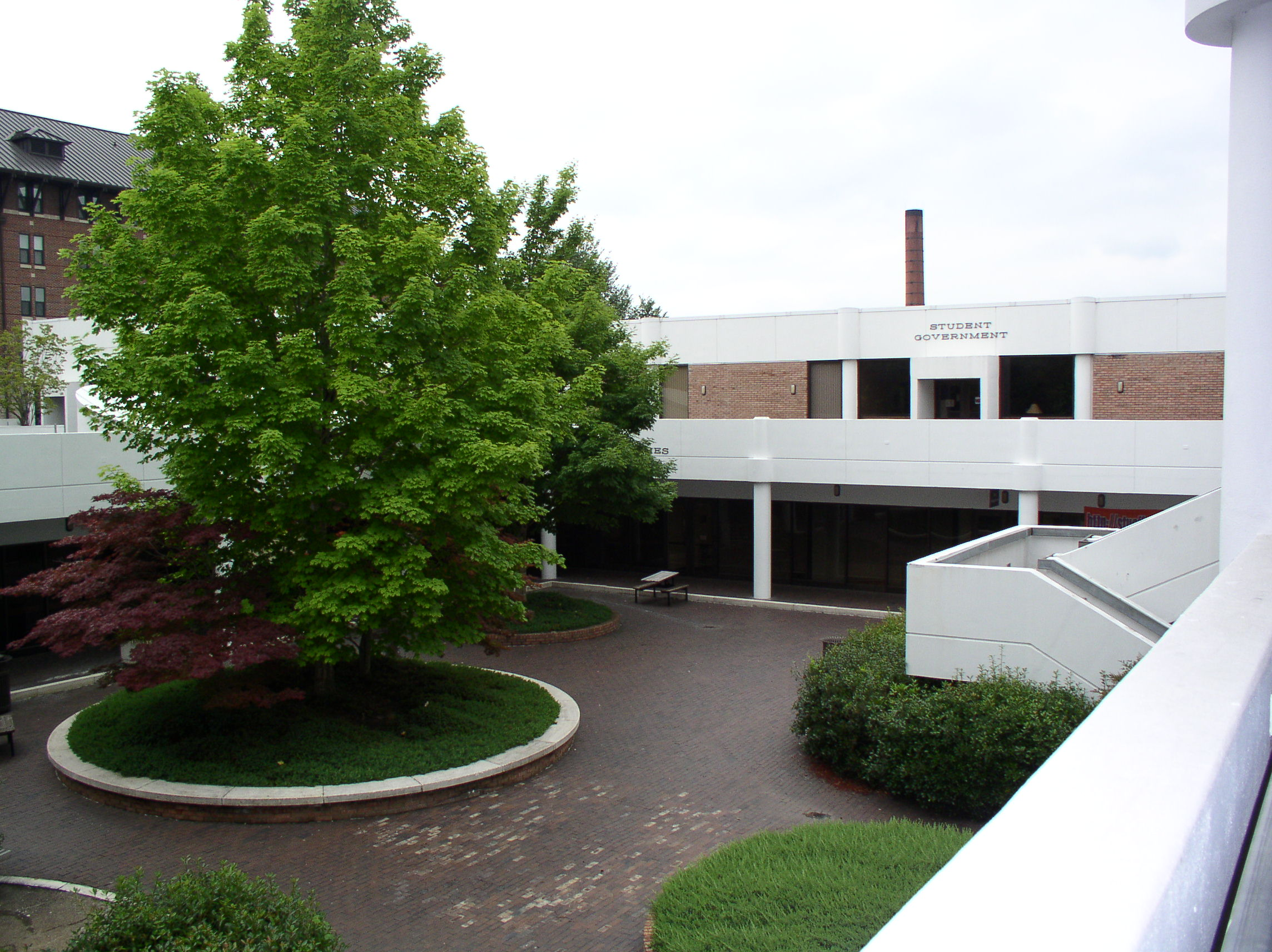
- The Student Union where the Greek Life office used to be housed
- Type: Fraternities; Sororities
- Headquarters: Clemson, South Carolina
- Location: United States
- Website: www.clemson.edu/campus-life/fraternity-sorority-life/about.html

Clemson University opened in 1893 as an all-male military college. It was not until seventy years later in 1959 that the first fraternities and sororities arrived on campus. In the 1970s, they became recognized as national fraternities and sororities. Clemson's Greek Life roster has now increased to 44 chapters on campus: fraternities and sororities from the National Panhellenic Conference, the North American Interfraternity Conference, the Multicultural Greek Council, and the National Pan-Hellenic Council.

The Greek Life office is located in Norris Hall. Of the 22,698 enrolled undergraduate students, 18% of males are involved in fraternities while 32% of females are involved in sororities Affiliated men and women have shown to have a higher GPA than nonaffiliated men and women. Clemson University Greek Life is unique because Greeks do not have houses on campus but live in separate residence halls. However many fraternities operate large off-campus houses in or near the North Clemson Neighborhood adjacent to campus. These houses roughly fall between 3000sqft-6500sqft and typically house 6-10 persons in full apartment style housing. The restriction on fraternity housing is due to a Clemson city ordinance which prohibits more than 3 unrelated persons from living in the same house/apartment within Clemson city limits (most of the fraternity houses were grandfathered into this rule). Most social functions hosted by fraternities happen at these large off campus houses and most of these functions are multi-fraternity sponsored (fraternities at Clemson tend to socialize with each other more than at other equivalent Universities). Sororities host numerous mixers/functions at bars and various locales in the Clemson downtown area. Popular off-campus activities that Greek life regularly and widely attend include Mountain Weekends (fall trips to mountain cabins hosted separately as a date function by each fraternity), Formals (fraternities usually host formal at a beach front location or large city while sororities tend to rent out ballrooms in the local upstate South Carolina area) and Carolina Cup (semi-annual horse race in spring in Camden, SC).

== History ==
Clemson was originally founded as a military college. By 1955, civilians had arrived on campus, and soon, fraternities and sororities were an idea in demand. In 1959, The Board of Trustees approved the development of the first sororities and fraternities. The idea was recommended to them by Walter Cox and the President at the time, Robert C. Edwards. Eight men's fraternities and two sororities were founded between 1956-1966. The fraternities/sororities operated under local names until 1970 when Clemson allowed national Greek organizations on campus. In 1956 the Numeral Society (Sigma Alpha Epsilon) was the first fraternity established on campus. From 1958 to 1966, seven more fraternities were recognized by the university, in order of founding: (national affiliation shown in parentheses): Phi Kappa Delta (Kappa Alpha Order), 'Deacons' Delta Kappa Alpha (Alpha Tau Omega), Kappa Delta Chi (Sigma Nu), 'Zetas' Sigma Alpha Zeta (Pi Kappa Alpha), 'Snappers' Kappa Sigma Nu (Kappa Sigma), Delta Phi (Phi Delta Theta), and Sigma Kappa Epsilon (Beta Theta Pi). Followed by Alpha Gamma (Sigma Phi Epsilon & Alpha Gamma Rho) and Phi Gamma Delta (Fiji) in 1971 and Chi Lam (Theta Chi) in 1974. Chi Chi Chi, was the first sorority later changing their name to Delta Theta Chi (Delta Delta Delta). The second sorority was Omicron Zeta Tau (Kappa Kappa Gamma) followed soon after by Sigma Beta Chi. By 1969 three local sororities and 9 local fraternities could be found on campus. The organizations urged the right to be affiliate with the national organizations and sought help from Dean Delony. On February 1, 1970, Zetas (Pi Kappa Alpha) became first nationally recognized fraternity on Clemson's campus followed soon after by Phi Kappa Delta (Kappa Alpha Order). Sigma Beta Chi choose to affiliate with Chi Omega, Delta Theta Chi with Delta Delta Delta and Omicron Zeta Tau with Kappa Kappa Gamma. These sororities would become the first three national sororities on campus. Delony choose to house the affiliated women in their own dorms instead of building sorority and fraternity houses. The sororities continued to grow in number, the fourth sorority being Kappa Alpha Theta followed by Alpha Delta Pi, Alpha Kappa Alpha and Pi Beta Phi.

== Government ==
=== College Panhellenic Association ===
The Panhellenic Council is the governing body for all National Panhellenic Conference (NPC) organizations on campus. It is made up of delegates of all 14 sororities of Clemson University representing 1,500 women. Panhellenic sororities participate in rush once a year in the fall semester usually 1–2 weeks into the start of the academic year. Panhellenic strives for "commitment to academics and service and our strong student presence in campus wide organizations and leadership positions." There are six executive board members consisting of the president, Vice President, Vice President of Public Relations and Programming, Vice President of Finance and Education, Vice President of Recruitment, and the Assistant Vice President of Recruitment. The president and delegate from each chapter must attend meetings every other week.

Panhellenic supports the Circle Of Sisterhood Foundation, whose mission is to lift women in need from poverty, during Panhellenic recruitment. New members have the chance to help philanthropically through Junior Panhellenic. Junior Panhellenic plans a new member gala to raise money to train a dog for a local family through the Dogs for Autism organization. MARYS House (Ministry Alliance for Regaining Your Safety) is the service project Panhellenic works on throughout the school year. It is a shelter for those who have experienced domestic violence located in Pickens County.

=== Interfraternity Council ===
The Interfraternity Council (IFC) is the governing body of fraternities on Clemson's campus representing fraternities from the North American Interfraternity Conference. The Interfraternity Council is made up of about 2,000 men. IFC fraternities participate in rush twice a year in the fall and spring usually 1–2 weeks into each respective semester. Similar to the Panhellenic Council, IFC consist of seven executive positions: President, Vice President, Director of Philanthropy and Public Relations, Director of Membership, Director of Recruitment, Director of Finance and Vice President of Risk Management. The Clemson Interfraternity Council website can be accessed here. The council consist of representatives from all 24 chapters.

=== National Pan-Hellenic Council ===
The first National Pan-Hellenic Council organization chartered on the campus of Clemson University was Omega Psi Phi fraternity in 1974. In 1979 the first NPHC sorority chartered was Alpha Kappa Alpha. Currently there are eight NPHC organizations active on campus. The National Pan-Hellenic Council's members participate in several service and philanthropic events. Each year the National Pan-Hellenic Council hosts the Fall Fest step show and week of service. The NPHC on campus is made up of over 100 men and women.

=== Multicultural Greek Council ===
This council is made up of five executive members and governs sororities and fraternities that are traditionally based on multicultural values. Greek organizations under this branch are made up of students that focus on inclusion and celebrations of culture. Students in these sororities and fraternities work to spread awareness of Asian and Latino culture and to promote appreciation of diversity.

=== Greek Programming Board ===
The Greek Programming Board's purpose is to unite the entire Greek life on campus and in the community including the Collegiate Panhellenic Council, the Interfraternity Council and the National Pan-Hellenic Council and to endorse and advance Greek Life. The Greek Programming Board is in charge of hosting the annual Greek week competition. The board also holds trivia night to raise money for the red cross.

== Order of Omega ==
Order of Omega is a Greek honors society consisting of the top 3% of the Greek community. Order of Omega sponsors activities such as the Clemson Cup Speech Competition, Holiday Wishes Toy Drive and the Annual Fraternity and Sorority Life Awards Banquet.

== Housing ==
Clemson University currently does not offer sorority and fraternity houses on campus but does set apart certain residence halls for Greeks. Several fraternities and sororities live on the Quad, a residential area located near the football stadium. The other sororities live in the Barnett and Smith residence halls in an area commonly referred to as "the horseshoe." Members of Greek organizations who do not live in the hall have card access to the residence halls in which their brothers or sisters are housed. Some fraternities lease large (3000 sqft - 6500 sqft) houses in the North Clemson neighborhood adjacent to campus as a pseudo-chapter house and utilize them for social purposes.

== List of Chapters ==
=== College Panhellenic Association Sororities ===
List of the 14 active organizations within the College Panhellenic Association at Clemson University.

Organization	Chapter	Nickname	Local founding date
Alpha Chi Omega	Theta Lambda	Alpha Chi, AXO	1985
Alpha Delta Pi	Zeta Nu	ADPi	1976
Alpha Omicron Pi	Theta Phi	Alpha O, AOII	2025
Alpha Phi	Iota Rho	A Phi	2012
Chi Omega	Psi Kappa	Chi O	1970
Delta Delta Delta	Beta Theta	Tri Delt	1970
Delta Gamma	Epsilon Kappa	DG	1981 (Recolonizing 2021)
Delta Zeta	Pi Epsilon	DZ	2005
Gamma Phi Beta	Epsilon Theta	Gamma Phi	1988
Kappa Delta	Epsilon Tau	KD	1980
Kappa Kappa Gamma	Epsilon Mu	Kappa	1970
Pi Beta Phi	SC Beta	Pi Phi	1976 (Recolonized 2016)
Sigma Kappa	Kappa Pi	Sig Kap	2009
Zeta Tau Alpha	Kappa Zeta	Zeta	1991

=== Interfraternity Council Fraternities ===
List of the 24 active organizations within the Interfraternity Council at Clemson University

Organization	Chapter	Nickname	Local founding date
Alpha Sigma Phi	Epsilon Upsilon	Alpha Sig	April 5, 2008
Alpha Tau Omega	Eta Pi	ATO	1970 (re-chartered in 2005)
Beta Theta Pi	Delta Nu	Beta	November 7, 1970
Beta Upsilon Chi	Alpha Eta	BYX or "Bux" (/bʌks/)	2012
Chi Phi	Delta Theta		2000 (closed 2005, re-colonized 2017)
Chi Psi	Alpha Chi Delta		January 8, 1972
Delta Chi	Clemson	D Chi	1990
Delta Tau Delta	Theta Mu	DTD	1994 (re-chartered in 2010)
Kappa Alpha Order	Delta Omicron	KA	February 21, 1970
Kappa Delta Rho	Upsilon Beta	KDR	October 15, 1994 (re-chartered 2023)
Kappa Sigma	Kappa Upsilon	Kappa Sig	1963 (local); March 6, 1970 (national)
Phi Gamma Delta	Chi Alpha	Fiji	1974 (closed 1981, re-chartered in 2017)
Phi Kappa Tau	Unk.	Phi Tau	Unk.
Phi Sigma Kappa	Upsilon Septaton	Phi Sig	December 5, 2005
Phi Kappa Psi	South Carolina Beta	Phi Psi	August 23, 2025
Psi Upsilon	Tau Epsilon	Psi U	October 21, 2017
Pi Kappa Alpha	Eta Alpha	Pike	1970
Sigma Alpha Epsilon	South Carolina Nu	SAE	1956 (local); 1970 (national) (closed 2015, re-colonized 2020)
Sigma Alpha Mu	Unk.	Sammy	Unk.
Sigma Nu	Theta Zeta	Snu (/snuː/)	1958 (local); 1970 (national)
Tau Kappa Epsilon	Sigma Psi	Teke (/tiːk/)	November 12, 1992
Theta Chi	Eta Alpha	N/A	1974 (closed 1995, re-colonized in 2017)
Triangle Fraternity	Unk.	Triangle	2013
Zeta Psi	Chi Tau	Zete	Fall 2025

=== National Pan-Hellenic Council ===
List of the seven currently active organizations within the National Pan-Hellenic Council at Clemson University

Organization	Chapter	Local Founding Date
Alpha Phi Alpha	Pi Alpha	February 23, 1983
Delta Sigma Theta	Omicron Phi	May 5, 1983
Kappa Alpha Psi	Kappa Lambda	October 16, 1980
Omega Psi Phi	Chi Zeta	April 6, 1974
Phi Beta Sigma	Omicron Lambda	Unk.
Sigma Gamma Rho	Mu Psi	Unk.
Zeta Phi Beta	Eta Nu	1986

=== Multicultural Greek Council ===
List of the four currently active organizations currently within the Multicultural Greek Council at Clemson University

Organization	Chapter	Local Founding Date
Delta Phi Lambda	Sigma	2016
Lambda Theta Phi	Delta Nu	2015
Sigma Iota Alpha	Beta Eta	2014
Sigma Lambda Gamma	Clemson University Associate Chapter	2020

== See also ==
- College fraternities and sororities
