= Alpha Zeta =

Alpha Zeta (ΑΖ) may refer to:

- Alpha Zeta (professional), fraternity in the agriculture and natural resources
- Alpha Zeta (Latin American), international Latin American fraternity
