= Psi Alpha Kappa =

American Latino fraternity (defunct)

- ΨΑΚ
- Founded: October 1, 1900; 125 years ago Lehigh University
- Type: Social
- Affiliation: Independent
- Status: Defunct
- Defunct date: c. 1905
- Emphasis: Latin American students
- Scope: Regional
- Chapters: 3
- Headquarters: United States

Psi Alpha Kappa (ΨΑΚ) was an American fraternity started by international Latin American students at Lehigh University in October 1900. It has the distinction of being the first inter-collegiate Latin American fraternity in the United States and the second to cater to Latin American students after Alpha Zeta.

== History ==
At the turn of the last century, international Latin American students began traveling to the United States for an education in larger numbers. English began replacing French as the second language to learn in Latin America so instead of traveling to Europe for education, wealthy Latin American families began to send their sons to the United States. As a result, Latin American students began to establish student organizations that would cater to their needs.

Lehigh University has the distinction of having the first Latino student organization in the United States, the Club Hispano Americano. The Club Hispano Americano was founded in 1887, thirteen years before Psi Alpha Kappa was established. Psi Alpha Kappa is the second fraternity to cater to students from Latin America, the first being Alpha Zeta fraternity founded at Cornell University on January 1, 1890.

Psi Alpha Kappa was active at Lehigh University as well as the Massachusetts Institute of Technology. The chapter at MIT was known as the Alpha chapter of Massachusetts. Efforts were made to expand to other college campuses and universities in Latin America. In a description of the period, the fraternity is described as making efforts to establish chapters at colleges and universities in Mexico.

Psi Alpha Kappa would eventually merge with other Anglo fraternities at Lehigh University and MIT. The Epitome yearbook of 1904 lists chapter names and years of installation. The yearbook record ends at Lehigh without mention in the 1905 book.

== Chapters ==
Chapter	Charter date and range	Institution	Location	Status	Ref.
Alpha of Pennsylvania	1900-1905	Lehigh University	Bethlehem, Pennsylvania	Inactive	
Alpha of Massachusetts	1901-1904	Massachusetts Institute of Technology	Cambridge, Massachusetts	Inactive	(Note: Appears to have been active at MIT between 1901-1904 according to the MIT Technique yearbook. It disbanded, allowing members to join other fraternities and dining clubs.)
Beta of Pennsylvania	1902-19xx ?	Lafayette College	Easton, Pennsylvania	Inactive	
