= Sigma Iota =

Latin American–based fraternity (1911–1931)

- ΣΙ
- Founded: November 27, 1904; 121 years ago Louisiana State University
- Type: Social
- Affiliation: Independent
- Status: Merged
- Merge date: December 26, 1931
- Successor: Phi Iota Alpha
- Emphasis: Latin American
- Scope: International
- Motto: Omne Rarum Carum
- Colors: Red and Green
- Flower: Red carnation
- Chapters: 12
- Headquarters: United States

Sigma Iota (ΣΙ) was the second Latin American–based Greek lettered inter-collegiate fraternity established in the United States. It began in 1903 as a social club for Latin American students known as La Estrella de Oro at Louisiana State University. The club rebranded itself as the fraternal organization Sociedad Hispano-Americana on November 27, 1904. The fraternity expanded to multiple campuses before selecting Sigma Iota as its Greek letter name in 1911. Sigma Iota merged with Phi Lambda Alpha fraternity to form Phi Iota Alpha on December 26, 1931.

== History ==
=== Predecessor ===
Sigma Iota originated from La Estrella de Oro, a secret society and social club for Spanish-American students that was formed on February 27, 1903, at Louisiana State University. Its eleven founders were one freshman, eight sub-freshmen, and two senior classmen of Cuban and Mexican descent, including Oscar Emilio Crabb Pacetti, Ernesto "Earnest" Juan Jose Geronimo Ferro, Robusteano Bernardo Ferro, Amito Freire, Francisco Freire, Alberto "Albert Gomez" Cecelio Larrieu Torres, John Clement Lombard, Ferdinand Vito Lopez, Edgardo Gregorio Rabel, Emilio Jose Rabel, and Charles Ramond Villa. Lopez and Crabb, the seniors, were the founding president and vice president, respectively.

The society rebranded itself briefly as La Colonia Hispano-Americana, on November 27, 1904, with its membership expanding to 24 active members, including individuals from Costa Rica, Spain, and Puerto Rico. The rebranded society's first president was Costa Rican Antonio Ramon Güell Gutiérrez, who would be heavily involved with the growth of the organization in the subsequent years.

La Colonia Hispano-Americano changed its name to Sociedad Hispano-Americana in December 1904 and gained recognition from the university as a fraternity. Its purpose was the encourage students of Spanish descent to seek a college education in the United States. Its motto was Omne Rarum Carum, meaning "Everything Rare is Dear". Membership in the society continued to be limited to students of Spanish descent who were from North or South America. By June 1906, the society had added chapters at Iowa State University and the University of Iowa. (Note: It appears that the two Iowa chapters were dormant before the establishment of Sigma Iota. These chapters are not included in a chapter roll in the 1914 LSU Gumbo Yearbook.) Starting in 1910, it began presenting the Sociedad Hispano-Americana Medal to a graduating student for proficiency in Spanish.

=== Sigma Iota ===
Sigma Iota monument at its birthplace on the former LSU campus

In 1911, the Sociedad Hispano-Americana Medal transformed from a secret society into Sigma Iota, becoming the second known Greek-lettered Latino fraternity. Sigma Iota's purpose was friendship and to help Spanish-American students who attended foreign universities. It also continued to present a medal for proficiency in Spanish by a non-Spanish speaking student.

Sigma Iota added chapters in the United States, Central America, and Europe, becoming the first international Greek-lettered Latin American-based fraternity when it chartered a chapter at the University of Geneva in January 1913. However, many of its chapters went inactive during World War I.

Meanwhile, Phi Lambda Alpha, a Latino fraternity established in 1919 at the University of California, Berkeley, had plans to expand throughout the United States. The two fraternities began to work toward merging into a new national fraternity. On December 26, 1931, Sigma Iota and Phi Lambda Alpha held a convention in Troy, New York where they agreed to form Phi Iota Alpha.

Sociedad Hispano-Americana coat of arms

In 1934, several undergraduate and graduate members of the former Sigma Iota, Phi Lambda Alpha, and current Phi Iota Alpha in Puerto Rico and the mainland United States, joined Puerto Rican fraternity Sigma Delta Alpha, and reorganized the latter as Phi Sigma Alpha of the Sigma Fraternity, with its mainland component established in 1939 being known as Sigma Iota Alpha of the Sigma Fraternity. A Greek-lettered designation that would eventually go on to be the namesake of the sorority Sigma Iota Alpha decades later.

== Symbols ==
Sigma Iota's symbolism and coat of arms were based on that of Sociedad Hispano-Americana (picture to the right). The fraternity's colors were red and green. Its flower was the red carnation. Its motto is Omne Rarum Carum.

== Governance ==
Sigma Iota was overseen by grand officers, including the supreme master, master, admiral, secretary, and treasurer.

== Chapters ==
Following is a list of Sigma Iota chapters, with inactive chapters and institutions in italics.

Chapter	Charter date and range	Institution	Location	Status	Ref.
Alpha Alpha	1911 – December 26, 1931	Louisiana State University	Baton Rouge, Louisiana	Merged (ΦΙΑ)	(Note: Became the Alpha chapter of Phi Iota Alpha)
Nu Alpha	April 1913–19xx ?	Alabama Polytechnic Institute	Auburn, Alabama	Inactive	(Note: Alabama Polytechnic Institute is now Auburn University.)
Nu Beta	1913–19xx ?	Syracuse University	Syracuse, New York	Inactive	
Nu Gamma	September 1913–19xx ?	Rensselaer Polytechnic Institute	Troy, New York	Inactive	
Epsilon Alpha	January 1913–19xx ?	University of Geneva	Geneva, Switzerland	Inactive	
Nu Delta	October 1914–c.1915	Atlanta Medical School	Atlanta, Georgia	Inactive	(Note: The college became the Medical Department of Emory University in 1915.)
Gamma Alpha	1914–19xx ?	University of Guatemala	Guatemala City, Guatemala	Inactive	
Epsilon Beta	March 1914–19xx ?	University of Liège	Liège, Wallonia, Belgium	Inactive	
Epsilon Gamma ?	1914–19xx ?	Catholic University of Louvain	Leuven, Flemish Region, Belgium	Inactive	
Nu Zeta	January 1915–19xx ?	University of Pennsylvania	Philadelphia, Pennsylvania	Inactive	
	1921–19xx ?		Havana, La Habana Province, Cuba	Inactive	
Nu Epsilon	1924 – December 26, 1931	Tulane University	New Orleans, Louisiana	Merged (ΦΙΑ)	(Note: Became the Zeta chapter of Phi Iota Alpha)
Upsilon Lambda	1927 – December 26, 1931	Loyola University New Orleans	New Orleans, Louisiana	Merged (ΦΙΑ)	(Note: Became the Eta chapter of Phi Iota Alpha)
Alpha Omega	1928–19xx ?	University of Florida	Gainesville, Florida	Inactive	(Note: Chapter formed from Alpha Omega, a local group established in 1926.)

== See also ==
- Cultural interest fraternities and sororities
- List of Latino fraternities and sororities
