= Club Hispano Americano =

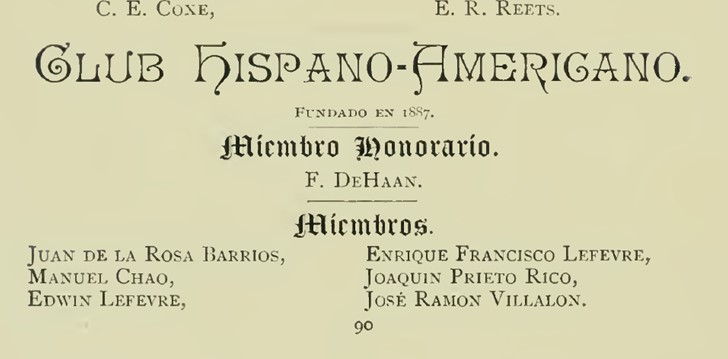
Club Hispano Americano - 1887 - First Latino student organization in the United States on a college campus.

The Club Hispano Americano (Hispanic American Club) is the first known Latin American student organization founded at the collegiate level in the United States. It was founded at Lehigh University in 1887. The club was created by international Latin American students who came to the United States to study before returning to their countries. Most of the members in the Club Hispano Americano were in fraternities. After its creation in 1887, other Latin American students started forming similar clubs throughout the northeast. An example of this is the Club Hispano Americano, founded at Rensselaer Polytechnic Institute (RPI) in 1890, became another organization to serve wealthy international Latin American students. The Club Hispano Americano at RPI became the first Latin American student organization at RPI. Some of its members were also in Anglo fraternities on campus. The Club Hispano Americano served as a foundation for other student groups that would follow its lead into the twentieth century.
