= Phi Lambda Alpha =

Latino American fraternity (1919–1931)

- ΦΛΑ
- Founded: November 26, 1920; 105 years ago University of California, Berkeley
- Type: Social
- Affiliation: Independent
- Status: Merged
- Merge date: December 26, 1931
- Successor: Phi Iota Alpha
- Emphasis: Latino
- Scope: North America
- Motto: Semper Parati Semper Juncti
- Publication: Boletin de Fi Lambda Alfa
- Chapters: 7
- Headquarters: United States

Phi Lambda Alpha (ΦΛΑ) was the first Latin American–based Greek lettered collegiate fraternity in the Western United States. It was established on November 26, 1920. It merged to form Phi Iota Alpha in 1931.

== History ==
Phi Lambda Alpha was a local fraternity established on November 26, 1920, at the University of California, Berkeley by twelve individuals. These founding members were Enrique Munguia Benitez, Luis Obispo Benoist, Horacio Peter Gabriel Madero, Raul Ramirez, Alfonso Samper, Abel Santos, Jesus Elias Sasaeta, Santiago Sompre, Gustavo Stahl, Juan Valenzuela, and Douglas Weatherston. It established communications with Pi Delta Phi, established in 1916 at Massachusetts Institute of Technology by the following eleven individuals: Nemesio Alvare y Gomez, Segundo Heliodoro Ayala, Rodolfo Lucio Fonseca, Eduardo Germain, Viviano Llano Valdés, Marcial Ernesto Martínez Vilches, Roberto José Ottonello, José Augusto Padilla, Luciano Atilio Preloran, Enrique Rivero Monasterio, and Antonio Helier Rodriguez y Cintra. Later, they included a non-Greek letter secret society, the Union Hispano Americana, established at Rennselaer Polytechnic Institute in 1898. The three organizations merged, adopting the name of Phi Lambda Alpha Fraternity on June 19, 1921, in New York City, New York. The new fraternity adopted Pi Delta Phi's distinctive emblem and constitution and the goals and motto of Union Hispano American.

After Phi Lambda Alpha was organized, other societies joined as new chapters. The Club Latino-Americano founded in 1919 at Colorado School of Mines became the Delta chapter in 1927. The Federación Latino-Americana founded in 1926 at Columbia University joined in 1928 as the Epsilon chapter. The Club Hispania founded in 1929 at Cornell University, joined in 1931 as the Zeta chapter. The Club Hispano-Americano founded in 1921 of Tri-State College joined in 1929 as the Eta chapter. In addition, the Alfa Tenoxtitlan Militant chapter was established in 1929 by alumni of Phi Lambda Alpha in Mexico.

On December 26, 1931, Phi Lambda Alpha merged with Sigma Iota fraternity to form Phi Iota Alpha. In 1934 graduate members of former Sigma Iota, Phi Lambda Alpha, and current Phi Iota Alpha in Puerto Rico, joined Puerto Rican fraternity Sigma Delta Alpha, and reorganized the latter as Phi Sigma Alpha.

== Symbols ==
Phi Lambda Alpha's motto was Semper Parati Semper Juncti. Its annual publication was Boletin de Fi Lambda Alfa.

== Chapters ==
Following are the chapters of Phi Lambda Alpha.

Chapter	Charter date and range	Institution	Location	Status	Ref.
Alpha	June 19, 1921 – December 26, 1931	Rennselaer Polytechnic Institute	Troy, New York	Merged (ΦΙΑ)	(Note: Chapter formed from Union Hispano Americana, established in 1898.) (Note: Became a chapter of Phi Iota Alpha with the national merger with Sigma Iota.)
Beta	June 19, 1921 – December 26, 1931	Massachusetts Institute of Technology	Cambridge, Massachusetts	Merged (ΦΙΑ)	(Note: Chapter formed from Pi Delta Phi, originally established in 1916, when the two fraternities merged.)
Gamma	June 19, 1921 – December 26, 1931	University of California, Berkeley	Berkeley, California	Merged (ΦΙΑ)	(Note: Chapter formed from Phi Lambda Alpha, established in 1919.)
Delta	1927–1931	Colorado School of Mines	Golden, Colorado	Inactive	(Note: Chapter formed from Club Latino-Americano, established in 1919.)
Epsilon	1928 – December 26, 1931	Columbia University	New York City, New York	Merged (ΦΙΑ)	(Note: Chapter formed from the Federación Latino-Americana, established in 1926.)
Zeta	1929 – December 26, 1931	Cornell University	Ithaca, New York	Merged (ΦΙΑ)	(Note: Chapter formed from the Club Hispania, established in 1929.)
Eta	1931 – December 26, 1931	Tri-State College	Angola, Indiana	Merged (ΦΙΑ)	(Note: Chapter formed from the Club Hispano-Americano, established in 1921.)
Alfa Tenoxtitlan Militant	1929–1931 ?		Mexico	Inactive	(Note: This was an alumni chapter.)

== See also ==
- Cultural interest fraternities and sororites
- List of Latino fraternities and sororities
