= Phi Iota Alpha =

American Latino interest collegiate fraternity

- ΦΙΑ
- Founded: December 26, 1931; 94 years ago Rensselaer Polytechnic Institute
- Type: Social
- Affiliation: NALFO; NIC
- Former affiliation: Union Latino Americana
- Status: Active
- Scope: National (US)
- Motto: Semper Parati, Semper Juncti
- Member badge
- Colors: Gold, Navy Blue, Red, and White
- Symbol: Lion
- Flag
- Flower: Red carnation
- Publication: The Phiota!
- Philanthropy: The 1931 Foundation; National Hispanic Institute
- Chapters: 82
- Colonies: 13
- Nicknames: Phiota, PhiA, Fiota
- Headquarters: 9322 3rd Avenue Suite 412; Brooklyn, New York 11209; United States
- Website: phiota.org

Phi Iota Alpha (ΦΙΑ), established on December 26, 1931, is the oldest active Latino fraternity in the mainland United States, and works to motivate people, develop leaders, and create innovative ways to unite the Latino community. The organization has roots that stem back to the late 19th century to the second intercollegiate Latin American fraternity, and one of the first Latin American student organization in the United States. The brotherhood is composed of undergraduate, graduate, and professional men committed towards the empowerment of the Latin American community by providing intensive social and cultural programs and activities geared towards the appreciation, promotion and preservation of Latin American culture.

Membership in Phi Iota Alpha is open to all men regardless of race, creed, color, or national origin. Phi Iota Alpha's membership includes prominent educators, politicians, businessmen, and four former presidents of Latin American countries. Phi Iota Alpha utilizes motifs from the Pan-American revolutionary period and uses images and colors depicting the time of Latin American revolutionaries and thinkers to represent the organization.

== History ==
=== Origins ===
The origins of Phi Iota Alpha are at the Rensselaer Polytechnic Institute (RPI), Troy, New York, on November 20, 1898. A group of a seven Latin American students organized the Union Hispano Americana (UHA) as a cultural and intellectual secret society based on the ideology of Pan-Americanism in attempt to promote further unity amongst the Latin student body that comprised nearly a dozen individuals in Fall 1899. These founders were Joaquin Maria Buenaventura, Nicolas De La Cava (of Delta Tau Delta), Jorge Adelberto Guirola (of Theta Xi), Alfredo LeBlanc, Luis Gonzaga Morphy (of Theta Xi), Pedro Eugenio Raygada, and Alfredo Gregorio Vergara (of Theta Xi). The founding members were all international students originally from Colombia, Cuba, Ecuador, El Salvador, Mexico, and Peru. Morphy served as the first President of the organization and would play an essential role in the organization throughout its initial years.

The immediate goal of the UHA was to provide a cultural environment for students of Latin America and Spain. The UHA was the first association of Latin American students ever founded in the United States. The UHA expanded to several colleges and universities in the United States; however, due to the secrecy imposed upon its members, not many records were kept.

The expansion and growth of the UHA were based on compromise and the ultimate need for similar organizations to unify and become more powerful. In the Northeastern Province of the United States, a group of Latin American students decided to organize a cultural and intellectual fraternity; as a result Pi Delta Phi (ΠΔΦ) fraternity was founded at Massachusetts Institute of Technology (MIT) in 1916 by Nemesio Alvare y Gomez, Segundo Heliodoro Ayala, Rodolfo Lucio Fonseca, Eduardo Germain, Viviano Llano Valdés, Marcial Ernesto Martínez Vilches, Roberto José Ottonello, José Augusto Padilla, Luciano Atilio Preloran, Enrique Rivero Monasterio, and Antonio Helier Rodriguez y Cintra. Shortly after its foundation, Pi Delta Phi initiated a search to expand to other colleges and universities where they became aware of the existence of other similar organizations.

=== Consolidation ===
Pi Delta Phi established communications with Phi Lambda Alpha (ΦΛΑ) fraternity, which had been recently founded in 1920 by Enrique Munguia Benitez, Luis Obispo Benoist, Horacio Peter Gabriel Madero, Raul Ramirez, Alfonso Samper, Abel Santos, Jesus Elias Sasaeta, Santiago Sompre, Gustavo Stahl, Juan Valenzuela, and Douglas Weatherston, in the Western Coast of the United States, at the University of California, Berkeley. After some communication, these two organizations realized the existence of a non-Greek letter secret society, the Union Hispano Americana (UHA). As a result of intensive correspondence and various interviews, the three organizations merged. In their merger agreement, the three organizations adopted the name of Phi Lambda Alpha fraternity, with the distinctive emblem & constitution of Pi Delta Phi, and the goals and motto of the UHA. This new union was formalized on June 11, 1921, in the City of New York.

After Phi Lambda Alpha was organized, other societies joined it: the "Club Latino-Americano" founded in 1919 at Colorado School of Mines; the "Federación Latino-Americana" founded in 1926 at Columbia University which joined in 1928; the "Club Hispania" founded in 1929 of Cornell University which joined in 1931; the "Club Hispano-Americano" founded in 1921 at (then) Tri-State College in Angola, Indiana which joined in 1929 and the Alfa Tenoxtitlan Militant chapter founded in 1929 made up of members of the Phi Lambda Alpha in Mexico.

Meanwhile, another similar organization was under development in the Southeastern region of the United States. In 1904, an organization with similar goals as Phi Lambda Alpha was founded under the name Sociedad Hispano-Americana at Louisiana State University. In 1911, the society transformed itself into Sigma Iota and became the second intercollegiate Latin American–based fraternity in the United States. By 1928, Sigma Iota had lost many of its chapters and therefore sought to stabilize its operations by consolidating its chapters in the United States with a more stationary and well-rooted organization.

Phi Lambda Alpha was seeking to expand throughout the United States and to promote the ideology of Pan-Americanism. Sigma Iota fraternity was in search of revitalizing some of its defunct chapters. Thus both organizations complemented each other and began to work towards the creation of the fraternity now known as Phi Iota Alpha.

=== Establishment ===
In December 1931 in Troy, New York, delegates from Phi Lambda Alpha and Sigma Iota assembled to form a unified fraternity to address the needs of Latin American Students in universities in the United States.

On December 26, 1931, the first day of a three-day convention, Phi Iota Alpha was born as both groups agreed to the merger. They resolved to unify under one name, one banner, one organization and one ideal. The next day of business was dedicated to preparing the details of revising the constitution and working on the creation of a shield to represent the newly formed national Latino brotherhood. On December 28, by the end of the three-day convention, the majority of the merger was completed. The last step in the merger was the ratification of some of the chapters of Sigma Iota that were not represented at the convention.

The fraternity was incorporated as a national organization on October 28, 1936, in the State of Louisiana, as Phi Iota Alpha Fraternity.

=== International expansion ===
After the unification of Sigma Iota and Phi Lambda Alpha, Phi Iota Alpha's goal was to expand on the national level and develop a plan for its existing and potential international possibilities. Phi Iota Alpha sponsored the 1932 convention in New York City to form the Union Latino Americana (ULA) with hopes of expanding its ideals internationally. The ULA was a Pan-American governing body of Latino fraternities that provided the framework for the implementation of Pan-American ideology. The ULA organized Latin America into 22 zones with each of the 21 Latin American countries constituting a zone, and Phi Iota Alpha representing the 22nd zone in the United States. By 1937, the ULA had several well-established and functional zones including the following:

- ΦΙΑ – Phi Iota Alpha in the United States
- ΦΚΑ – Phi Kappa Alpha in Cuba
- ΦΣΑ – Phi Sigma Alpha in Puerto Rico
- ΦΤΑ – Phi Tau Alpha in Mexico

In September 1938, the Phi Sigma Alpha zone decided to separate from the ULA and formed the Phi Sigma Alpha and Sigma Iota Alpha fraternities of Puerto Rico and Louisiana (both part of greater Sigma Fraternity union) which would also be composed of former members of Phi Iota Alpha. Twelve years later, Phi Tau Alpha has established itself as a local fraternity at the Juarez Institute in Mexico. As of 1955, Phi Iota Alpha had two international chapters designated Juarez (in Mexico) and Marti (in Cuba).

=== History: 1939–1983 ===
The outbreak of World War II greatly hindered the growth of Phi Iota Alpha in the United States. After the war, the fraternity drafted and implemented a new expansion strategy. As a result, the post-war period saw positive internal growth for the fraternity. In the early 1950s, Phi Iota Alpha eradicated any remnant of its political agenda. With only a few chapters, the fraternity continued to pursue its mission. The fraternity was again incorporated as a national organization on January 9, 1953, when the Secretary of State of New York accepted the incorporation of Phi Iota Alpha fraternity.

Phi Iota Alpha brother Bolivar DeGracia (bottom row, second from the right), member of the IFC Athletic Council at LSU in 1972

The 1960s were very challenging years for Phi Iota Alpha. The effects of the Vietnam War and the '60s counter-culture created an anti-institutional atmosphere amongst many college students. In addition, this drastically reduced the enrollment of Latin American students in American universities. This in turn hindered potential membership to the organization. As a result, by 1968, after many years of struggle, the only active undergraduate chapters were at LSU and RPI. The chapter at RPI became inactive in 1973 with the graduation of its Secretary General. The Secretary-General took with him the chapter's official fraternity documents. By 1979, the last active brother from the chapter at LSU graduated, marking the closing of the undergraduate chapter at LSU.

From 1979 to 1983, the fraternity witnessed a period of inactivity only at the undergraduate level. Some efforts were made to re-establish Phi Iota Alpha at the undergraduate level, but these efforts were not successful. Throughout this period, the brothers continued to maintain communication and continued to accomplish the mission of the organization. The history, ideals, and goals of the fraternity never diminished; they simply did not have active undergraduate members to cultivate them. Phi Iota Alpha continued to exist with the many Alumni members and Alumni chapters as they continued to develop their professional lives mostly in Latin American countries and in the United States.

Alpha chapter, 1984

=== History: 1984–2000 ===
In 1984, a group of male students at RPI, set upon learning about the fraternity that once existed on their campus, re-established Phi Iota Alpha. The 28 men involved in this effort were collectively dubbed "The Third Generation". They were Jose Amoedo, Alejandro Argimon, Abelardo Bal, Rick Bramley, Marc Cascio, Jose Cid, Daniel Cincunegui, Marc Claudio, Nelson Corchado, William Feliciano, George James, Udnauth "SHAM" Mathura, Joseph Matos, Williams Matos, Roberto Milan, Felipe Morales, Carlos Nieto, Victor Pagan, Carlos Pena, Miguel Perez, Ernesto Ramos, Roger Snook, William Suarez, Freddy Tamayo, Efrian Torres, Gilberto Torres, Andres Viera, and Daniel Villagomez.

The reactivated fraternity's Beta Chapter was established at Stony Brook University in 1987, becoming the first Latino Greek-letter organization recognized by the university. In 1990, however, for reasons that were not publicly disclosed, the fraternity expelled several members and suspended the formation of new member lines at the chapter from Fall 1990 through Fall 1996, while a select group of members remained in recognized status. Efforts to reactivate the chapter began in 1994 and continued over the next several years. The suspension was ultimately lifted in 1997, when the Beta Chapter was formally re-established through the absorption of the members of a local fraternity formally known as Balaam Mu Tau (BMT).

After the re-emergence of the fraternity, the last Secretary General instituted the members of the RPI chapter as the Alpha chapter of Phi Iota Alpha. In the 1980s the fraternity dedicated its efforts to rebuilding the organizational infrastructure and to expand to several universities in New York State. The fraternity was considered officially revived nationwide in 1987 at the collegiate level due to this effort. In 1990, after roughly five years of effort, members of the current Alpha, Beta, Gamma, and Delta chapters were able to assist in the creation of the Hermandad de Sigma Iota Alpha, Incorporada which used the Greek-letter designation of the defunct Sigma Iota Alpha formed by members who seceded from Phi Iota Alpha in 1939. By 2000, Phi Iota Alpha had chartered chapters across the United States; which include the re-establishment of a presence on campuses where Sigma Iota and Phi Lambda Alpha had been present like Syracuse University and Columbia University.

=== 75th anniversary ===
Phi Iota Alpha declared 2006 and 2007 to celebrate the Diamond Jubilee. The 75th Anniversary Celebration was launched with a pilgrimage to Rensselaer Polytechnic Institute on October 13, 2006, and culminated with the Semi sesquicentennial Anniversary Convention on the weekend of July 27 to July 29, 2007, in New York City.

== Fraternal ideology ==
=== Beliefs ===
Phi Iota Alpha emphasizes Latin American culture, intellectual development, cultural awareness, personal growth, achievement, and social responsibility. The fraternity seeks to promote greater understanding of the shared values, histories, and traditions of Latin America while encouraging engagement with social and economic issues affecting Latin American communities in the United States and abroad.

The organization also seeks to advance a broader Latin American perspective that extends beyond individual national identities. Drawing on traditions of Pan-Americanism, Phi Iota Alpha highlights cultural connections, cooperation, and solidarity among the nations and peoples of Latin America.

"Fuerza, Integridad, y Amistad."

— Phi Iota Alpha Fraternity Creed

=== Mission ===
- Promotion of personal, community, and Pan-American development through the ideals of Simón Bolívar and José Martí as well as other Pan-American intellectuals and their philosophies;
- Creation of a Latin American consciousness,
- Intensification of education with a Latin American character;
- Economic and social mobilization of Latin American communities globally;
- Intensification of contact between Pan-American Countries to form a unified network of professional and economic contacts to ultimately achieve the unification of Latin America;
- Conservation of the integrity of the Latin American character.
- Rejection of war and violence as a means to achieving unification.

=== Pillars ===
The organization has five pillars, well known historical figures from Latin America:

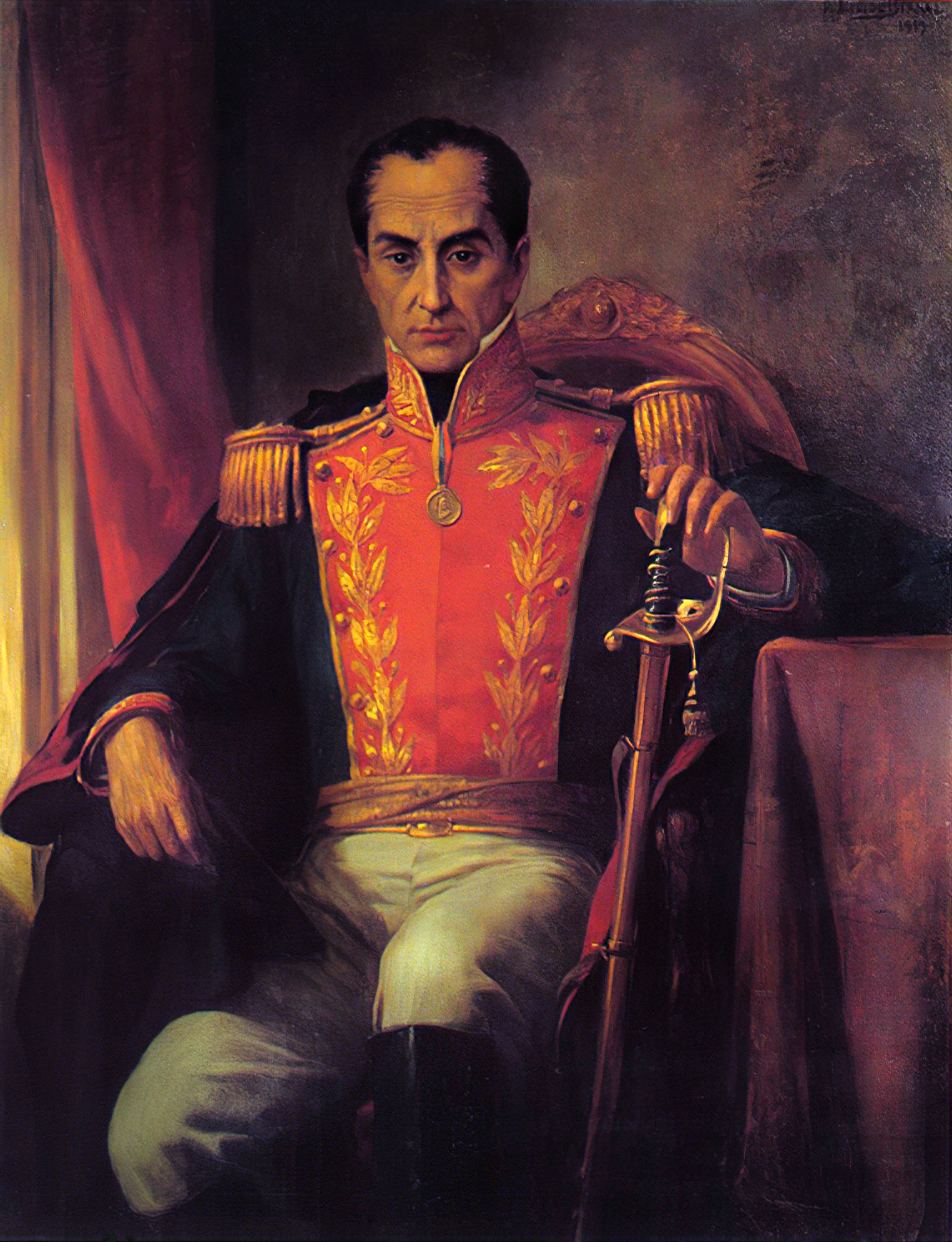
Don Simón Bolívar

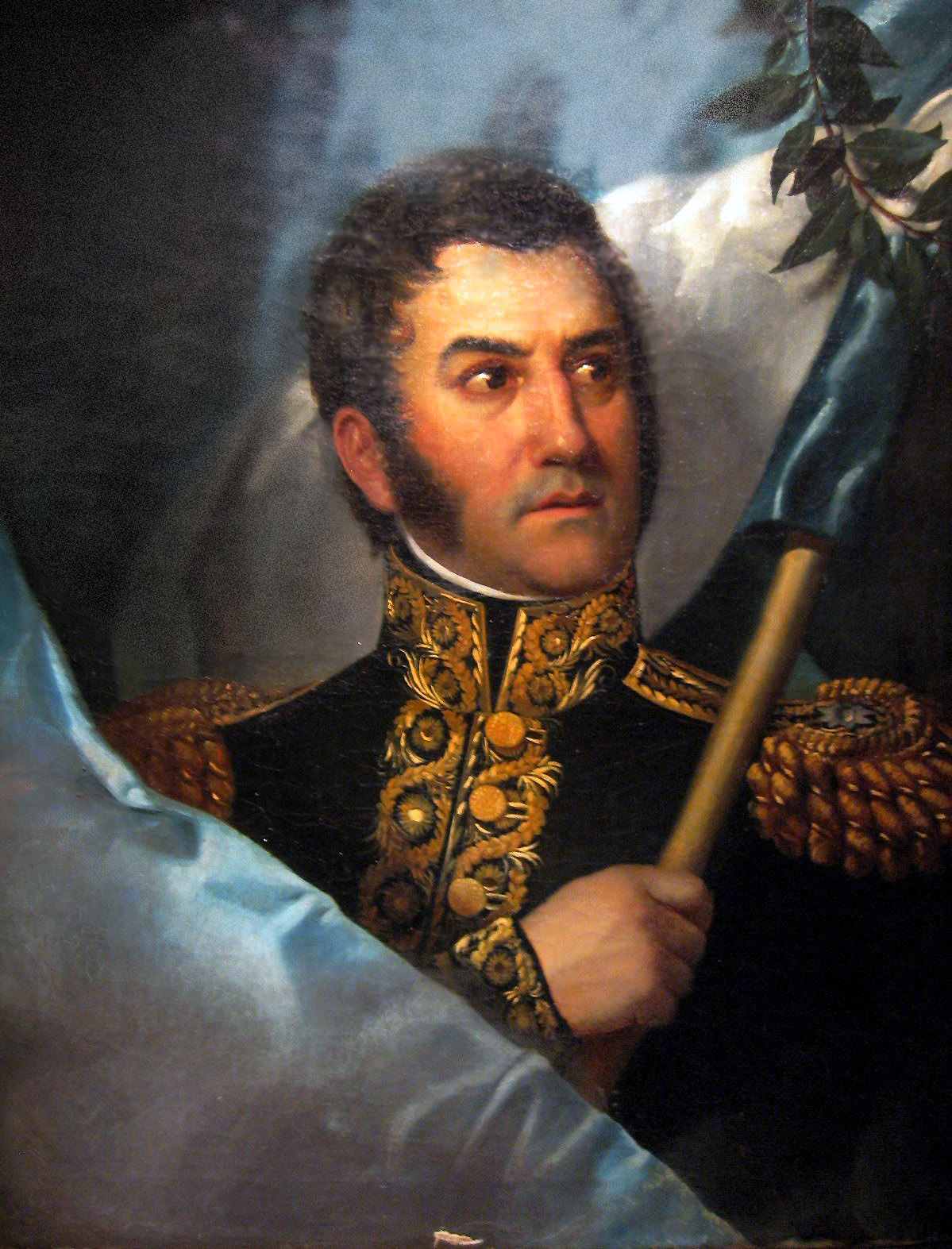
Don José de San Martín

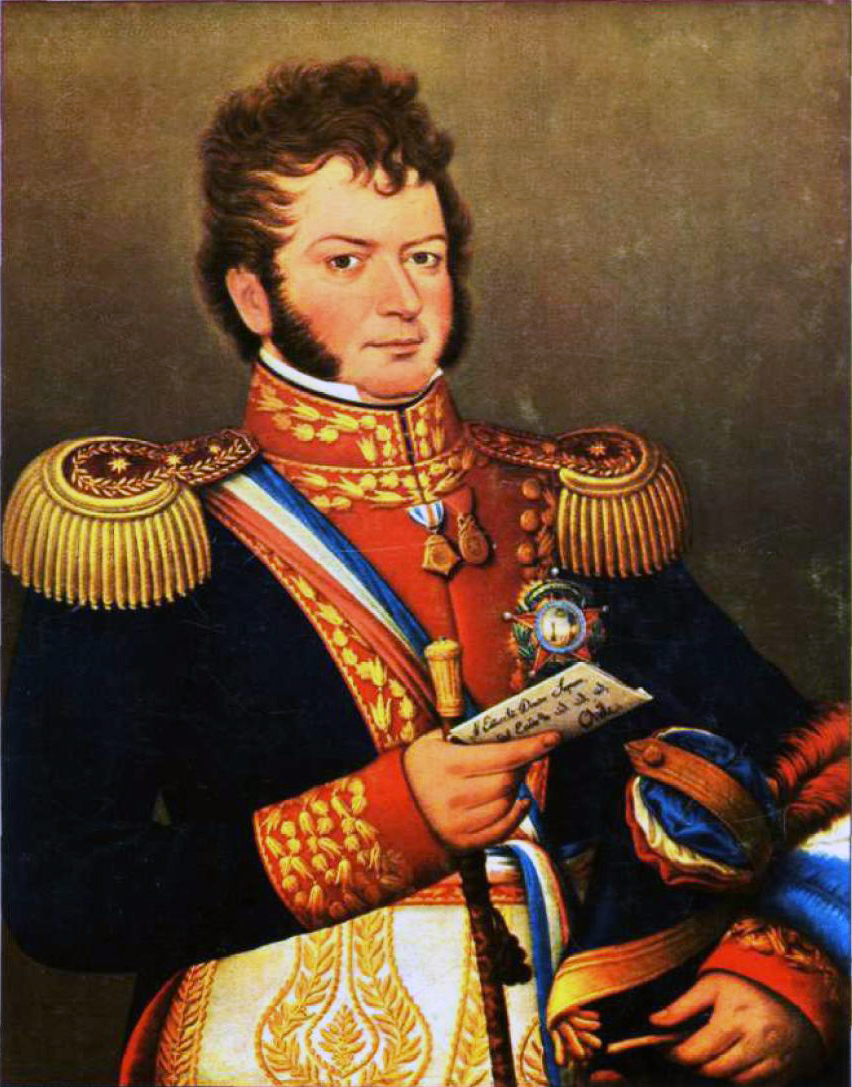
Don Bernardo O'Higgins

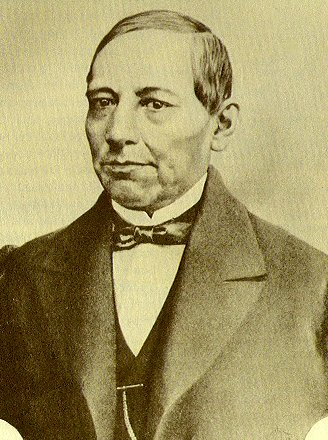
Don Benito Juárez

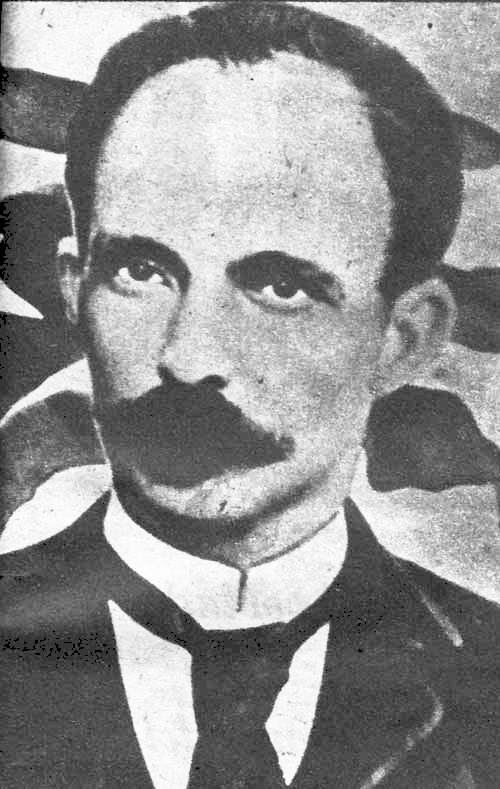
Don José Martí

=== Dates of celebration ===
The fraternity's dates of celebration include:

- April 14 (Pan American Day)
- September 15 – October 15 (National Hispanic Heritage Month)
- October 12 (Day of the Race)
- December 26 (Establishment Anniversary and Day of the Illuminated Latin Americans)

== Symbols ==
Phi Iota Alpha's motto is Semper Parati, Semper Juncti. Its colors are red white, navy blue, and gold. Its mascot is the lion. Its flower is the red carnation. Its publication is The Phiota! The fraternity's nickname is Phiota.

=== Pan-Americanism ===
Phi Iota Alpha chose to use Pan-American symbolism to be more representative of the goals and ideals of the organization. Phi Iota Alpha utilizes motifs from the Pan-American revolutionary period and uses images and colors depicting the time of Latin American revolutionaries and thinkers to represent the organization. This is in contrast to most other Latino fraternities that traditionally echo themes from the Pre-Columbian period of Latin American history. Phi Iota Alpha's constant reference to Pan-American ideals in hymns and poems are further examples of Phi Iota Alpha's mission to imbue with a Pan-American cultural perspective.

=== Badge ===
The badge is the most prominent symbol of membership. It is a gold pin in the shape of a Roman fasces topped with a double-edged ax and crowned in the superior of the fasces of six stars, each star with an argent pearl at its center. The fasces are held together by two ropes in gold that tie the fasces at the top and the bottom with the middle tied in the form of an x-shaped cross. In the middle of the fasces, above the ropes lies an argent riband engraved with the Greek letters ΦΙΑ. The badge dies at the bottom with a golden sphere that culminates the fasces.

=== Flag ===
The official flag consists of three bands in gold, azure, and gules of equal height. The Greek letters ΦΙΑ in gold are located on the azure field at the center outlined with argent. The chapter letter is carried on the Gules band sinister in argent. The flag is modeled after the flag of Simón Bolívar's Republic of Great Colombia, the short-lived republic that consisted of present-day Colombia, Venezuela, Ecuador, and Panama.

=== Coat of arms ===
The fraternity's insignia, coat of arms or crest, consists of a blazon composed of a gold shield, gules chevron lowered a third charged with six argent stars, three dexter, three sinister. At the fess point, under an oval azure field, the Latin American Map in gold, surrounded by a steel chain made of 21 links. The Greek letters ΦΙΑ in azure in dexter, fess point and sinister of the chief, occupying a third part of the canton. At the base, a Phrygian Cap in gules facing dexter. The principal bordure is double in azure and argent, respectively. The shield is crowned with a frontal steel helm with nine bars and adorned with argent lambrequins falling at dexter and sinister. The crest is formed by a Roman fasces in a vertical position and a double-edged ax. A pair of lions rampant with sanguine tongues supports the shield. The riband for the motto at the lions' feet, in argent, with azure letters states Semper Parati Semper Juncti.

== National programs ==
Phi Iota Alpha asserts that through community outreach initiatives, the fraternity supplies voice and vision to the struggle of Latino and Hispanic Americans in the United States and Latin America. The fraternity provides for charitable endeavors through its Foundations, providing academic scholarships and support for community development projects.

=== Affiliations ===
The fraternity maintains dual membership in the National Association of Latino Fraternal Organizations (NALFO) and the North American Interfraternity Conference (NIC).

NALFO is composed of 19 Latino Greek-letter sororities and fraternities, of which Phi Iota Alpha is the oldest member. The association promotes and fosters positive interfraternal relations, communication, and development of all Latino fraternal organizations through mutual respect, leadership, honesty, professionalism, and education.

The NIC serves to advocate the needs of its member fraternities through the enrichment of the fraternity experience; advancement and growth of the fraternity community; and enhancement of the educational mission of the host institutions.

Phi Iota Alpha is also a member of the NIC Latino Fraternal Caucus. One of the only four Latino fraternities that are part of the NIC. Before joining NALFO, Phi Iota Alpha was a member of the Concilio Nacional de Hermandades Latinas.

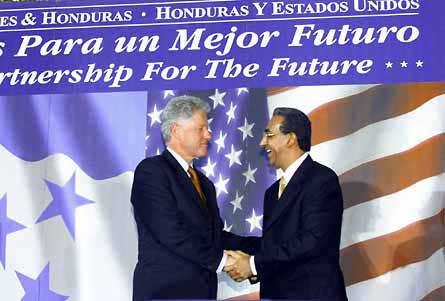
Carlos Roberto Flores with Bill Clinton

== Membership ==
Phi Iota Alpha's membership is predominantly Latino and Hispanic American in composition. Members come from the United States, the Caribbean, Latin America, Africa, Asia, and Europe. As Phi Iota Alpha expanded, the membership ranks grew to include many prominent and accomplished educators, politicians, businessmen, and four former presidents of Latin American countries.

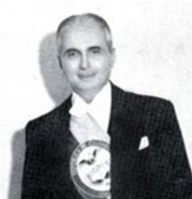
Mariano Ospina Pérez

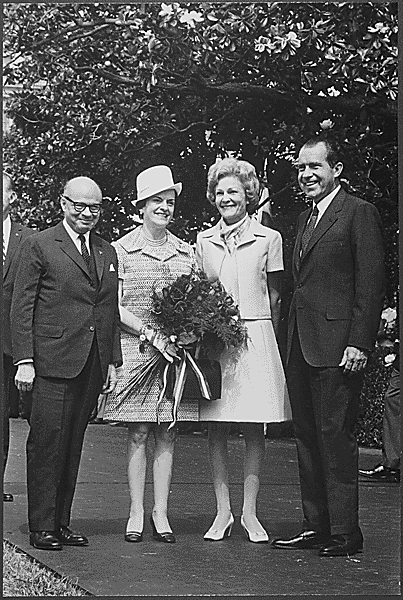
Carlos Lleras Restrepo with Richard Nixon

== Hazing and misconduct ==
In October 2018, the Delta Chapter of Phi Iota Alpha at the University at Albany was among several fraternities and sororities identified by the university amid a broader crackdown on hazing, alcohol-related misconduct, and unrecognized organization activity. In a letter issued by Vice President for Student Affairs Michael N. Christakis, the university announced that Phi Iota Alpha Fraternity was prohibited from taking new members during the Fall 2018 semester.

== Notable members ==
- Miguel Hernandez Agosto – former President of the Popular Democratic Party of Puerto Rico
- Emilio Bacardi – former mayor of Santiago, Cuba and son of Bacardi Founder Facundo Bacardi
- Eric Arturo Delvalle – former President of Panama
- Carlos Roberto Flores – former President of Honduras
- Rudolph Matas – the father of modern vascular surgery
- Enrique Oltuski – Deputy Minister of Communication for former President Manuel Urrutia Lleo of Cuba
- Mariano Ospina Pérez – former President of Colombia
- Carlos Lleras Restrepo – former President of Colombia
- Alfonso Robelo Callejas – Founder of the Democratic Movement Party of Nicaragua
- Manny De Los Santos – City of New York 72nd Assembly Male District Leader of Inwood/Marble Hill
- Andy Vargas – Massachusetts State Representative, 3rd Essex District

== See also ==
- Cultural interest fraternities and sororities
- List of Latino fraternities and sororities
