= Sigma Iota Alpha =

American Latina-oriented collegiate sorority

- ΣΙΑ
- Founded: September 29, 1990; 35 years ago: SUNY Albany; Stony Brook University; SUNY New Paltz; Rensselaer Polytechnic Institute
- Type: Social
- Affiliation: NALFO
- Status: Active
- Emphasis: Cultural - Latina culture
- Scope: National
- Motto: Semper Unum et Inseparabilis "Always One and Inseparable"
- Colors: Red, Gold, and Royal Blue; Background colors: White and Black
- Flower: Red Rose
- Jewel: White Pearl
- Mascot: Unicorn and Pegasus
- Chapters: 62 collegiate, 13 graduate
- Colonies: 18
- Nickname: SIA, Lovely Latin Ladies
- Headquarters: 1732 1st Avenue #20267; New York, New York 10128; United States
- Website: hermandad-sia.org

Sigma Iota Alpha, more formally Hermandad de Sigma Iota Alpha, Incorporada (ΣΙΑ), and known as SIA, is a Latina-oriented Greek letter intercollegiate sorority. It was founded in 1990 at SUNY Albany, Stony Brook University, SUNY New Paltz, and Rensselaer Polytechnic Institute. The sorority increases awareness of Latina culture and participates in local, national, and international community service, educational, cultural, and social events. It is a member of the National Association of Latino Fraternal Organizations, Inc. (NALFO).

== History ==
Sigma Iota Alpha was founded on September 29, 1990, by thirteen women from four colleges in New York: University at Albany, SUNY; SUNY New Paltz; Stony Brook University; and Rensselaer Polytechnic Institute. The founders include Dora Maria Abreu, Elizabeth Coats, Tina Colberg, Eulogia Diaz, Angelica Hernandez, Teresa Herrero, Norma Porras, Miriam Ramirez, Saida Rodriguez, Grecia Sanchez, Maria Trujillo, Clara Vasquez and Dulce Williams.

The mission of Hermandad de Sigma Iota Alpha, Inc. is "to formalize, cultivate, and foster bonds amongst each other as sisters and abide by respect, trust, communication, professionalism, and accountability." Alpha Iota Sigma's goals are to increase awareness of the diverse Latino cultures, to promote leadership amongst the sisters, and to serve as "models of excellence in education and achievement amongst women."

The sorority expanded and chartered chapters outside of New York state.

Sigma Iota Alpha logo

The foundations for the sorority began to be set across its four founding campuses in 1985 through the aid of Alpha, Beta, Gamma, and Delta chapters of the modern day iteration of Phi Iota Alpha. Its Greek-lettered designation can be derived from the defunct fraternity Sigma Iota Alpha that was founded in April 1939 by former members of the aforementioned Phi Iota Alpha who chose to secede and become the American component of Fraternidad Sigma (Sigma Fraternity).

== Symbols ==
The sorority's colors are gold, red and royal blue. Black and white are used as background colors. Its mascots include the unicorn and the Pegasus. Its flower is the red rose and its gem is the white pearl. Its motto is Semper Unum et Inseparabilis or "Always One and Inseparable".

== Activities ==
SIA has supported several philanthropic initiatives since its establishment, promoting service on three levels: international, national, and local. Notable international organizations include Children International. National philanthropies include March of Dimes, the National MS Society, One Heartland, and Special Olympics. Its local efforts are called Out Sisters in Action and vary between chapters.

The Solidaridad, Inspiracion y Amistad Community Foundation, Inc. was created in 2004 and collaborates with the sorority to provide scholarships to Latinas and support for building communities.

The R.O.S.E. Mentorship Program is a national educational initiative operated by the graduate chapters. R.O.S.E. serves Latina women ages 14 to 18. It creates community leaders by encouraging service, scholarship and personal development.

== Membership ==
Throughout the last 30+ years, Hermandad de Sigma Iota Alpha, Inc. has grown to include 62 undergraduate chapters, thirteen regional alumnae chapters, and seventeen colonies in the states of New York, Massachusetts, Connecticut, New Jersey, Pennsylvania, Maryland, Virginia, Georgia, Florida, Illinois, Michigan, Texas, California, Kansas, Arkansas, and South Carolina. SIA was the first Latina sorority to be established in Massachusetts and Arkansas.

Chapters and colonies are composed of undergraduate, graduate, and professional women.

== Chapters ==
Sgma Iota Alpha has undergraduate and alumni chapters.

== Notable members ==
- Gloria Garayua, film and television actress

== See also ==
- List of social sororities and women's fraternities
