= List of Theta Xi members =

Theta Xi is a North American social college fraternity. It was founded at Rensselaer Polytechnic Institute in 1864 as an engineering fraternity, but later changed to a social fraternity. The following list of Theta Xi members includes initiated and honorary notable members of Theta Xi. Members are listed by name and chapter.

== Academia ==
- Vladimir Karapetoff, professor of electrical engineering at Cornell University
- Palmer C. Ricketts (Alpha), Ninth president of Rensselaer Polytechnic Institute
- Charles F. Scott, electrical engineer and professor at Yale University
- Homer L. Shantz, botanist and president of the University of Arizona
- William F. Sharpe (Alpha Zeta), Awarded the 1990 Nobel Prize for Economics and emeritus professor at Stanford University's Graduate School of Business
- Frederick E. Turneaure, professor and dean of engineering at the University of Wisconsin–Madison

== Art and architecture ==
- Jim Davis (Kappa Kappa), creator of Garfield comic strip
- Emil Praeger (Alpha), architect and civil engineer

== Business and nonprofits ==
- Marshall Goldsmith (Kappa), executive leadership coach and author
- Charles Hayden (Delta), senior partner of Hayden, Stone & Co., industrialist, and philanthropist
- David Hirsch (Alpha Beta), founder 21st Century Dads Foundation
- Travis Kalanick (Alpha Zeta ), founder and CEO of Uber
- Ray Klinginsmith (Beta Iota), world president of Rotary International
- Jack Lindquist (Alpha Nu), former president of Disneyland (1990–1994)
- Benjamin H. Oehlert Jr., president of Minute Maid, vice-president of The Coca-Cola Company, and U.S. Ambassador to Pakistan
- Jimmy Rane, businessman and CEO of Great Southern Wood Preserving

== Entertainment ==
- Philip Bartholomae, playwright, lyricist, screenwriter, and theatre director
- Richard Boone (Tau, former), Emmy-winning actor
- Bruce Davison (Lambda), Golden Globe Award winning actor
- Ferde Grofé (Alpha Nu), composer
- Patrick Simmons (Beta Beta), founding member of The Doobie Brothers

== Government ==
- Eric O'Neill (Beta Zeta), FBI operative, subject of the movie Breach

== Law ==
- Malcolm Lucas, Supreme Court of California justice

== Literature and journalism ==
- Richard Reeves (Gamma), author and syndicated columnist

== Military ==
- Ronald L. Burgess Jr. (Beta Zeta), 17th Director of the Defense Intelligence Agency and United States Army lieutenant general
- William L. Haskin, U.S. Army brigadier general

== Politics ==
- Alva B. Adams (Beta), U.S. Senator from Colorado
- Truman H. Aldrich, U.S. House of Representatives from Alabama
- Butler Ames, U.S. House of Representatives from Massachusetts
- Frank Church (Tau), U.S. Senator from Idaho 1957-1981
- Mayson Foster (Beta Pi), Mayor of Hammond, Louisiana
- Donald H. Magnuson (Upsilon), U.S. House of Representatives from Washington
- John Morroni, Florida House of Representatives
- W. Aubrey Thomas, U.S. House of Representatives from Ohio
- William H. Wiley (Alpha), U.S. House of Representatives from New Jersey

== Science and technology ==
- Allen B. DuMont (Alpha), scientist and inventor
- James S. Voss (Beta Zeta), astronaut

== Sports ==
- Jerry Tagge (Alpha Epsilon), professional football player with the Green Bay Packers

== See also ==
- List of Theta Xi chapters
