= List of Chi Epsilon chapters =

Chi Epsilon is a national collegiate civil engineering honor society in the United States. Following are its chapters. Chapters are designated by the school at which they are located and a number indicating charter order.

Number	Charter date	Chapter name and institution	Location	Status	Ref.
1	May 20, 1922	University of Illinois Urbana-Champaign	Champaign and Urbana, Illinois	Active	
2	March 29, 1923	Illinois Institute of Technology	Chicago, Illinois	Active	(Note: This formed at the Armour Institute of Technology and, therefore, originally called the Armour chapter. The Armour Institute became the Armour College of Engineering at the Illinois Institute of Technology.)
3	1923	University of Minnesota	Minneapolis, Minnesota	Active	
4	1924	University of Southern California	Los Angeles, California	Active	
5	1925	Cornell University	Ithaca, New York	Active	
6	1925	University of Wisconsin–Madison	Madison, Wisconsin	Active	
7	1925	University of California, Berkeley	Berkeley, California	Active	
8	1927	Pennsylvania State University	University Park, Pennsylvania	Active	
9	1928	Massachusetts Institute of Technology	Cambridge, Massachusetts	Active	
10	1929	University of Colorado Boulder	Boulder, Colorado	Active	
11	1929	Purdue University	West Lafayette, Indiana	Active	
12	1934	University of Missouri	Columbia, Missouri	Active	
13	1939	University of Texas at Austin	Austin, Texas	Active	
14	1938	Auburn University	Auburn, Alabama	Active	
15	1937	University of Mississippi	Oxford, Mississippi	Active	
16	1940	University of Iowa	Iowa City, Iowa	Active	
17	1940	Rensselaer Polytechnic Institute	Troy, New York	Active	
18	1941	Virginia Tech	Blacksburg, Virginia	Active	
19	1941	Oklahoma State University–Stillwater	Stillwater, Oklahoma	Active	
20	1943	Georgia Tech	Atlanta, Georgia	Active	
21	1948	Michigan Technological University	Houghton, Michigan	Active	
22	1948	University of Alabama	Tuscaloosa, Alabama	Active	
23	1948	North Carolina State University	Raleigh, North Carolina	Active	
24	1948	University of Utah	Salt Lake City, Utah	Active	
25	1949	University of Michigan	Ann Arbor, Michigan	Active	
26	1949	West Virginia University	Morgantown, West Virginia	Active	
27	1949	University of Connecticut	Storrs, Connecticut	Active	
28	1949	Cooper Union	New York City, New York	Active	
29	1949	Ohio State University	Columbus, Ohio	Active	
30	1949	City College of New York	New York City, New York	Active	
31	1949	New York University Tandon School of Engineering	Brooklyn, New York	Active	
32	1949	Manhattan College	Bronx, New York City, New York	Active	
33	1949	University of Tennessee	Knoxville, Tennessee	Active	
34	1950	University of Cincinnati	Cincinnati, Ohio	Active	
35	1950	Missouri University of Science and Technology	Rolla, Missouri	Active	
36	1950	Marquette University	Milwaukee, Wisconsin	Active	
37	1950	Colorado State University	Fort Collins, Colorado	Active	
38	1950	University of Detroit Mercy	Detroit, Michigan	Active	
39	1951	University of New Mexico	Albuquerque, New Mexico	Active	
40	1951	Clarkson University	Potsdam, New York	Active	
41	1951	Norwich University	Northfield, Vermont	Active	
42	1951	Michigan State University	East Lansing, Michigan	Active	
43	1952	Lehigh University	Bethlehem, Pennsylvania	Active	
44	1953	Drexel University	Philadelphia, Pennsylvania	Active	
45	1953	New York University	New York City, New York	Active	
46	1955	Southern Methodist University	Dallas, Texas	Active	
47	1956	Yale University	New Haven, Connecticut	Active	
48	1957	Wayne State University	Detroit, Michigan	Active	
49	1957	University of Hawaiʻi	Honolulu, Hawaii	Active	
50	1958	New Jersey Institute of Technology	Newark, New Jersey	Active	
51	1960	Kansas State University	Manhattan, Kansas	Active	
52	1961	University of Maryland, College Park	College Park, Maryland	Active	
53	1961	University of Nebraska–Lincoln	Lincoln, Nebraska	Active	
54	1961	Worcester Polytechnic Institute	Worcester, Massachusetts	Active	
55	1961	South Dakota State University	Brookings, South Dakota	Active	
56	1962	Texas A&M University	College Station, Texas	Active	
57	1962	University of Arkansas	Fayetteville, Arkansas	Active	
58	1962	University of Kentucky	Lexington, Kentucky	Active	
59	1964	Duke University	Durham, North Carolina	Active	
60	1965	Northeastern University	Boston, Massachusetts	Active	
61	1965	Iowa State University	Ames, Iowa	Active	
62	1966	University of Notre Dame	Notre Dame, Indiana	Active	
63	1967	Vanderbilt University	Nashville, Tennessee	Active	
64	1967	San Diego State University	San Diego, California	Active	
65	1967	University of Kansas	Lawrence, Kansas	Active	
66	1968	New Mexico State University	Las Cruces, New Mexico	Active	
67	1968	Louisiana State University	Baton Rouge, Louisiana	Active	
68	1968	Lamar University	Beaumont, Texas	Active	
69	1969	Bradley University	Peoria, Illinois	Active	
70	1969	State University of New York at Buffalo	Buffalo, New York	Active	
71	1969	University of Texas at Arlington	Arlington, Texas	Active	
72	1970	University of Vermont	Burlington, Vermont	Active	
73	1970	University of Pittsburgh	Pittsburgh, Pennsylvania	Active	
74	1970	Rutgers University–New Brunswick	New Brunswick, New Jersey	Active	
75	1970	California State University, Los Angeles	Los Angeles, California	Active	
76	1971	Montana State University	Bozeman, Montana	Active	
77	1971	University of Wisconsin–Platteville	Platteville, Wisconsin	Active	
78	1971	Mississippi State University	Starkville, Mississippi	Active	
79	1971	San Jose State University	San Jose, California	Active	
80	1972	University of Houston	Houston, Texas	Active	
81	1973	California State University, Long Beach	Long Beach, California	Active	
82	1973	Trine University	Angola, Indiana	Active	
83	1974	Clemson University	Clemson, South Carolina	Active	
84	1975	Tennessee Tech	Cookeville, Tennessee	Active	
85	1975	Texas Tech University	Lubbock, Texas	Active	
86	1976	University of Texas at El Paso	El Paso, Texas	Active	
87	1976	Louisiana Tech University	Ruston, Louisiana	Active	
88	1977	University of Virginia	Charlottesville, Virginia	Active	
89	1978	Syracuse University	Syracuse, New York	Active	
90	1978	University of Louisville	Louisville, Kentucky	Active	
91	1979	Old Dominion University	Norfolk, Virginia	Active	
92	1980	University of South Carolina	Columbia, South Carolina	Active	
93	1980	University of Maine	Orono, Maine	Active	
94	1982	Villanova University	Villanova, Pennsylvania	Active	
95	1982	California State Polytechnic University, Pomona	Pomona, California	Active	
96	1982	University of Colorado Denver	Denver, Colorado	Active	
97	1982	Columbia University	New York City, New York	Active	
98	1982	Carnegie Mellon University	Pittsburgh, Pennsylvania	Active	
99	1983	University of Oklahoma	Norman, Oklahoma	Active	
100	1983	University of Massachusetts Lowell	Lowell, Massachusetts	Active	
101	1983	University of Washington	Seattle, Washington	Active	
102	1984	University of Miami	Coral Gables, Florida	Active	
103	1984	University of South Florida	Tampa, Florida	Active	
104	1985	University of Louisiana at Lafayette	Lafayette, Louisiana	Active	
105	1985	University of Delaware	Newark, Delaware	Active	
106	1985	Arizona State University	Tempe, Arizona	Active	
107	1986	California Polytechnic State University, San Luis Obispo	San Luis Obispo, California	Active	
108	1988	University of California, Irvine	Irvine, California	Active	
109	1988	University of Nebraska Omaha	Omaha, Nebraska	Active	
110	1988	University of Massachusetts Amherst	Amherst, Massachusetts	Active	
111	1988	University of Rhode Island	Kingston, Rhode Island	Active	
112	1991	Florida Institute of Technology	Melbourne, Florida	Active	
113	1991	University of Central Florida	Orlando, Florida	Active	
114	1992	University of Toledo	Toledo, Ohio	Active	
115	1994	University of Florida	Gainesville, Florida	Active	
116	1994	University of California, Los Angeles	Los Angeles, California	Active	
117	1994	Lawrence Technological University	Southfield, Michigan	Active	
118	1995	Rice University	Houston, Texas	Active	
119	1996	University of North Carolina at Charlotte	Charlotte, North Carolina	Active	
120	1996	University of Alaska Fairbanks	College, Alaska	Active	
121	1997	Southern Illinois University Edwardsville	Edwardsville, Illinois	Active	
122	1997	Bucknell University	Lewisburg, Pennsylvania	Active	
123	1998	Florida International University	Miami, Florida	Active	
124	2000	University of Dayton	Dayton, Ohio	Active	
125	2000	Stevens Institute of Technology	Hoboken, New Jersey	Active	
126	2001	Washington University in St. Louis	St. Louis, Missouri	Active	
127	2003	University of Alabama at Birmingham	Birmingham, Alabama	Active	
128	2005	University of Evansville	Evansville, Indiana	Active	
129	2005	Ohio University	Athens, Ohio	Active	
130	2007	University of California, Davis	Davis, California	Active	
131	2008	Portland State University	Portland, Oregon	Active	
132	2008	Oregon State University	Corvallis, Oregon	Active	
133	2008	California State University, Fresno	Fresno, California	Active	
134	2009	University of Missouri–Kansas City	Kansas City, Missouri	Active	
135	2009	Texas A&M University–Kingsville	Kingsville, Texas	Active	
136	2010	George Mason University	Fairfax, Virginia	Active	
137	2013	California State University, Fullerton	Fullerton, California	Active	
138	April 24, 2016	Western Michigan University	Kalamazoo, Michigan	Active	
139	2016	South Dakota School of Mines and Technology	Rapid City, South Dakota	Active	
140	201x ?	University of South Alabama	Mobile, Alabama	Active	
141	2017	Morgan State University	Baltimore, Maryland	Active	
142	November 2018	Boise State University	Boise, Idaho	Active	
143	December 8, 2018	The College of New Jersey	Ewing Township, New Jersey	Active	
144	September 19, 2020	California State University, Chico	Chico, California	Active	
