= Chi Epsilon =

National civil engineering honor society

- ΧΕ
- Founded: May 20, 1922; 104 years ago University of Illinois at Urbana–Champaign
- Type: Honor
- Affiliation: Independent
- Former affiliation: ACHS
- Status: Active
- Emphasis: Civil engineering
- Scope: National
- Motto: "Conception, Design, Construction"
- Colors: Purple and White
- Symbol: Theodolite
- Publication: The Transit
- Chapters: 147 chapters
- Members: 125,000+ lifetime
- Headquarters: Chi Epsilon National Office; Cal Poly State University; College of Engineering, 1 Grand Avenue; San Luis Obispo, California 93407; United States
- Website: www.chi-epsilon.org

Chi Epsilon (ΧΕ) is an American collegiate civil engineering honor society. It honors engineering students who have exemplified the "principles of scholarship, character, practicality, and sociability...in the civil engineering profession." As of 2023, there are 141 chapters, of which 137 are active, where over 125,000 members have been inducted.

== History ==
In early 1922, two local civil engineering student groups–Chi Epsilon and Chi Delta Chi–formed independently at the University of Illinois at Urbana–Champaign and petitioned for university recognition. Once the two groups learned of each other, they merged under the Chi Epsilon name. The university approved Chi Epsilon on May 20, 1922, recognized by the society as it founding date, The group had 25 founding members.

Chi Epsilon is "dedicated to the purpose of maintaining and promoting the status of civil engineering as an ideal profession." Its objective and purpose are to uphold competence, sound engineering, good moral judgment, and a commitment to society to improve the civil engineering profession.

The society received a certificate of incorporation from the State of Illinois on February 23, 1923.

Chi Epsilon sent letters to other engineering programs, inviting students to found a chapter. A second chapter was chartered at the Armour Institute of Technology on March 29, 1923.

The society is overseen by student officers at each chapter who act through a National Council. Its headquarters is located at the California Polytechnic State University.

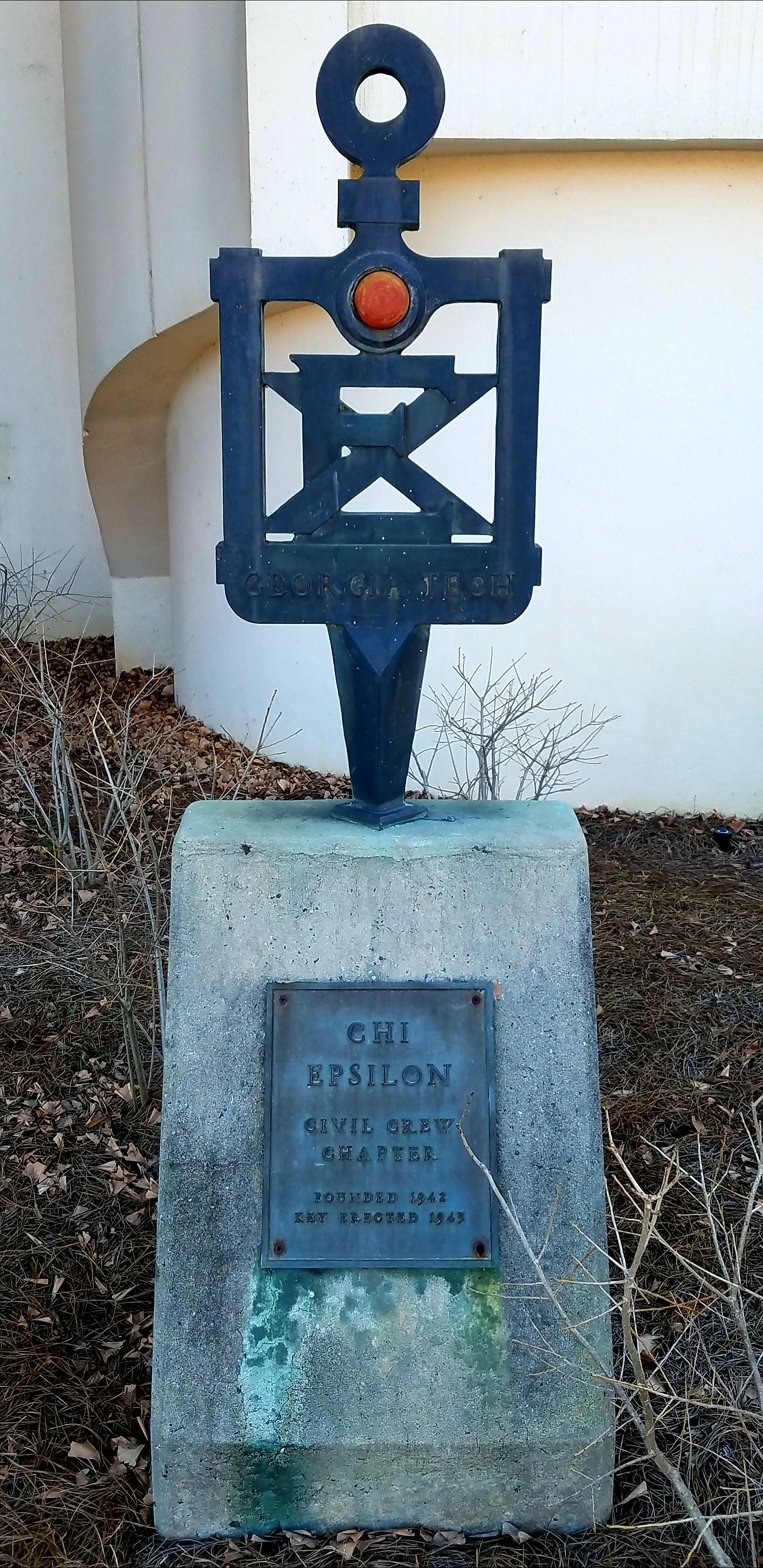
Chi Epsilon marker at Georgia Tech

== Symbols ==
The society's motto is "Conception, Design, Construction", suggested by the Greek letters Chi Delta Chi, the proposed name for one of Chi Epsilon's predecessor groups.

The colors of Chi Epsilon are purple and white. Its badge is a key made in the likeness of the front of a Theodolite or engineer's transit, the instrument of a surveyor. Its publication is The Transit, published semi-annually in the spring and fall of each year.

== Membership ==
Male and female undergraduates, graduates, and faculty in civil engineering are all eligible to become members if they meet basic requirements. Undergraduates must be in the top third of their class and have completed at least half of the civil engineering curriculum leading to a bachelor's degree. Members are selected based on scholarship, character, practicality, and sociability, the four primary requirements of a successful engineer.

All candidates must participate in a formal initiation ceremony. After becoming a regular member, anyone who has attained eminence through accomplishments in the profession may become a Chapter Honor Member. The next level of elevation is National Honor Member.

== Notable members ==
=== Collegiate and chapter honor members ===
| Name | Chapter of initiation | Notability | References |
|---|---|---|---|
| Ira Osborn Baker | University of Illinois Urbana-Champaign | Professor of engineering at the University of Illinois | |
| Thomas B. Berns | University of Illinois Urbana-Champaign | Professor of surveying at the University of Illinois and Illinois House of Representatives | |
| Joseph Colaco | University of Illinois Urbana-Champaign | Structural engineer noted for contributions to the supertall skyscrapers | |
| Hardy Cross | University of Illinois Urbana-Champaign | Developer of the moment distribution method for structural analysis of statically indeterminate structures. | |
| David E. Daniel | University of Illinois Urbana-Champaign | President of the University of Texas at Dallas and deputy chancellor of the University of Texas System | |
| Robert H. Dodds Jr. | University of Illinois Urbana-Champaign | Professor of civil and environmental engineering at the University of Illinois Urbana-Champaign | |
| Louis R. Douglass | University of Colorado Boulder | Civil engineer with the United States Bureau of Reclamation and was in charge of Hoover Dam | |
| Daniel C. Drucker | University of Illinois Urbana-Champaign | Dean of Engineering at the University of Illinois | |
| James van Hoften | University of California, Berkeley | Astronaut for NASA | |
| Fazlur Rahman Khan | University of Illinois Urbana-Champaign | Father of tubular designs for high-rises | |
| Franklin Matthias | University of Wisconsin–Madison | Civil engineer who directed the construction of the Hanford nuclear site | |
| Ralph Modjeski | University of Illinois Urbana-Champaign | Civil engineer and pioneer the use of suspension bridges | |
| Nathan M. Newmark | University of Illinois Urbana-Champaign | one of the founding fathers of earthquake engineering and recipient of the National Medal of Science | |
| Kent Rominger | Colorado State University | Astronaut and NASA Chief of the Astronaut Office at Johnson Space Center, | |
| Paul J. Tikalsky | University of Wisconsin–Madison | Dean & Donald and Cathey Humphreys Chair of Engineering at Oklahoma State University. | |

=== National Honor Members ===
National Honor Members start as collegiate members or chapter honor members but are elevated based on professional achievement. The chapters listed are the original chapter of initiation, followed by the NHM elevation chapter if different.

| Name | Chapter of initiation | Notability | References |
|---|---|---|---|
| Stephen Bechtel Jr. | Purdue University | Businessman and owner of the Bechtel Corporation | |
| Charles B. Breed | MIT | Head of the Department of Civil and Sanitary Engineering at the Massachusetts Institute of Technology | |
| George Dewey Clyde | University of Utah | Governor of Utah and dean of the Utah State University College of Engineering and Technology | |
| Hardy Cross | University of Illinois Urbana-Champaign, MIT | eveloped the moment distribution method for structural analysis of statically indeterminate structures | |
| Luther W. Graef | Marquette University, University of Wisconsin–Madison | founder of Graef, Anhalt, Schloemer and Associates Inc. | |
| Henry Townley Heald | Illinois Institute of Technology | president of Illinois Institute of Technology | |
| William LeMessurier | University of Massachusetts Lowell, MIT | structural engineer for the Boston City Hall, the Federal Reserve Bank of Boston, the Singapore Treasury Building, and the Dallas Main Center. | |
| Tung-Yen Lin | University of California, Berkeley; University of Kentucky | Structural engineer who was the pioneer of standardizing the use of prestressed concrete | |
| Daniel W. Mead | University of Wisconsin–Madison, Cornell University | Professor at the University of Wisconsin-Madison | |
| Ralph Brazelton Peck | University of Illinois Urbana-Champaign | Civil engineer specializing in soil mechanics and recipient of the National Medal of Science | |
| Lewis A. Pick | Virginia Tech | Chief of Engineers in the United States Army | |
| Leslie E. Robertson | University of California–Berkeley, Stevens Institute of Technology | Structural engineer of the World Trade Center, the U.S. Steel Tower, the Shanghai World Financial Center, and the Bank of China Tower | |
| Hunter Rouse | MIT, University of Illinois Urbana-Champaign | Hydraulician, professor at the Massachusetts Institute of Technology and Columbia University, and dean of the University of Iowa College of Engineering | |
| Mario Salvadori | Manhattan College, Cooper Union | Professor of civil engineering and architecture at Columbia University | |
| John L. Savage | University of Colorado Boulder | Supervised the designs of Hoover Dam, Shasta Dam, Parker Dam and Grand Coulee Dam | |
| David B. Steinman | City College of New York | Designer of the Mackinac Bridge | |
| Leif J. Sverdrup | Missouri University of Science and Technology | General with the U.S. Army Corps of Engineers | |
| Arthur Newell Talbot | University of Illinois Urbana-Champaign | Pioneer in the field of reinforced concrete | |
| Bertram D. Tallamy | Rensselaer Polytechnic Institute | Superintendent of the New York State Department of Public Works and Federal Highway Administrator | |
| Frederick E. Turneaure | University of Wisconsin–Madison | Dean of engineering at the University of Wisconsin–Madison | |
| Abel Wolman | Drexel University | Pioneer of modern sanitary engineering | |
