= Karl Reid =

Karl Reid is the emeritus dean of the College of Engineering, Architecture & Technology, Oklahoma State University–Stillwater and Oklahoma State University–Tulsa, Oklahoma, United States, since 1986. On October 25, 2010, he announced his retirement. His successor, Paul J. Tikalsky, assumed the position on July 1, 2012.

== Background and career ==
He obtained his BS, MS, Mechanical Engineering, Oklahoma State University and Sc.D., MIT. Reid holds four patents in his field, one of which is for a lung ventilator that he developed. He also served as Executive Director of NSBE.
