= Robert Dodds =

Robert Dodds or variation may refer to:

- Robert Dodds (aviator) (1893–1980), Canadian aviator
- Robert H. Dodds Jr., American civil engineer
- Robert R. Dodds (1924–1998), American politician from Iowa
- Bobby Dodds (1923–after 1948), English footballer
- Robert Dodds, shortlisted for the Hampshire Book Awards in 2003
