= Robert H. Dodds Jr. =

- Citizenship: United States
- Education: University of Memphis; University of Illinois
- Spouse: Deana Bland
- Awards: Walter L. Huber Research Prize (1992); George R. Irwin Medal (2000); Munro Prize (2000); Nathan M. Newmark Medal (2001)

Robert H. Dodds Jr. is a professor in the Civil and Environmental Engineering Department at the University of Illinois Urbana-Champaign. He specializes in the field of structural engineering with a focus on non linear fracture mechanics of structural materials. He has done extensive research for the fields of fracture mechanics, fatigue, and engineering software development.

In 2008, Dodds was elected a member of the National Academy of Engineering for contributions in non-linear fracture mechanics and applications to practice in nuclear power and space systems.

== Education ==
For his undergraduate career, Dodds attended the University of Memphis Herff College of Engineering where he studied civil engineering. After attaining his Bachelor of Science (1973), he would leave Memphis and enroll at the University of Illinois Urbana-Champaign. At Illinois, he would go on to receive a Master of Science in civil engineering (1975) and eventually a doctorate of philosophy in Civil engineering (1978).

Dodds has also been a loyal alumni donating annually to both the University of Illinois and the University of Memphis. He also contributed $50,000 to the construction of the M. T. Geoffrey Yeh Student Center, a new addition to the Newmark Civil Engineering Laboratory at the University of Illinois.

== Career ==
After the completion of his post graduate degrees, Dodds would take an associate professor position on the faculty of the University of Kansas teaching civil engineering. After 8 years at Kansas, he returned to the University of Illinois in 1987. Back at Illinois, he served as an assistant professor and eventually received the professor title in 1992 teaching courses in Structural analysis, Finite element method, Fatigue, Fracture mechanics and Software design. Eventually, Dodds was named the Nathan M. Newmark endowed professor of civil engineering from 1996 to 2000. Then, in 2000, he became the inaugural M.T. Geoffrey Yeh endowed chair at the University of Illinois, a title he still maintains today. After continuing to serve as a professor, Dodds was named the head of the civil and environmental engineering department at Illinois in 2004 only to step down to renew his role as a mentor to students and focus on his continued research.

While pursuing his career in higher education, Dodds became the co-editor of Engineering Fracture Mechanics in 1996. He also serves as an associate editor for the International Journal for Engineering with Computers and Engineering computations, as well as, a contributing editor to the International Journal for Mechanics of Advanced Materials and Structures. He has previously served as an associate editor for the ASCE Journal of Structural Engineering.

== Research ==
While educating new generations of civil engineers, Dodds has also made large contributions to the structural engineering society via his research. He has published over 100 journal papers with a focus on non linear fracture mechanics, material fatigue, and the associated computational methods. In addition, he has taken the lead on numerous large scale research projects concerning fracture in structural metals for the US Navy, the US Nuclear Regulatory Commission, and NASA. The conclusions drawn from his research have wide-ranging effects into both different engineering disciplines and industrial applications.

== Honors ==
Dodds has received the following accolades for his research and work with students:

- American Society of Civil Engineers Walter L. Huber Prize (1992)
- Nathan M. Newmark Medal (2001)
- George R. Irwin Medal from ASTM (2000)
- American Society of Testing Materials Award of Merit (2000)
- Munro Prize for best paper published in the International Journal of Engineering Structures (2000) (with his Ph.D. Student Carlos Matos)
- Chi Epsilon Chapter Honor Member (2000)
- Elected to the National Academy of Engineering (2008)
