= List of Theta Xi chapters =

Theta Xi is a collegiate social fraternity in North America. It was founded at Rensselaer Polytechnic Institute in April 1864. In the following list, active chapters are indicated in bold and inactive chapters are indicated in italics.

Chapter	Charter date and range as ΘΞ	Charter date and range as ΚΣΚ	Institution	Location	Status	Ref.
**Alpha**	April 29, 1864		Rensselaer Polytechnic Institute	Troy, New York	Active	(Note: Originally established as Sigma Delta (local) in 1859.)
Beta (Franklin Hall)	April 26, 1865 – 1936		Yale University	New Haven, Connecticut	Inactive	(Note: The oldest traditional fraternities (~junior societies) at Yale named their buildings with "Hall" nicknames, by which they wished to be known on campus: Thus Theta Xi's chapter was Franklin Hall. Similarly, Phi Sigma Kappa adopted the name Sachem Hall, Delta Psi adopted the name St. Anthony Hall which spread to their entire small but old national fraternity, Chi Delta Theta (local literary honorary) established the Manuscript Society, Sigma Delta Chi (local) was renamed the Cloister Club which soon became Book and Snake. Phi Gamma Delta was Vernon Hall which later became Myth and Sword, Chi Phi was York Hall, Psi Upsilon became the Fence Club, and finally, Delta Phi was known at Yale as St. Elmo's.)
**Gamma**	February 20, 1874		Stevens Institute of Technology	Hoboken, New Jersey	Active	
**Delta**	April 29, 1885 – 1897; 1900		Massachusetts Institute of Technology	Boston, Massachusetts	Active	
Epsilon	November 17, 1899 – 1933		Columbia University	New York, New York	Inactive	
Zeta	February 21, 1903 – 1969		Cornell University	Ithaca, New York	Inactive	
Eta	December 3, 1904 – 2019		Lehigh University	Bethlehem, Pennsylvania	Inactive	(Note: Formed from St. Herman's Club (local), established in 1895.)
**Theta**	February 17, 1905 – 2007; 2018		Purdue University	West Lafayette, Indiana	Active	(Note: Re-established as a colony in 2016.)
**Iota**	March 17, 1905		Washington University in St. Louis	St. Louis, Missouri	Active	(Note: Formed from Tau Phi, established in 1904.)
**Kappa**	March 30, 1907		Rose–Hulman Institute of Technology	Terre Haute, Indiana	Active	
Lambda	April 26, 1907 – 1972; 1985–1998		Pennsylvania State University	State College, Pennsylvania	Inactive	(Note: Formed from Delta Sigma Phi, established in 1905. After going dormant, it was re-established in 1985 by a chapter of Kappa Gamma Chi, originally formed in 1980.)
**Mu**	April 2, 1909		Iowa State University	Ames, Iowa	Active	(Note: Formed from Epsilon Sigma, established in 1907.)
**Nu**	March 22, 1910 – 2018		University of California, Berkeley	Berkeley, California	Active	
Xi	March 28, 1912–1960; 1969–1973; 1986–1992		University of Iowa	Iowa City, Iowa	Inactive	(Note: Formed from the local group Wexo, established in 1907. After going dormant, it was re-established as a colony in 1969 and 1984.)
**Omicron**	June 8, 1912 – c. 1992; 1996–201x ?		University of Pennsylvania	Philadelphia, Pennsylvania	Active	(Note: Formed from the Target Club (local), established in 1909. Re-established as a colony in 1995.)
Pi	June 5, 1912–2009		Carnegie Mellon University	Pittsburgh, Pennsylvania	Inactive	(Note: Formed from Gamma Kappa, established in 1908.)
Rho	March 21, 1913 – 1975; 1991–1997		University of Texas at Austin	Austin, Texas	Inactive	(Note: Revived as a colony in 1990.)
**Sigma**	April 10, 1914 – 1986; 1993		University of Michigan	Ann Arbor, Michigan	Active	(Note: Revived as a colony in 1991.)
Tau	March 21, 1914 – 200x ?		Stanford University	Stanford, California	Inactive	
**Upsilon**	April 5, 1915 – 197x ?; 1976–1990; 1998		University of Washington	Seattle, Washington	Active	(Note: Formed from Sigma Epsilon, established in 1914. After going dormant, it reformed as a colony in 1996.)
Phi	March 16, 1917 – 1941		University of Wisconsin–Madison	Madison, Wisconsin	Inactive	
**Chi**	April 16–17, 1920 – 1957; 1996–2005; 2009		Ohio State University	Columbus, Ohio	Active	(Note: Formed from Lambda Phi Omega, established in 1914. After going dormant, it reformed as a colony in 1993 and 2007.)
Psi	April 9, 1920 – 1966		University of Minnesota	Minneapolis, Minnesota	Inactive	
**Omega**	April 8, 1921 – 1942; 1950–1989l; 2000		Washington State University	Pullman, Washington	Active	(Note: Formed from Epsilon Nu Gamma, established in 1919. After going dormant, it was revived as a colony in 1949 and 1995.)
**Alpha Alpha**	April 23, 1921 – 1993; 1999		Louisiana State University	Baton Rouge, Louisiana	Active	(Note: Formed from Phi Alpha, established in 1920. After going dormant, it was revived as a colony in 1995.)
**Alpha Beta**	April 8, 1922		University of Illinois Urbana-Champaign	Champaign, Illinois	Active	(Note: Formed from Pi Pi Rho (local), established in 1915.)
Alpha Gamma	April 20, 1922 – 1998		Illinois Institute of Technology	Chicago, Illinois	Inactive	(Note: Formed from Omega Lambda (local), established in 1908.)
Alpha Delta	February 20, 1927 – 1972		Oregon State University	Corvallis, Oregon	Inactive	(Note: Formed from Chi Alpha Pi (local), established in 1921.)
**Alpha Epsilon**	February 26, 1927		University of Nebraska–Lincoln	Lincoln, Nebraska	Active	(Note: Formed from Mu Sigma (local), established in 1924.)
**Alpha Zeta**	April 7, 1928 – 2005; 2009		University of California, Los Angeles	Los Angeles, California	Active	(Note: Formed from Phi Kappa Chi, established in 1927. After going dormant, it was revived as a colony in 2008.)
**Alpha Eta**	March 20, 1929 – 1961; 1987–1993; 2001		University of Colorado Boulder	Boulder, Colorado	Active	(Note: Formed from Beta Gamma, established in 1924. After going dormant, it was revived as a colony in 1986 and 1998.)
Alpha Theta	November 7, 1931 – 1972		Lafayette College	Easton, Pennsylvania	Inactive	(Note: Formed from the Elms Club, established in 1922.)
**Alpha Iota**	November 7, 1931 – 1965; 1972		Kansas State University	Manhattan, Kansas	Active	(Note: Originally Beta Pi Epsilon, established in 1923.) (Note: Reformed as a colony in 1970.)
Alpha Kappa	October 29, 1932 – 1988		Northwestern University	Evanston, Illinois	Inactive	(Note: Originally the Monaco Club, established in 1921.)
Alpha Lambda	November 18, 1932 – 1982		University of Alabama	Tuscaloosa, Alabama	Active	(Note: Originally Tau Omega Chi, established in 1926.)
Alpha Mu	November 4, 1932 –1957		Amherst College	Amherst, Massachusetts	Withdrew	(Note: Originally Sigma Delta Rho, established in 1923.) (Note: After disaffiliating in 1957, this chapter continued as a men's local called Alpha Theta Xi, later a co-ed local. It eventually dropped the Greek letters entirely to become a co-educational cooperative called Humphries House. See Sigma Delta Rho (local).)
Alpha Nu	April 13, 1940 – 1993; 2001–2018; 2024		University of Southern California	Los Angeles, California	Active	(Note: Originally Phi Nu Alpha, establish in 1902.) (Note: Reformed as a colony in 1998.)
Alpha Xi	April 27, 1940 – 1960		Mississippi State University	Starkville, Mississippi	Inactive	(Note: Established as a colony in 1939.)
**Alpha Omicron**	May 26, 1946 – 1999; 2009		University of Louisiana at Lafayette	Lafayette, Louisiana	Active	(Note: Originally Tau Sigma Delta, established in 1919.) (Note: Reformed as a colony in 2003.)
Alpha Pi	February 5, 1943 – 1972		University of Connecticut	Storrs, Connecticut	Inactive	(Note: Originally Pi Alpha Pi, established in 1925.)
Alpha Rho	March 31, 1949 – 1960		University of Oklahoma	Norman, Oklahoma	Inactive	(Note: Established as a colony in 1948.)
**Alpha Sigma**	October 3, 1948		Bradley University	Peoria, Illinois	Active	(Note: Originally was established as Omicron Sigma (local) in 1924. In 1926 it became Beta Phi Theta's Delta chapter, and at dissolution of that national, accepted a charter into Theta Xi.)
Alpha Tau	February 19, 1949 – 1959; 1967–1979		Indiana University	Bloomington, Indiana	Inactive	(Note: Originally Alpha Kappa Epsilon, established in 1947.) (Note: Reformed as a colony in 1960.)
Alpha Upsilon	April 3, 1949 – 1958; 1971–1984		Louisiana Tech University	Ruston, Louisiana	Inactive	(Note: Established as a colony in 1948. Re-established in 1971 by a chapter of Gamma Tau Epsilon, originally formed in 1966.)
Alpha Phi	May 14, 1949 – 1962		University of South Dakota	Vermillion, South Dakota	Inactive	(Note: Established as a colony in 1948.)
Alpha Chi	May 21, 1949 – 1970		Trinity College	Hartford, Connecticut	Inactive	(Note: Established as a colony in 1948.)
**Alpha Psi**	October 8, 1949		Missouri University of Science and Technology	Rolla, Missouri	Active	(Note: Originally Chi Sigma, established in 1946.)
Alpha Omega	May 20, 1950 – 1959		Michigan State University	East Lansing, Michigan	Inactive	(Note: Originally the Delta Club, established in 1948.)
**Beta Alpha**	January 27, 1951		Georgia Institute of Technology	Atlanta, Georgia	Active	(Note: Founded as a colony in 1948.)
Beta Beta	February 10, 1951 – 1970		San Jose State University	San Jose, California	Inactive	(Note: Originally Mu Delta Pi, established in 1944.)
Beta Gamma	April 21, 1951 – 1953		Bowling Green State University	Bowling Green, Ohio	Inactive	(Note: Originally Gamma Theta Nu, established in 1947.)
Beta Delta	November 17, 1951 – 1974; 1986–2013		Southern Illinois University	Carbondale, Illinois	Inactive	(Note: Originally Kappa Delta Alpha, established in 1933. Reformed in 1985 as a colony.)
**Beta Epsilon**	May 31, 1952		University of California, Davis	Davis, California	Active	(Note: Started as a colony in 1950.)
**Beta Zeta**	February 25, 1954 – 200x ?; 2011–2017; November 11, 2021		Auburn University	Auburn, Alabama	Active	(Note: Started as a colony in 1950. Reformed as a colony in 2007.)
Beta Eta	May 22, 1954 – 1980; 1992–199x ?		University of Northern Colorado	Greeley, Colorado	Inactive	(Note: Originally Phi Delta Pi, established in 1925. Reformed as a colony in 1925.)
Beta Theta	November 9, 1957 – 1974		Western Michigan University	Kalamazoo, Michigan	Inactive	(Note: Started as a colony in 1956.)
Beta Iota	May 8, 1957 – 1964		University of Missouri	Columbia, Missouri	Inactive	(Note: Started as a colony in 1956.)
Beta Kappa	May 10, 1958 – 1988		Clarkson University	Potsdam, New York	Inactive	(Note: Originally Nu Phi, established in 1957.)
Beta Lambda	October 28, 1961 – 1988		Indiana University of Pennsylvania	Indiana, Pennsylvania	Inactive	(Note: Originally Delta Gamma Phi, established in 1958.)
Beta Mu	May 12, 1962 – 1982		University of Central Arkansas	Conway, Arkansas	Inactive	(Note: Originally Phi Alpha Zeta, established in 1936.)
Kappa Alpha	August 20, 1962 – 1974	September 5, 1939 – 1962	Youngstown State University	Youngstown, Ohio	Inactive	(Note: Formed by the merger with the fraternity Kappa Sigma Kappa. This chapter was originally established as Kappa Sigma Kappa in 1939.)
Kappa Beta	August 20, 1962– 1982	January 14, 1942 – 1962	University of Arkansas at Monticello	Monticello, Arkansas	Inactive	(Note: Formed by the merger with the fraternity Kappa Sigma Kappa. This chapter was originally established as Kappa Sigma Kappa in 1942.)
Kappa Gamma	August 20, 1962 – 1994	October 2, 1945 – 1962	Fairmont State University	Fairmont, West Virginia	Inactive	(Note: Formed by the merger with the fraternity Kappa Sigma Kappa. This chapter was originally established as Kappa Sigma Kappa in 1945.) (Note: Became Sigma Delta Phi after 1994.)
Kappa Delta	August 20, 1962 – 1988	April 30, 1946 – 1962	Indiana Institute of Technology	Fort Wayne, Indiana	Inactive	
Kappa Epsilon	August 20, 1962 – 1978	May 1, 1946 – 1962	Concord University	Athens, West Virginia	Inactive	(Note: Formed by the merger with the fraternity Kappa Sigma Kappa. This chapter was originally established as Kappa Sigma Kappa in 1946.)
Kappa Zeta	August 20, 1962 – 1977	April 16, 1947 – 1962	University of Charleston	Charleston, West Virginia	Inactive	(Note: Formed by the merger with the fraternity Kappa Sigma Kappa. This chapter was originally established as Kappa Sigma Kappa in 1947.)
Kappa Eta	August 20, 1962 – 1986	April 28, 1947 – 1962	Glenville State College	Glenville, West Virginia	Inactive	(Note: Formed by the merger with the fraternity Kappa Sigma Kappa. This chapter was originally established as Kappa Sigma Kappa in 1947.)
Kappa Theta	August 20, 1962 – 1997; 2007–2021	June 10, 1947 – 1962	Western Illinois University	Macomb, Illinois	Inactive	(Note: Formed by the merger with the fraternity Kappa Sigma Kappa. This chapter was originally established as Kappa Sigma Kappa in 1947.) (Note: Reformed as a colony in 2003.)
Kappa Iota	August 20, 1962 – 1976: 1993–2011	November 19, 1947 – 1962	Henderson State University	Arkadelphia, Arkansas	Inactive	(Note: Formed by the merger with the fraternity Kappa Sigma Kappa. This chapter was originally established as Kappa Sigma Kappa in 1947.) (Note: Reformed as a colony in 1990.)
Kappa Kappa	August 20, 1962 – 200x ?	December 18, 1947 – 1962	Ball State University	Muncie, Indiana	Inactive	(Note: Formed by the merger with the fraternity Kappa Sigma Kappa. This chapter was originally established as Kappa Sigma Kappa in 1947.)
Kappa Lambda	August 20, 1962 – 1972	March 3, 1949 – 1962	Old Dominion University	Norfolk, Virginia	Inactive	(Note: Formed by the merger with the fraternity Kappa Sigma Kappa. This chapter was originally established as Kappa Sigma Kappa in 1949.)
Kappa Mu	August 20, 1962 – 1991	March 30, 1949 – 1962	Rochester Institute of Technology	Rochester, New York	Inactive	(Note: Formed by the merger with the fraternity Kappa Sigma Kappa. This chapter was originally established as Kappa Sigma Kappa in 1949.)
Kappa Nu	August 20, 1962 – 1997	November 2, 1949 – 1962	Defiance College	Defiance, Ohio	Inactive	(Note: Formed by the merger with the fraternity Kappa Sigma Kappa. This chapter was originally established as Kappa Sigma Kappa in 1949.)
Kappa Xi	August 20, 1962 – 1976	November 19, 1949 – 1962	University of Detroit Mercy	Detroit, Michigan	Inactive	(Note: Formed by the merger with the fraternity Kappa Sigma Kappa. This chapter was originally established as Kappa Sigma Kappa in 1949.)
**Kappa Omicron**	August 20, 1962	September 25, 1950 – 1962	Lenoir–Rhyne University	Hickory, North Carolina	Active	(Note: Formed by the merger with the fraternity Kappa Sigma Kappa. This chapter was originally established as Kappa Sigma Kappa in 1950.)
Kappa Pi	August 20, 1962 – 1972	April 6, 1951 – 1962	Wayne State University	Detroit, Michigan	Inactive	(Note: Formed by the merger with the fraternity Kappa Sigma Kappa. This chapter was originally established as Kappa Sigma Kappa in 1951.)
Kappa Rho	August 20, 1962 – 1977	May 15, 1951 – 1962	Ferris State University	Big Rapids, Michigan	Inactive	(Note: Formed by the merger with the fraternity Kappa Sigma Kappa. This chapter was originally established as Kappa Sigma Kappa in 1951.)
**Kappa Sigma**	August 20, 1962	July 10, 1954 – 1962	Kettering University	Flint, Michigan	Active	(Note: Formed by the merger with the fraternity Kappa Sigma Kappa. This chapter was originally established as Kappa Sigma Kappa in 1954.)
**Kappa Tau**	August 20, 1962	December 2, 1955 – 1962	West Virginia Wesleyan College	Buckhannon, West Virginia	Active	(Note: Formed by the merger with the fraternity Kappa Sigma Kappa. This chapter was originally established as Kappa Sigma Kappa in 1955.)
Kappa Upsilon	August 20, 1962 – 1978	April 21, 1956 – 1962	Utica University	Utica, New York	Inactive	(Note: Formed by the merger with the fraternity Kappa Sigma Kappa. This chapter was originally established as Kappa Sigma Kappa in 1956.)
**Kappa Phi**	August 20, 1962 – 2006; 2013	April 12, 1958 – 1962	Western Carolina University	Cullowhee, North Carolina	Active	(Note: Formed by the merger with the fraternity Kappa Sigma Kappa. This chapter was originally established as Kappa Sigma Kappa in 1958.)
Kappa Chi	October 5, 1968 – 1977		Lawrence Technological University	Southfield, Michigan	Inactive	(Note: Originally Kappa Chi, formed in 1948.)
Beta Nu	September 3, 1962 – 2003		University of Nebraska at Kearney	Kearney, Nebraska	Inactive	(Note: Originally Sigma Upsilon Nu, established in 1956.)
**Beta Xi**	January 11, 1963		University of New Orleans	New Orleans, Louisiana	Active	(Note: Formed from Delta Gamma Chi, established in 1959.)
Beta Omicron	May 11, 1963 – 1981; 1991–2004; 2013–2015		Clarion University of Pennsylvania	Clarion, Pennsylvania	Inactive	
**Beta Pi**	October 27, 1963 – 2003; 20xx ? – 2020; 2023		Southeastern Louisiana University	Hammond, Louisiana	Active	(Note: Originally Theta Psi, established in 1953. Reformed as a colony in 2005 and 2023.)
Beta Rho	November 17, 1963 – 1970		Emporia State University	Emporia, Kansas	Inactive	(Note: Originally Tau Phi Delta, established in 1961.)
**Beta Sigma**	May 28, 1965		California University of Pennsylvania	California, Pennsylvania	Active	(Note: Originally Kappa Theta Gamma, established in 1962.)
Beta Tau	December 12, 1965 – 1992		Texas State University	San Marcos, Texas	Inactive	(Note: Originally Theta Sigma Chi, established in 1963.)
**Beta Upsilon**	May 14, 1966 – 1978,; 1987		Slippery Rock University	Slippery Rock, Pennsylvania	Active	(Note: Originally Omega Psi, established in 1966. Reformed as a colony in 1986.)
**Beta Phi**	November 5, 1966 – 1992; 2021		West Liberty University	West Liberty, West Virginia	Active	(Note: Originally Beta Gamma, established in 1954. Revived as a colony in 2017.)
Beta Chi	February 2, 1969 – 1972		Merrimack College	North Andover, Massachusetts	Inactive	(Note: Originally Sigma Beta Kappa, established in 1953.)
Beta Psi	February 14, 1970 – 1979		University of Louisiana at Monroe	Monroe, Louisiana	Inactive	(Note: Originally Alpha Theta Xi, established in 1969.)
Beta Omega	April 6, 1972 – 2019		Virginia Tech	Blacksburg, Virginia	Inactive	(Note: Originally Tau Beta Upsilon, established in 1965.)
**Gamma Alpha**	October 27, 1972 – 1997; 2003		Shepherd College	Shepherdstown, West Virginia	Active	(Note: Established as a colony in 1971; reformed as a colony in 2000.)
**Gamma Beta**	April 13, 1973 – 2007; December 8, 2024		Florida Institute of Technology	Melbourne, Florida	Active	(Note: Originally Delta Delta Tau, established in 1967.)
Gamma Gamma	February 16, 1974 – 1984		University of South Alabama	Mobile, Alabama	Inactive	
Gamma Delta	February 21, 1976 –1991		Loyola University Chicago	Chicago, Illinois	Inactive	(Note: Established it as a colony in 1973.)
**Gamma Epsilon**	April 7, 1984		Southeast Missouri State University	Cape Girardeau, Missouri	Active	(Note: Established it as a colony in 1983.)
Gamma Zeta	May 15, 1987 – 1991		Valdosta State University	Valdosta, Georgia	Inactive	(Note: Established it as a colony in 1984.)
Gamma Eta	February 10, 1989 – 2014		Nicholls State University	Thibodaux, Louisiana	Inactive	(Note: Established it as a colony in 1987.)
Gamma Theta	September 16, 1989 – 2011		Lake Superior State University	Sault Ste. Marie, Michigan	Inactive	(Note: Originally Gamma Theta Xi, established in 1987.)
**Gamma Iota**	January 5, 1991		Embry–Riddle Aeronautical University	Prescott, Arizona	Active	(Note: Established it as a colony in 1989.)
**Gamma Kappa**	March 16, 1991		University of Illinois at Chicago	Chicago, Illinois	Active	(Note: Established it as a colony in 1988.)
Gamma Lambda	January 18, 1992 – 20xx ?		Edinboro University of Pennsylvania	Edinboro, Pennsylvania	Inactive	(Note: Established it as a colony in 1990.)
**Gamma Mu**	May 2, 1992		Montclair State University	Upper Montclair, New Jersey	Active	(Note: Established it as a colony in 1990.)
Gamma Nu	May 2, 1992 – 2000		University of Delaware	Newark, Delaware	Inactive	(Note: Established it as a colony in 1991.)
Gamma Xi	May 14, 1994 – 2016		Monmouth University	West Long Branch, New Jersey	Inactive	(Note: Established it as a colony in 1991.)
Gamma Omicron	April 20, 1996 – 2000		Lynn University	Boca Raton, Florida	Inactive	(Note: Established it as a colony in 1995.)
Gamma Pi	April 18, 1998 – 201x ?		University of North Carolina, Pembroke	Pembroke, North Carolina	Inactive	(Note: Established it as a colony in 1994.)
Gamma Rho	April 18, 1998 – 2003		Missouri Western State University	St. Joseph, Missouri	Inactive	(Note: Established it as a colony in 1994.)
Gamma Sigma	March 6, 1999 — 2021		University of Wisconsin–Stevens Point	Stevens Point, Wisconsin	Inactive	(Note: Established it as a colony in 1993.)
Gamma Tau	November 17, 2002 – 2021		Texas Tech University	Lubbock, Texas	Inactive	(Note: Established it as a colony in 2002.)
Gamma Upsilon	Spring 2006 – 20xx ?		Greensboro College	Greensboro, North Carolina	Inactive	(Note: Formed from the Greek Leadership Society, established in 1999.)
**Gamma Phi**	April 26, 2008		Georgia Southern University	Statesboro, Georgia	Active	(Note: Established as a colony in 2007.)
**Gamma Chi**	March 26, 2011		Shippensburg University	Shippensburg, Pennsylvania	Active	(Note: Established as a colony in 2010.)
**Gamma Psi**	November 18, 2017		University of Arizona	Tucson, Arizona	Active	(Note: Established as a colony in 2015.)
**Gamma Omega**	2018		Colorado Mesa University	Grand Junction, Colorado	Active	(Note: Established as a colony in 2016.)
**Delta Alpha**	2017		Arizona State University	Tempe, Arizona	Active	(Note: Established as a colony in 2016.)
**Delta Beta**	2021		Kennesaw State University	Marietta, Georgia	Active	(Note: Established as a colony in 2018.)
**Delta Gamma**	March 26, 2022		University of Rhode Island	Kingston, Rhode Island	Active	(Note: Established as a colony in 2019.)
**Colony**	2018		Lindenwood University	St. Charles, Missouri	Active	
**Colony**	2001 – 2005		University of Wisconsin-Superior	Superior, Wisconsin	Inactive	
