= Newmark Civil Engineering Laboratory =

Coordinates: 40.1137°N 88.2271°W

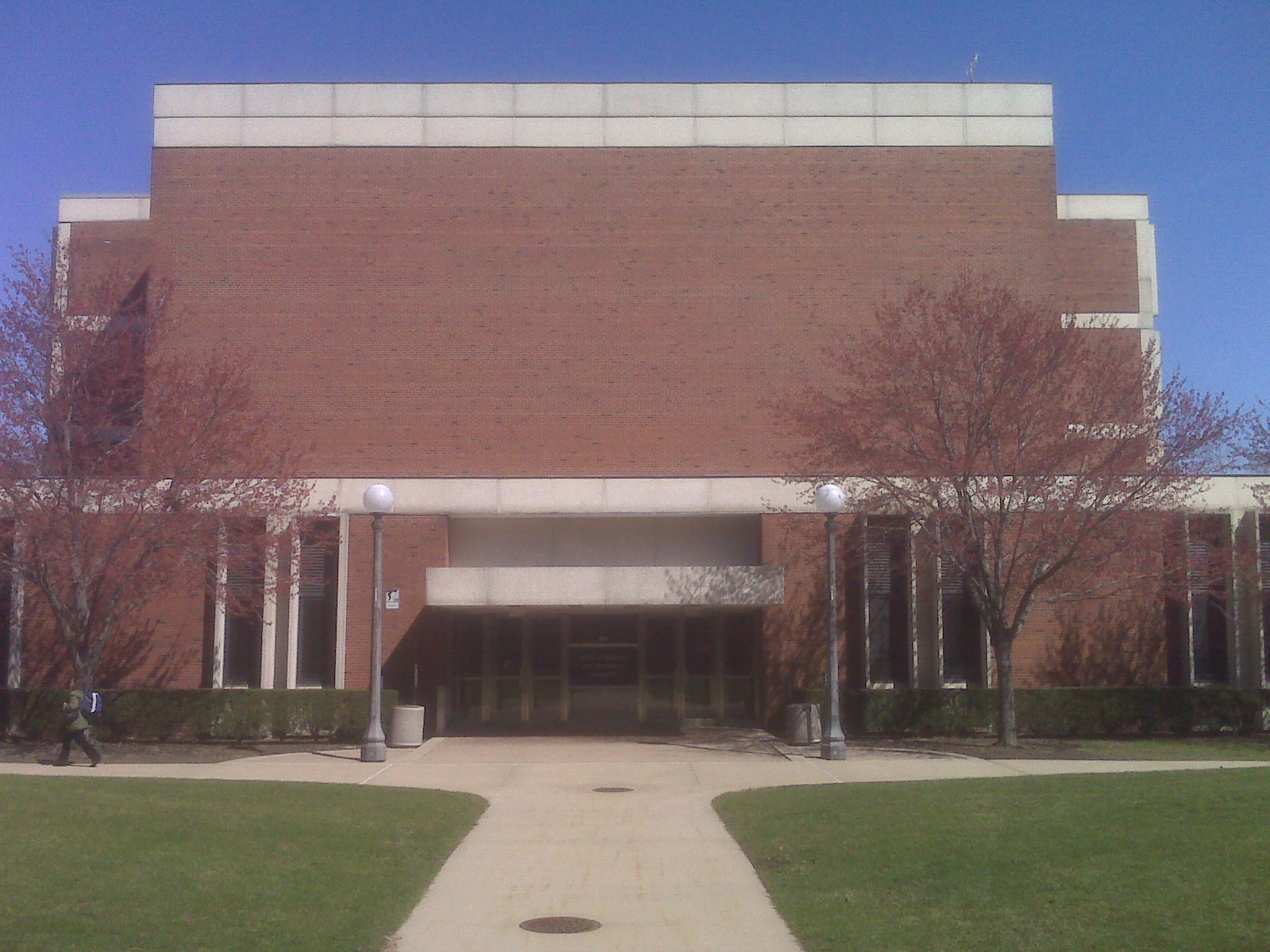
The Newmark Lab main entrance

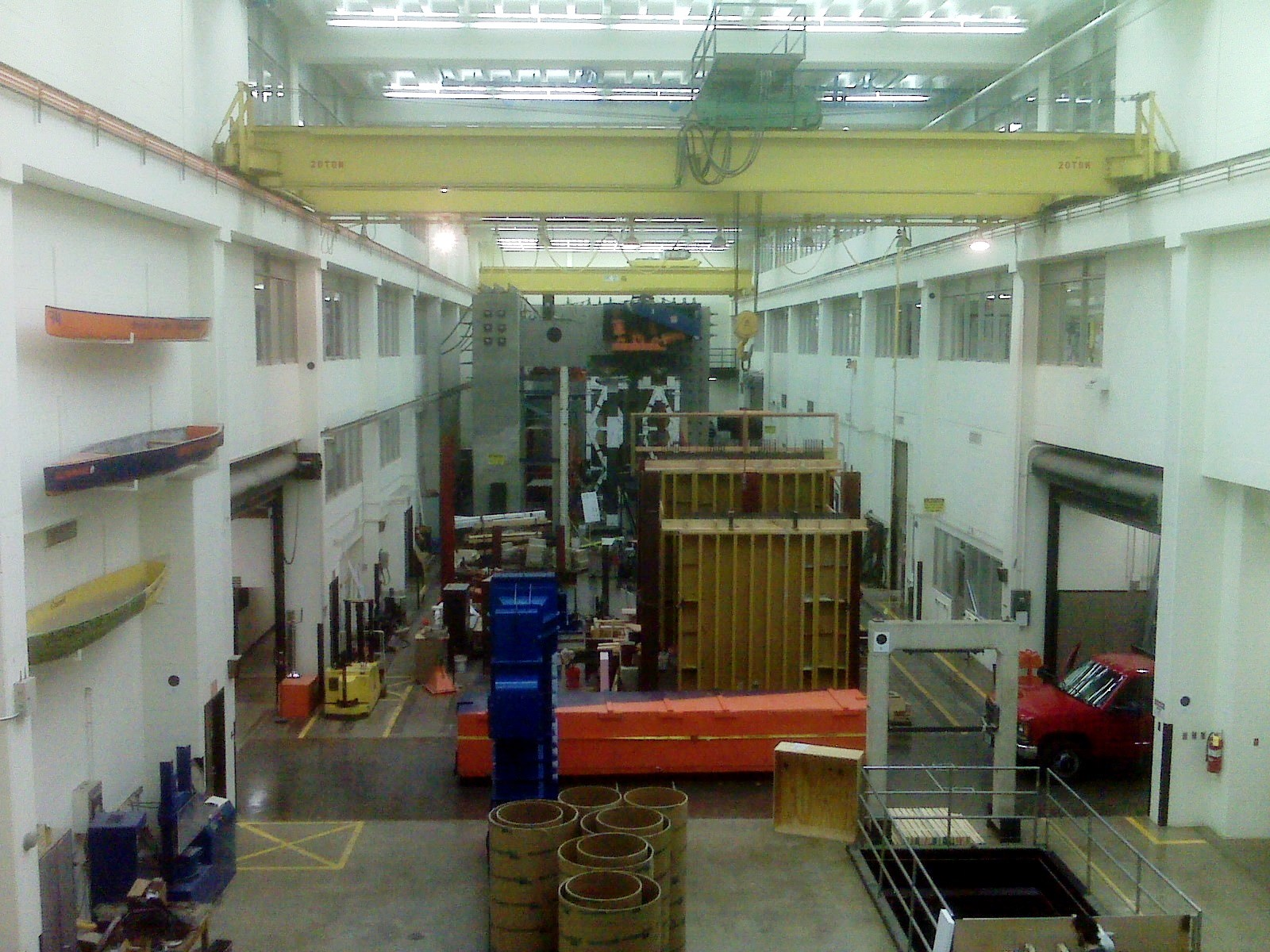
Newmark Lab Crane Bay

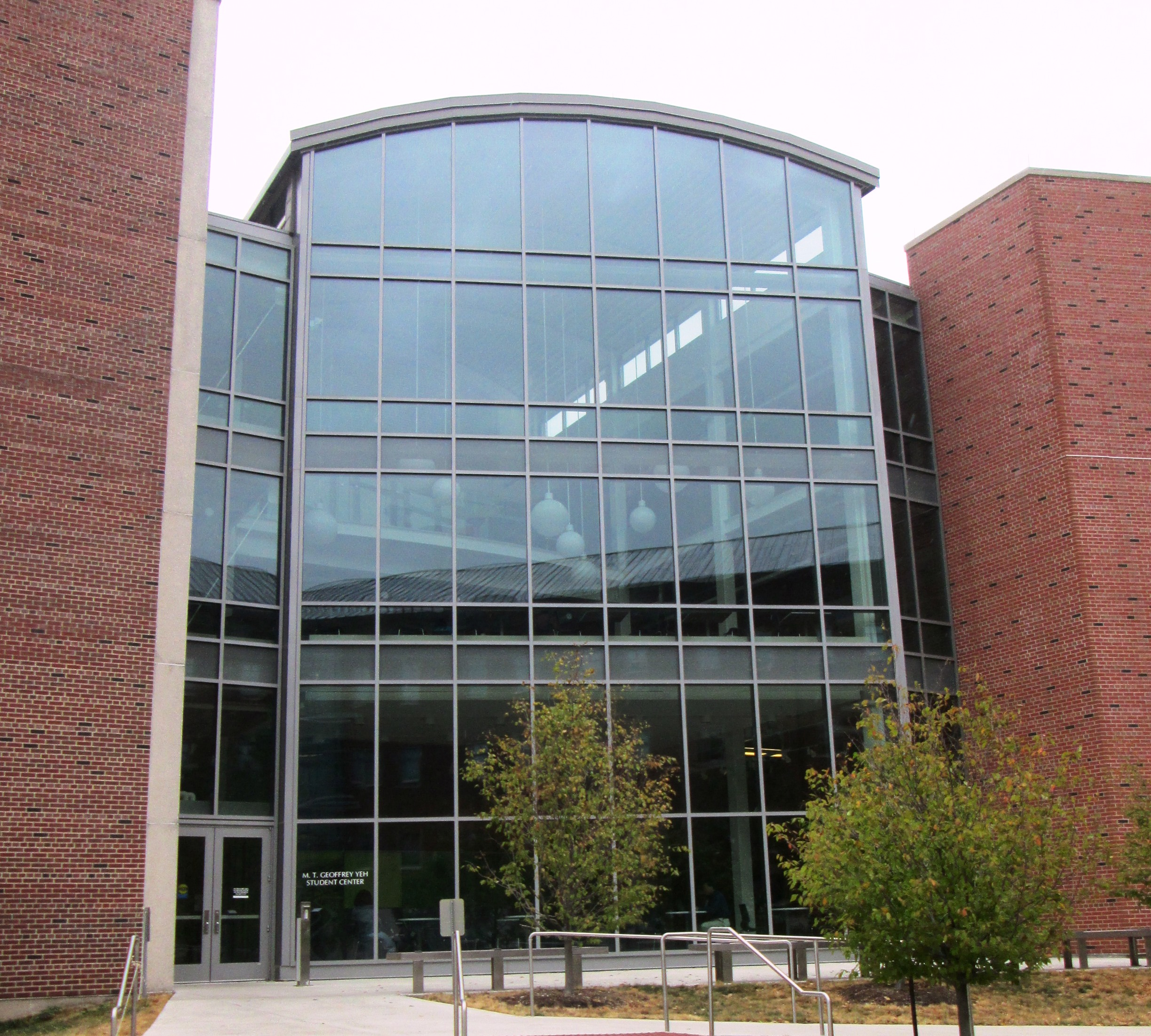
Entrance to the Yeh Student Center

The Nathan M. Newmark Civil Engineering Laboratory, or Newmark Lab, located at 205 N. Mathews Avenue in Urbana, Illinois on the campus of the University of Illinois at Urbana–Champaign, houses the university's Department of Civil and Environmental Engineering. The Lab was built in 1967, and has been modified and updated a number of times since then. The facility was named after professor and department head Nathan M. Newmark after his death.

The building consists of classrooms and offices surrounding a large open area called the crane bay for large scale experiments, including those of the Newmark Structural Engineering Lab (NSEL). Newmark also contains a professional machine shop where students and faculty can have material fabricated by the staffed professionals, and a student instrumentation workshop where students and faculty can fabricate materials themselves.

In 2011, the M. T. Geoffrey Yeh Student Center was added to the building.

== Crane bay ==
The crane bay is a large open area in the center of Newmark Laboratory with a three-story height. It is where much of the department's structural research and testing is done. There are large doors on both the north and south sides of this area, where trucks and equipment can move through. The crane bay gets its name from two large yellow hydraulic cranes on rails above the room, which move heavy equipment around. The crane bay houses many structural analysis equipment, including a concrete cylinder crusher for strength tests and beam deflection measurement devices. There is also a 28-foot-tall (8.5 m) L-shaped concrete reaction wall with hydraulic actuators, which was added in 2004. The crane bay's large open size is also sometimes used for departmental events such as Engineering Open House and the department's annual career fair.

== M. T. Geoffrey Yeh Student Center ==
In 2011, an addition called the M. T. Geoffrey Yeh Student Center, designed by Teng & Associates, was completed at the cost of $7 million, adding 20,500 square feet (1,900 m^{2}) of classrooms, student study space and meeting rooms. The Yeh Center was funded entirely with private gifts, in particular a $4 million gift from M. T. Geoffrey Yeh, a 1953 graduate of the Department of Civil Engineering. Yeh is chairman of Hsin Chong International Holdings, Ltd., a large construction company in China.

The remainder of the funding for the addition came from private sources including alumni and corporate sponsors, and $1.0 million contributions by both the Department of Civil and Environmental Engineering and the College of Engineering. It opened in time for the start of classes in fall 2011.

== Organizations that use Newmark facilities ==
Many student and professional research organizations use Newmark's facilities for various projects and events.

Student

- American Society of Civil Engineers – This society is a student chapter of the national professional organization. ASCE uses Newmark for many social and service events.
- American Concrete Institute – This society is a student chapter of the national professional organization. ACI uses Newmark for general meetings and other events.
- Steel Bridge Team – The Steel Bridge Team designs, fabricates and assembles a steel bridge every year in a competition against teams from other universities. The team fabricates many of their parts in the student workshop of Newmark, and assembles the bridge and stores it in the crane bay. They also store bridges from previous years in the basement of Newmark.
- Boneyard Yacht Club – Concrete Canoe Team fabricates and then races a concrete canoe every year in a competition against teams from other universities. The canoe team fabricates their canoe in the basement of Newmark, and displays canoes of previous years on a wall of the crane bay.

Professional

- Mid-American Earthquake Center – The MAE Center at UIUC is one of three national earthquake engineering research centers established by the National Science Foundation. Its offices are located on the first floor of Newmark Laboratory.
