= Frederick E. Turneaure =

American civil engineer and educator (1866–1951)

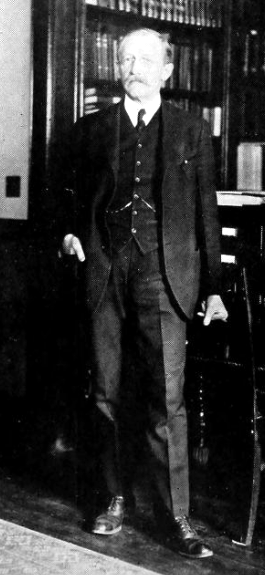
- Born: July 30, 1866; Freeport, Illinois, US
- Died: March 31, 1951 (aged 84); Madison, Wisconsin, US
- Resting place: Forest Hill Cemetery
- Education: Cornell University
- Spouse: Mary D. Stuart (m. 1891)
- Children: 1
- Scientific career
- Fields: Civil engineering
- Workplaces: Lehigh Valley Railroad; Chesapeake and Ohio Railway; Washington University

Frederick Eugene Turneaure (July 30, 1866 – March 31, 1951) was an American civil engineer and academic from Illinois. A graduate of Cornell University, Turneaure briefly worked in the private sector before joining Washington University in St. Louis as an instructor. In 1892, he was named a professor at the University of Wisconsin–Madison. Turneaure was Dean of Engineering there from 1902 to 1937.

== Early life ==
Frederick Eugene Turneaure was born near Freeport, Illinois, on July 30, 1866. He was raised on the family farm and attended public schools, studying algebra and geometry in his free time. Turneaure attended Freeport High School intermittently from 1882 to 1884, then taught a school. After receiving a scholarship for proficiency in mathematics, he matriculated at Cornell University, where he studied civil engineering.

== Career ==
Turneaure graduated in 1889, and took a job with the Lehigh Valley Railroad. After a year, he joined the Chesapeake and Ohio Railway, where he worked until 1890.

Washington University in St. Louis hired Turneaure as an instructor of civil engineering. With Dean John Butler Johnson and Edge Moor Bridge Company engineer C. W. Bryan, Turneaure co-authored The Theory and Practice of Modern Framed Structures, later published in 1902. In 1892, Turneaure was offered a position as professor of the Department of Bridge and Sanitary Engineering at the University of Wisconsin–Madison. He published Public Water-Supplies: Requirements, Resources, and the Construction of Works with Harry Luman Russell in 1901.

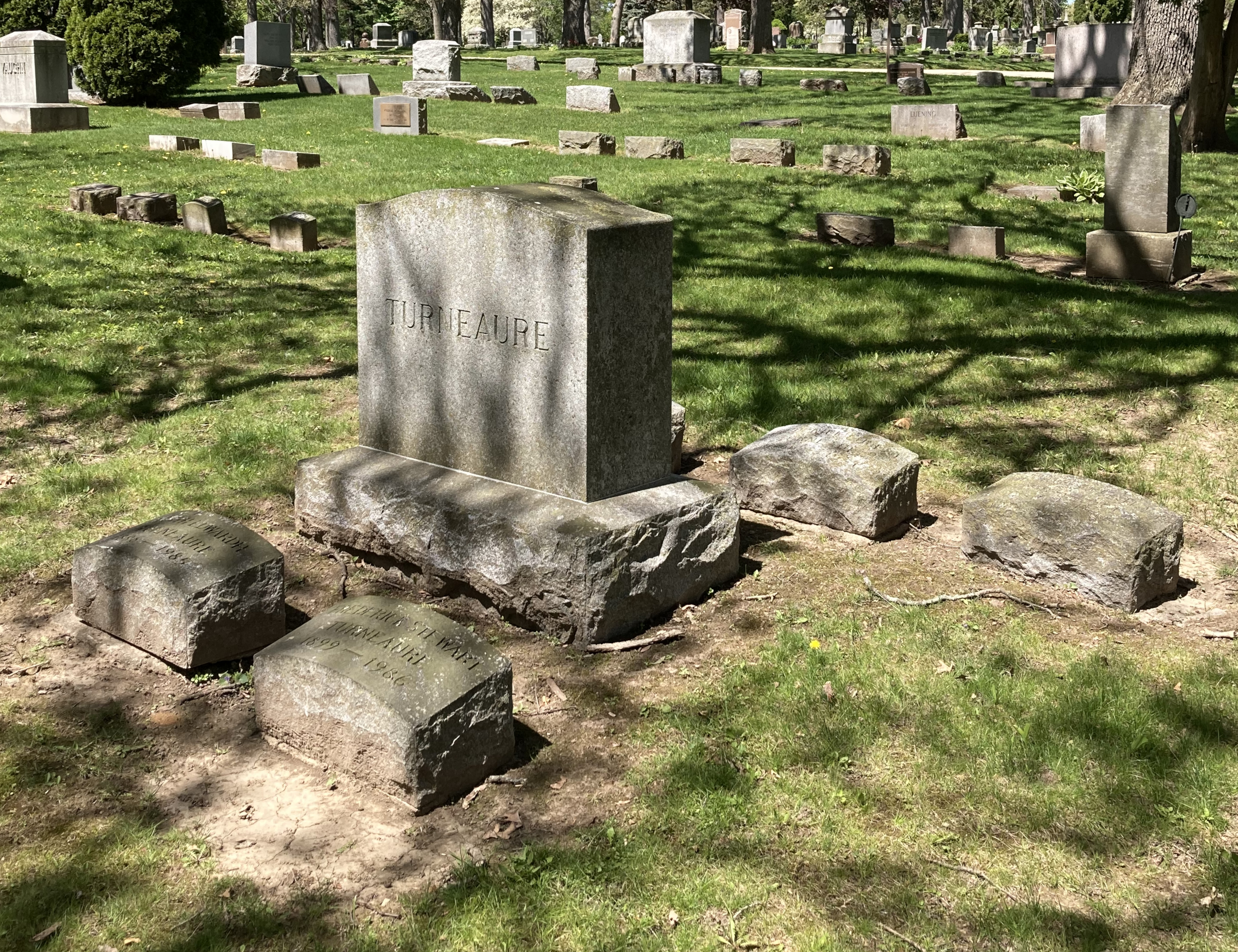
Turneaure's grave at Forest Hill Cemetery

From 1900 to 1901, Turneaure also worked as the City Engineer of Madison, designing a septic sewage disposal plant and a pump system for artesian wells. Turneaure was then elected as an alderman of the 5th ward on the Madison Common Council. He was named Dean of Engineering in 1902. From 1911 to 1929, he was a member of the state highway commission. He retired in 1937 and was named Dean Emeritus.

== Personal life ==
Turneaure married Mary D. Stuart, who he met at Cornell, in 1891. She frequently assisted Frederick with his projects. They had one son. Turneaure died in Madison on March 31, 1951. He was buried at Forest Hill Cemetery.
