= Paul J. Tikalsky =

American engineer

Paul J. Tikalsky is an American engineer who was the Dean of the College of Engineering, Architecture and Technology at Oklahoma State University from 2012 to 2023. He also served as the Regents Service Professor and as the Donald and Cathy Humphreys Endowed Chair of Engineering.

== Early Life & Education ==
Tikalsky was raised in New Holstein, Wisconsin as one of nine siblings. He earned his Bachelor's degree in civil engineering from the University of Wisconsin-Madison as a first-generation student. He earned his PhD at the University of Texas at Austin in 1989, completing a dissertation on the effects of fly ash on sulfate resistance in concrete.

== Career ==
Tikalsky's first faculty position was at Santa Clara University from 1989-1995. While at Santa Clara, he was a summer research fellow with the Army Corps of Engineers at the Waterways Experiment Station. He then held a position at Pennsylvania State University from 1995-2005 before being named chair of the department of Civil and Environmental Engineering at the University of Utah. While at Utah, he oversaw the construction of the Floyd & Jeri Meldrum Civil Engineering Building from 2009-2010. In 2012, Tikalsky was inducted into the Engineering Academy of the Czech Republic for his contributions to Czech engineering and fostering academic relationships between the Czech Republic and the United States. He was also named Utah's ASEE Engineering Educator of the Year.

In 2012, Tikalsky was hired to serve as Dean of the College of Engineering, Architecture and Technology at Oklahoma State. As Dean, he led initiatives to significantly raise graduation and retention rates in the college and developed new and existing campus facilities. In 2023, Tikalsky was named a Fulbright Scholar by the U.S. State Department and served as a Fulbright Specialist in Namangan, Uzbekistan. That same year, he also announced his decision to step down from his position as Dean, citing the length of his tenure and strategic differences with the incoming university president at the time.

Tikalsky is the current chairman of the American Concrete Institute's Financial Advisory Committee. He now lives in Wisconsin, and maintains a license as a Professional Engineer.
