= Phi Tau Theta =

American religious fraternity (1925–1941)

- ΦΤΘ
- Founded: April 7, 1925; 100 years ago Lincoln, Nebraska, US
- Type: Social
- Affiliation: Independent
- Status: Merged
- Merge date: 1941
- Successor: Sigma Theta Epsilon (originally named Delta Sigma Theta)
- Emphasis: Methodist
- Scope: National
- Publication: Philoi
- Chapters: 12
- Headquarters: United States

Phi Tau Theta (ΦΤΘ) was an American religious fraternity for Methodist men. It was established in 1925 and had chapters, mostly in the midwest. Through a merger and name change, it became part of Sigma Theta Epsilon in 1941.

== History ==
Methodist men in the Wesley Foundation at the University of South Dakota had formed a religious fraternity called Phi Lambda Phi. They decided that members of other Wesley Foundations had similar, fraternal-minded groups which could benefit from the formation of a national fraternity. This idea was brought up at a student council retreat held in Ames, Iowa, in 1924. In February 1925, invitations were sent to all Wesley Foundation units asking those interested to send representatives to an organizational meeting.

This meeting was held in Lincoln, Nebraska, on April 6 and 7, 1925. It was attended by members of Phi Lambda Phi of the University of South Dakota, the Wesley Guild of the University of Nebraska, the Young Men’s Club of the University of Minnesota, and Methodist men’s organizations of Iowa State College, the University of Oklahoma, and Pennsylvania State University. Articles of Federation were drawn up and submitted to the individual groups for ratification and national officers were elected, and thus a national religious fraternity for Methodist men to be known as Phi Tau Theta was born. The group was modeled after the Holy Club of the University of Oxford.

The Methodist men’s groups from Iowa State (Alpha chapter), the University of Nebraska (Beta chapter), the University of South Dakota (Gamma chapter), and the University of Minnesota (Delta chapter) ratified the Articles of Federation and became the four charter chapters of Phi Tau Theta. The group from Pennsylvania State did not ratify the Articles and the group from the University of Oklahoma had previously withdrawn when it was proposed that a chapter of the fraternity should be organized for Methodist men of the Negro race. The fraternity's first national conclave was held at Iowa State College on December 19–21, 1925. The conclave adopted a constitution, drafted rituals, and set up other machinery necessary for the proper functioning of a national fraternity.

The spirit of the group was expressed in the Preamble to the national constitution which was drafted by Lee Carpenter of the Nebraska chapter and W. Meyer of the South Dakota chapter and adopted by the first Conclave:

"Appreciating the need of a closer spiritual fellowship among men of Methodist preference in attendance at universities and colleges, and believing also that a fraternal organization of young men can do much to stimulate the development of high moral standards of college men and believing also that college and university men of Methodist preference, if so organized can have a more effective influence upon the student life, we hereby unite ourselves as Phi Tau Theta (Friends of God) a fraternity of Christian men for the promotion of these ideals."

In line with this spirit and desire to "bring Methodist men into closer fellowship with each other and with the church, thus bringing them closer to God", five purposes of the fraternity were adopted:

- To create a more intimate spiritual fellowship among Methodist men and to organize our life around Jesus Christ as the Master of life.
- To develop leadership in the church, both as laymen and as professional workers.
- To promote the study of the Bible.
- To acquaint Methodist men with the history, activities, and purposes of the church.
- To promote clean social activities among its members.

Phi Tau Theta began to grow and develop, with the Epsilon chapter formed at the University of Iowa in October 1927. The Zeta chapter was installed at the University of California, Berkeley sometime in 1928. Over the next decade the fraternity added Eta chapter at the Iowa State Teachers College (UNI), Theta chapter at Ohio University, Iota chapter at the University of Wyoming, Kappa chapter at Ohio State University, Lambda chapter at Kansas State University, Mu chapter at West Virginia University. At the 1938 national conclave in Cedar Falls, Iowa, members attended from ten chapters. However, when the Nu chapter at Oklahoma Agricultural and Mechanical College (OU-Stillwater) was chartered in 1941, it was one of eight active chapters.

The fraternity merged with Sigma Epsilon Theta, another Methodist fraternity, in 1941, to form Delta Sigma Theta. Due to the threat of a copyright lawsuit, Delta Sigma Theta would be renamed eight years later as Sigma Theta Epsilon, in 1949.

== Symbols ==
The name Phi Tau Theta was derived from the Greek words Philos Tau Theos or "Friends of God," The fraternity's publication was Philoi.

== Chapters ==
Following is a list of the former Phi Tau Theta chapters.

Chapter	Charter date and range	Institution	Location	Status	Ref.
Alpha	April 6, 1925 – 1942	Iowa State University	Ames, Iowa	Merged (ΣΘΕ)	(Note: Chapter formed from the Wesley Fellowship (local).) (Note: Became a chapter of Delta Sigma Theta, later called Sigma Theta Epsilon, with the national merger with Sigma Epsilon Theta, another Methodist fraternity.)
Beta	April 6, 1925 – 1942	University of Nebraska	Lincoln, Nebraska	Merged (ΣΘΕ)	(Note: Chapter formed from the Wesley Guild (local), established in 1922.)
Gamma	April 6, 1925 – 1942	University of South Dakota	Vermillion, South Dakota	Merged (ΣΘΕ)	(Note: Chapter formed from Phi Lambda Phi (local).)
Delta	April 6, 1925 – 1942	University of Minnesota	Minneapolis, Minnesota	Merged (ΣΘΕ)	(Note: Chapter formed from the Young Men’s Club (local).)
Epsilon	October 1927–1941	University of Iowa	Iowa City, Iowa	Inactive	
Zeta	1928–1931	University of California, Berkeley	Berkeley, California	Inactive	
Eta	November 16, 1929 – 1942	Iowa State Teachers College	Cedar Falls, Iowa	Merged (ΣΘΕ)	
Theta	May 16, 1931 – 1942	Ohio University	Athens, Ohio	Merged (ΣΘΕ)	(Note: Chapter formed from Mu Sigma Mu, a local fraternity for Methodist men.)
Iota	December 1931–1934	University of Wyoming	Laramie, Wyoming	Inactive	(Note: Chapter formed from the Wyoming Wesleyan local fraternity, established in 1930.)
Kappa	1934–1942	Ohio State University	Columbus, Ohio	Merged (ΣΘΕ)	
Lambda	May 21, 1937 – 1942	Kansas State University	Manhattan, Kansas	Merged (ΣΘΕ)	(Note: Chapter formed from the Methodist Young Men, a local club.)
Mu	1938–1942	West Virginia University	Morgantown, West Virginia	Merged (ΣΘΕ)	
Nu	May 5, 1940 – 1942	Oklahoma Agricultural and Mechanical College	Stillwataer, Oklahoma	Merged (ΣΘΕ)	

== See also ==
- Christian fraternity
