= Thomas Broughton =

Thomas Broughton may refer to:

- Thomas Broughton (writer) (1704–1774), English divine, biographer, and miscellaneous writer
- Thomas Broughton (divine) (1712–1777), English divine
- Thomas Duer Broughton (1778–1835), English writer on India
- Thomas Robert Shannon Broughton (1900–1993), Canadian classics scholar
- Thomas Broughton (governor) (1668–1737), lieutenant-governor of South Carolina from 1730 to 1737
- Thomas Broughton (Australian politician) (1810–1901), mayor of Sydney, Australia in 1847 and member of the Parliament of New South Wales in 1859–1860
- Sir Thomas Broughton, killed 16 June 1487 at the Battle of Stoke Field
- T. Alan Broughton (1936–2013), American poet and amateur pianist
