= STE =

STE, Ste, and Ste. may refer to:

== Transportation ==
- Stockton Terminal and Eastern Railroad
- Stevens Point Municipal Airport, IATA code STE
- Streatham railway station, London, National Rail station code STE
- Servicio de Transportes Eléctricos, a large public transit authority in Mexico City
- Special Touring Edition, a model of the Pontiac 6000 automobile

== Technology ==
- Secure Terminal Equipment
- Atari STE, an enhanced version of the Atari ST computer family
- STE-1, model number of the Shadow Telecine

== Other uses ==
- Simplified Technical English
- Sigma Theta Epsilon
- Saint, Ste., forms the French abbreviation for Sainte, the feminine form
- Star Trek: Enterprise, 2001–05 Star Trek TV series
- Ste, hypocorism of the given name Stephen or Steven
- Suite (address), abbreviated "Ste" or "STE"
- Solar thermal energy
- Save the Elephants
