= The Farmer's Return from London =

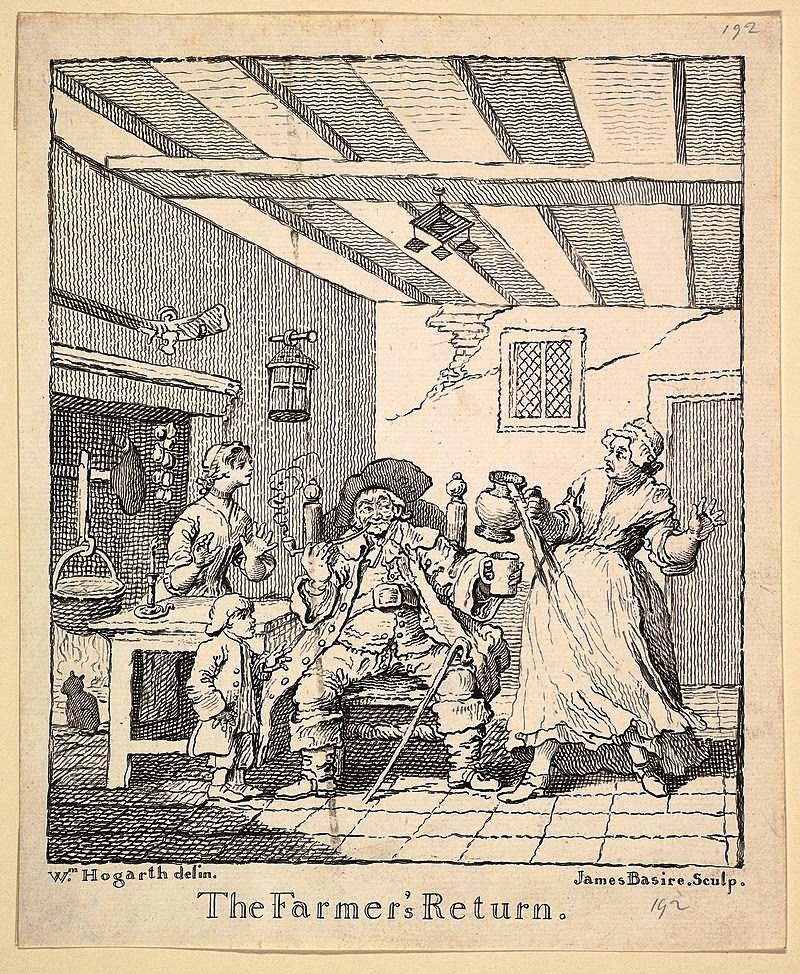
The Farmer's Return from London, a print after William Hogarth by James Basire the elder, London, 1762

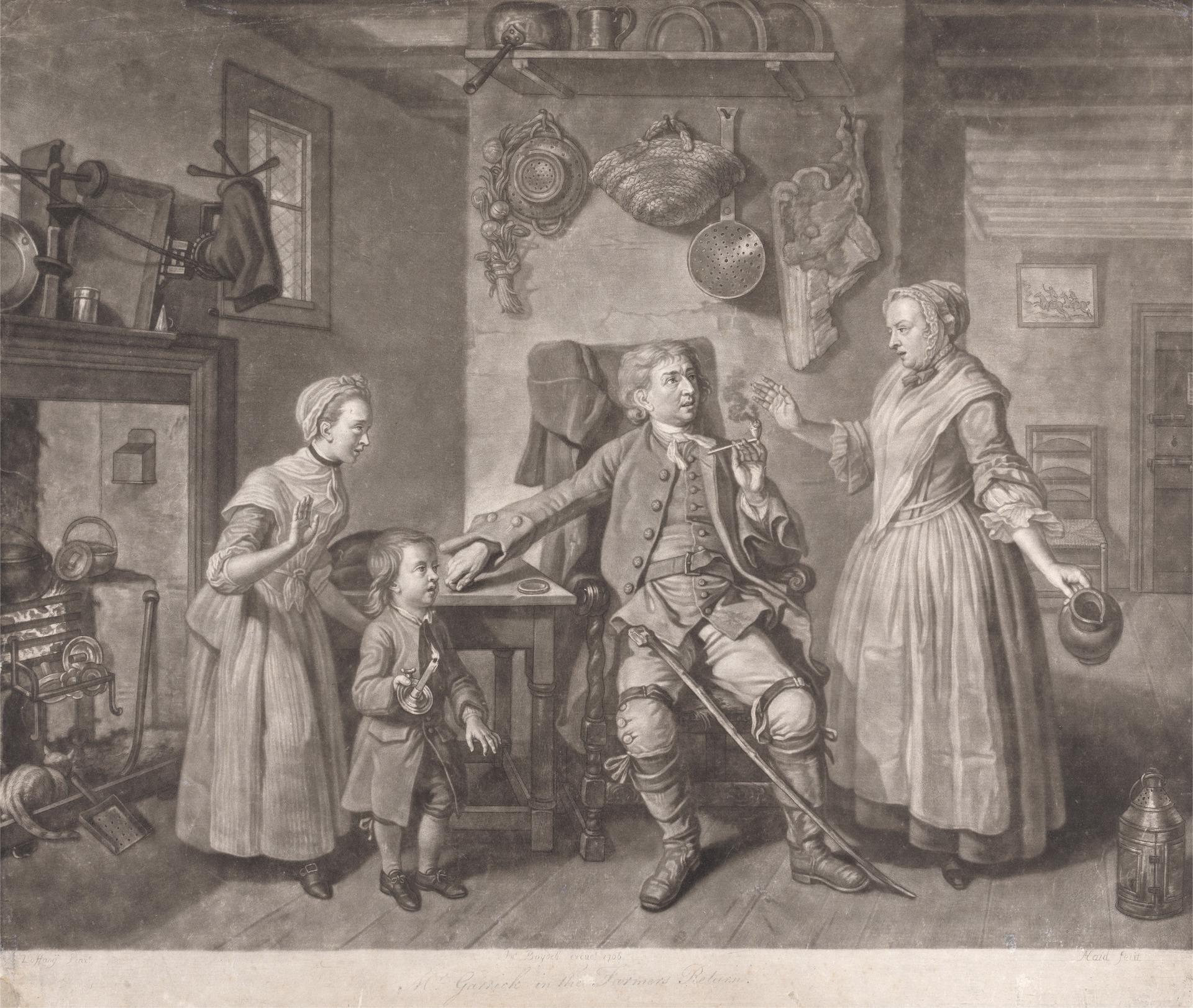
Johann Jacob Haid's print after Johan Zoffany of Garrick in The Farmer's Return from London

The Farmer's Return from London is a 94-line verse interlude written in 1762 by David Garrick. It was originally written for the charitable benefit of Hannah Pritchard and was first performed on 20 March 1762 at the Theatre Royal in Drury Lane. The performance featured Garrick as the farmer and Lucretia Bradshaw as his wife. The Farmer's Return from London was well received and performed several more times over the course of the theatrical season.

The interlude was sometimes included at the end of an evening's performance; on 25 January 1763 it followed The Two Gentlemen of Verona and preceded a comic dance called 'The Flemish Feast'. When the play was published later in 1762, Garrick's introductory note mentioned the occasion for which it was written and excused bringing the piece before the greater public because "his friend Mr Hogarth [had] flattered him most agreeably by thinking [the piece] not unworthy of a sketch of his pencil".

== Plot ==
The play concerns a farmer who has returned from the coronation of George III in London. Farmer John regales his family with stories of the sights of London, including the famous Cock Lane ghost fraud. The apparent ghost was known to answer questions by "scratching and knocking once for 'yes', twice for 'no'". The farmer then teases his wife by saying that the ghost knocked twice when he asked about her fidelity.

== Artistic depictions ==
William Hogarth’s drawing of the performance used to hang in the drawing room of Garrick's home and is now lost, although a print from it was made by James Basire and used as a frontispiece when the play was printed. The depiction of the farmer's relation of his visit to London was the first theatrical painting by Johan Zoffany, whose future patron Garrick became. Commissioned by Garrick and painted in May 1762, it served as the basis of a print by Johann Jacob Haid. In 2014, Zoffany's painting was allocated to the Bowes Museum in Barnard Castle in lieu of inheritance tax.

Though both depictions of the play look similar, in Hogarth's drawing the startled farmer’s wife is spilling ale from a jug at the climactic point in which the farmer mentions his visit to the ghost. Zoffany pictures her distress a few lines later on being told that the ghost had questioned her fidelity. But, the farmer reassures her next in his broad dialect, "Come prithee, no croying| The Ghoast, among Friends, was much giv’n to Loying."
