= Hammersmith Ghost murder case =

1804 English legal case

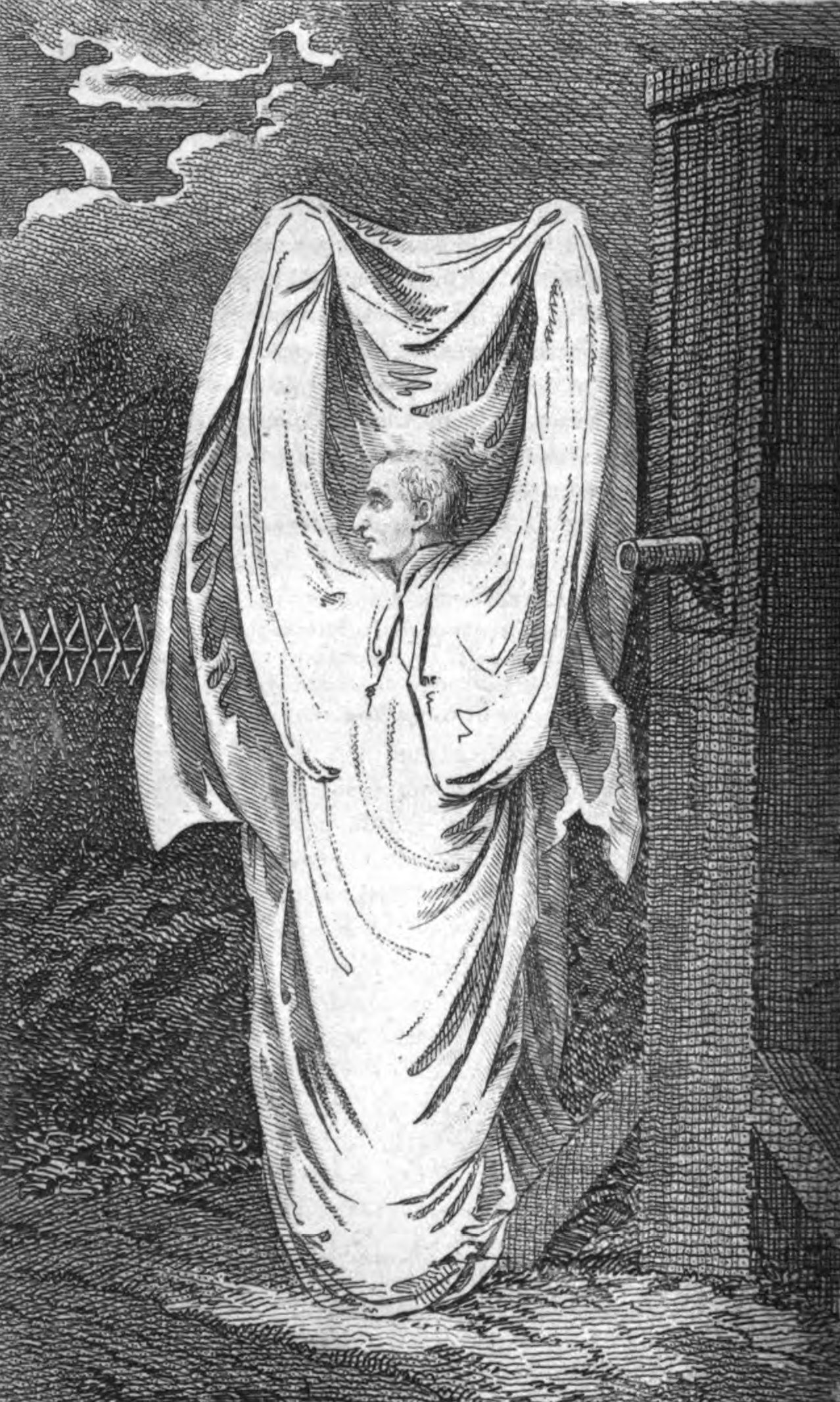
Engraving of the Hammersmith Ghost in Kirby's Wonderful and Scientific Museum, a magazine published in 1804

The Hammersmith Ghost murder case of 1804 set a legal precedent in the UK regarding self-defence: that someone could be held liable for their actions even if they were the consequence of a mistaken belief.

Near the end of 1803, many people claimed to have seen or even been attacked by a ghost in the Hammersmith area of London, a ghost believed by locals to be the spirit of a suicide victim. On January 3, 1804, a 29-year-old excise officer named Francis Smith, a member of one of the armed patrols set up in the wake of the reports, shot and killed a bricklayer, Thomas Millwood, mistaking the white clothes of Millwood's trade for the shroud of a ghostly apparition. Smith was found guilty of murder and sentenced to death, later commuted to one year's hard labour.

The issues surrounding the case were not settled for 180 years, until a Court of Appeal decision in 1984.

== Ghost ==
From November 1803, a number of people in the Hammersmith area claimed to have seen, and some to have been attacked by, a ghost. Local people said the ghost was of a man who had died by suicide the previous year and had been buried in Hammersmith churchyard. The contemporary belief was that suicide victims should not be buried in consecrated ground, as their souls would not then be at rest. The apparition was described as being very tall and dressed in all white, but was also said to wear a calfskin garment with horns and large glass eyes at other times.

Stories about the ghost soon began to circulate. Two women, one elderly and the other pregnant, were reported to have been seized by the ghost on separate occasions while walking near the churchyard; they were apparently so frightened they both died from shock a few days afterwards. A brewer's servant, Thomas Groom, later testified that, while walking through the churchyard with a companion one night, close to 9:00 pm, something rose from behind a tombstone and seized him by the throat. Hearing the scuffle, his companion turned around, at which the ghost "gave me a twist round, and I saw nothing; I gave a bit of a push out with my fist, and felt something soft, like a great coat."

On 29 December, William Girdler, a night watchman, saw the ghost while near Beavor Lane and gave chase; the apparition threw off its shroud and managed to escape. With London not having an organised police force at the time, and as "many people were very much frightened," according to Girdler, several citizens formed armed patrols in the hope of apprehending the ghost.

== Death of Thomas Millwood ==
At the corner of Beavor Lane, while making his rounds at around 10:30 pm on 3 January 1804, Girdler met one of the armed citizens patrolling the area, 29-year-old excise officer Francis Smith. Armed with a shotgun, Smith told Girdler he was going to look for the supposed ghost. Girdler agreed that he would join Smith after he had called the hour at 11:00 pm, and that they would "take [the ghost] if possible." They then went their separate ways.

Just after 11:00 pm, Smith encountered Thomas Millwood, a bricklayer who was wearing the normal white clothing of his trade: "linen trousers entirely white, washed very clean, a waistcoat of flannel, apparently new, very white, and an apron, which he wore round him". Millwood had been heading home from a visit to his parents and sister, who lived in Black Lion Lane. According to Anne Millwood, the bricklayer's sister, immediately after seeing her brother off, she heard Smith challenge him, saying "Damn you; who are you and what are you? Damn you, I'll shoot you." after which Smith shot him in the left of the lower jaw and killed him.

After hearing the shot, Girdler and Smith's neighbour, one John Locke, together with a George Stowe, met Smith, who "appeared very much agitated"; upon seeing Millwood's body, the others advised Smith to return home. Meanwhile, a constable arrived at the scene and took Smith into custody. Millwood's corpse was carried to an inn, where a surgeon, Mr. Flower, examined the body on 6 January and pronounced death to be the result of "a gunshot wound on the left side of the lower jaw with small shot, about size No. 4, one of which had penetrated the virtebre [sic] of the neck, and injured the spinal marrow."

== Trial of Francis Smith ==
Smith was tried for willful murder. The deceased's wife, Mrs. Fulbrooke, stated that she had warned him to cover his white clothing with a greatcoat, as he had already been mistaken for the ghost on a previous occasion.

On Saturday evening, he and I were at home, for he lived with me; he said he had frightened two ladies and a gentleman who were coming along the terrace in a carriage, for that the man said, he dared to say there goes the ghost; that he said he was no more a ghost than he was, and asked him, using a bad word, did he want a punch of the head; I begged of him to change his dress; Thomas, says I, as there is a piece of work about the ghost, and your cloaths [sic] look white, pray do put on your great coat, that you may not run any danger;

— Mrs. Fulbrooke's testimony at the Old Bailey trial

Millwood's sister testified that although Smith had called on her brother to stop or he would shoot, Smith fired the gun almost immediately. Despite a number of declarations of Smith's good character, the chief judge, Lord Chief Baron Sir Archibald Macdonald, advised the jury that malice was not required of murder – merely an intent to kill:

I should betray my duty, and injure the public security, if I did not persist in asserting that this is a clear case of murder, if the facts be proved to your satisfaction. All killing whatever amounts to murder, unless justified by the law, or in self-defence. In cases of some involuntary acts, or some sufficiently violent provocation, it becomes manslaughter. Not one of these circumstances occur here.

— Lord Chief Baron Macdonald

The Lord Chief Baron observed that Smith had neither acted in self-defence nor shot Millwood by accident; he had not been provoked by the supposed apparition nor had he attempted to apprehend it. Millwood had not committed any offence to justify being shot, and even if the supposed ghost had been shot, it would not have been acceptable, as frightening people while pretending to be a ghost was not a serious felony, but a far less serious misdemeanour, meriting only a small fine. The judge closed his remarks by reminding the jury that the previous good character of the accused meant nothing in this case. Macdonald directed the jury to find the accused guilty of murder if they believed the facts presented by the witnesses. After considering for an hour, the jury returned a verdict of manslaughter. Macdonald informed the jury that "the Court could not receive such a verdict", and that they must either find Smith guilty of murder, or acquit him; that Smith believed Millwood was a ghost was irrelevant. The jury then returned with a verdict of guilty. After passing the customary sentence of death, Macdonald said that he intended to report the case to the King, who had the power to commute the sentence. The initial sentence of hanging, drawing and quartering was commuted to a year's hard labour.

The huge publicity given to the case persuaded the true culprit to come forward: John Graham, an elderly shoemaker, had been pretending to be a ghost by using a white sheet to frighten his apprentice, who had been scaring Graham's children with ghost stories. There is no record of Graham ever being punished.

== Effect on UK law ==
The question of whether acting on a mistaken belief was a sufficient defence to a criminal charge was debated for more than a century until it was clarified at the Court of Appeal in the case R v Williams (Gladstone) (1984), concerning an appeal heard in November 1983. The appellant, Gladstone Williams, had seen a man dragging a younger man violently along the street while the latter shouted for help. Mistakenly believing that an assault was taking place, Williams intervened and injured the apparent assailant, who was actually attempting to apprehend a suspected thief. Williams was subsequently convicted of assault occasioning actual bodily harm. At the appeal, Lord Chief Justice Lane referred to the historical debate:

(the case) raised issues of law which have been the subject of debate for more years than one likes to think about and the subject of more learned academic articles than one would care to read in an evening.

— Lord Chief Justice Lane

Lane went on to clarify the problematic issue:

In a case of self-defence, where self-defence or the prevention of crime is concerned, if the jury came to the conclusion that the defendant believed, or may have believed, that he was being attacked or that a crime was being committed, and that force was necessary to protect himself or to prevent the crime, then the prosecution have not proved their case. If, however, the defendant's alleged belief was mistaken and if the mistake was an unreasonable one, that may be a peaceful reason for coming to the conclusion that the belief was not honestly held and should be rejected. Even if the jury come to the conclusion that the mistake was an unreasonable one, if the defendant may genuinely have been labouring under it, he is entitled to rely upon it.

— Lord Chief Justice Lane

The appeal was allowed, and the conviction quashed. The decision was approved by the Privy Council in Beckford v The Queen (1988) and was later written into law in the Criminal Justice and Immigration Act 2008, Section 76.

== See also ==
- Cock Lane ghost
- London Monster
- Spring-heeled Jack
