= James Hervey =

English clergyman and writer (1714–1758)

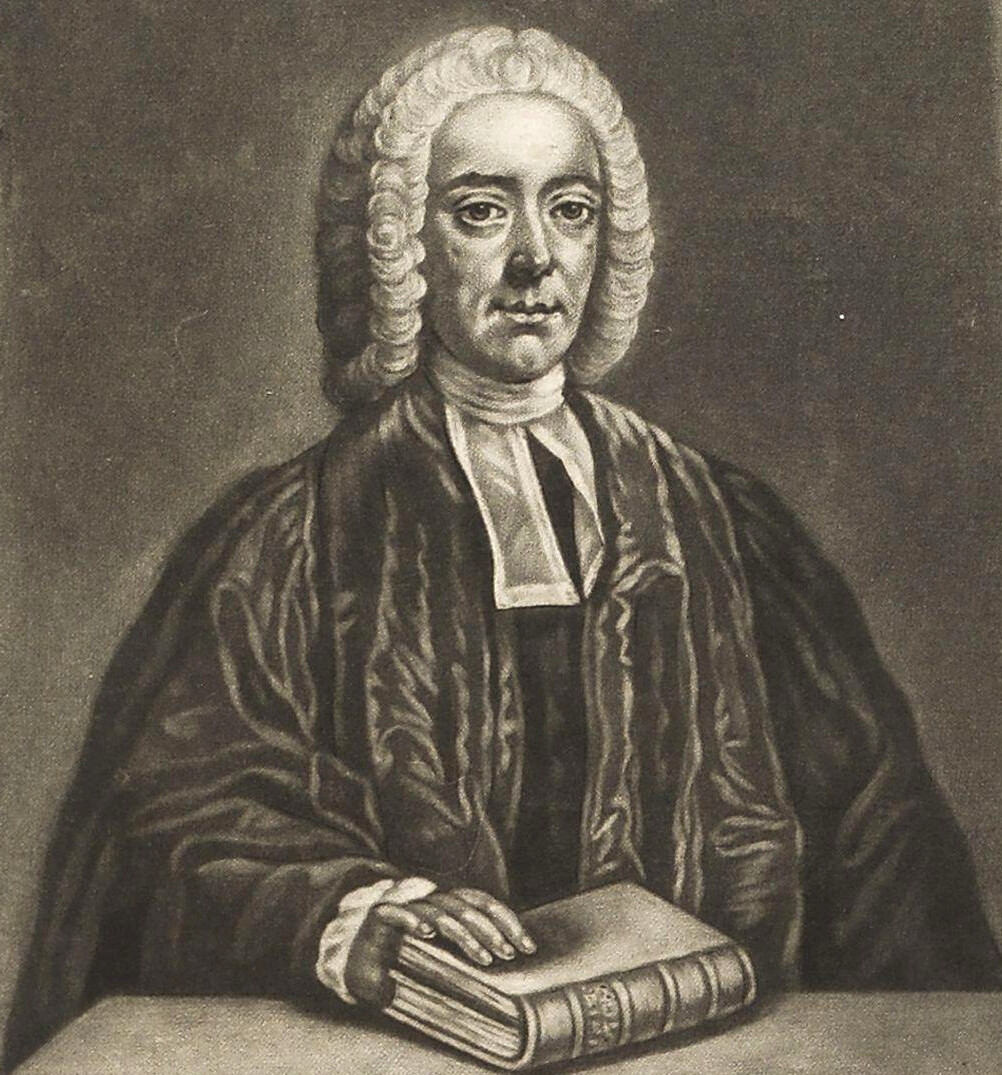
- Portrait of Hervey by Thomas Kitchin
- Born: 26 February 1714; Hardingstone, Northamptonshire
- Died: 25 December 1758 (aged 44); England
- Education: Lincoln College, Oxford
- Occupations: Clergyman, writer

James Hervey (26 February 1714 – 25 December 1758) was an English clergyman and writer.

== Life ==
James Hervey was born on 26 February 1714 at Hardingstone, Northamptonshire. He was educated at the Northampton School for Boys and Lincoln College, Oxford. Here he came under the influence of John Wesley and the Oxford Methodists, especially since he was a member of the Holy Club. Ultimately, however, while retaining his regard for the men and his sympathy with their religious aims, he adopted a thoroughly Calvinistic creed, and resolved to remain in the Anglican Church.

Having taken orders in 1737, he held several curacies, and in 1752 succeeded his father in the family livings of Weston Favell and Collingtree. He was never robust, but was a good parish priest and a zealous writer.

== Works ==
His style is often bombastic, but he displays a rare appreciation of natural beauty, and his simple piety made him many friends. His earliest work, Meditations and Contemplations, said to have been modelled on Robert Boyle's Occasional Reflexions on various Subjects, within fourteen years passed through as many editions.

Theron and Aspasio, or a series of Letters upon the most important and interesting Subjects, which appeared in 1755, and was equally well received, called forth some adverse criticism even from Calvinists, on account of tendencies which were considered to lead to antinomianism, and was strongly objected to by Wesley in his Preservative against unsettled Notions in Religion. Besides carrying into England the theological disputes to which the Marrow of Modern Divinity had given rise in Scotland (the Marrow controversy), it also led to what is known as the Sandemanian controversy as to the nature of saving faith.

A new and complete edition of his Works, with a memoir, appeared in 1797. See also Collection of the Letters of James Hervey, to which is prefixed an account of his Life and Death, by Thomas Birch (1760).

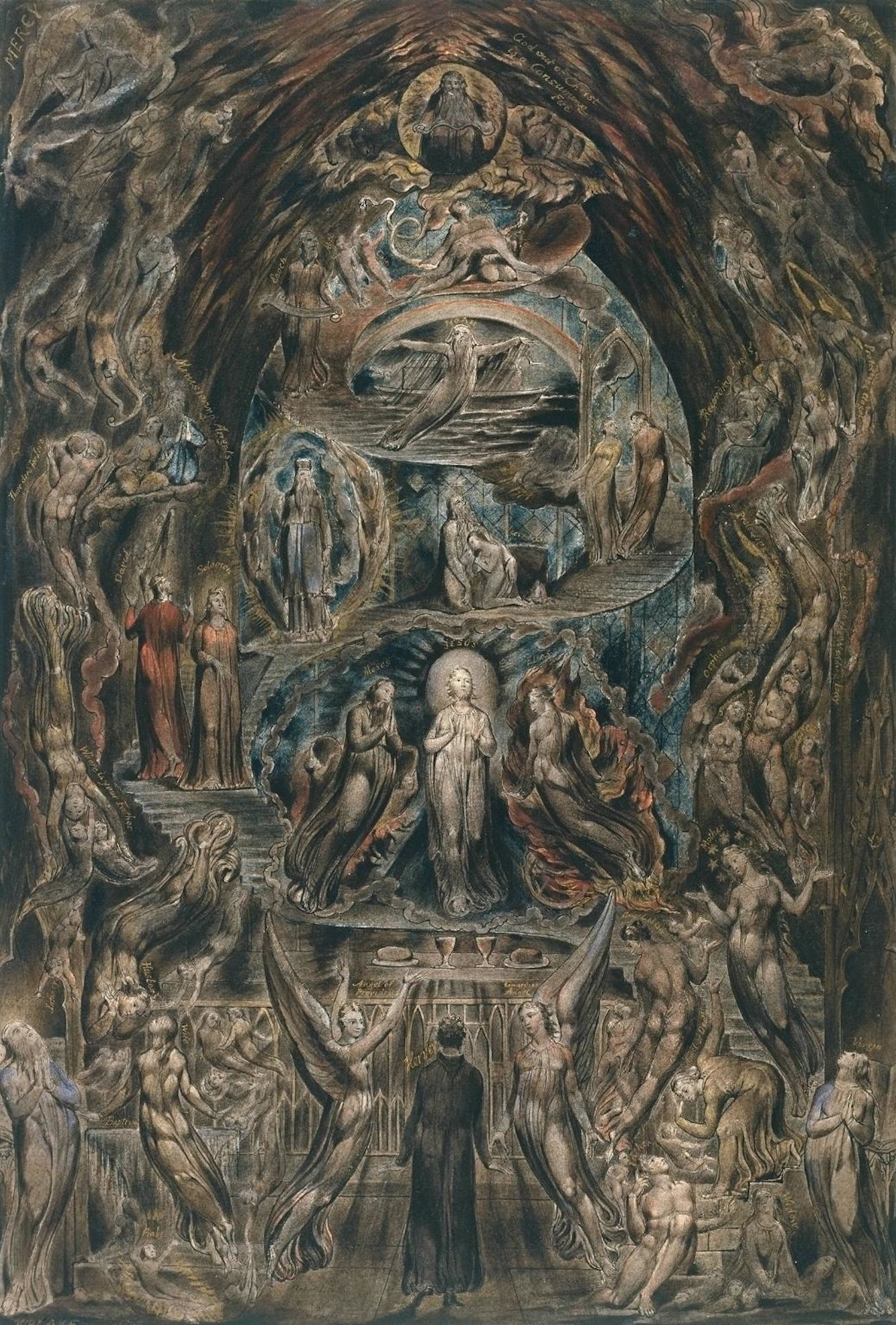
William Blake: Epitome of James Hervey's Meditations among the Tombs, 1820–1825 (Tate Britain)

== Influence ==
Hervey had a lasting impact on art through William Blake, who was an admirer of his. Blake painted Epitome of James Hervey's Meditations among the Tombs between 1820 and 1825. Hervey is also mentioned in Blake's work as one of the holy guards to the 'four-fold gate', and his influence on Blake's poem The Tyger has also been noted.

In addition to this, the sombre and sweeping tone of his Meditations Among The Tombs (for example, "the dreadful pleasure inspired by gazing at fallen monuments and mouldering tombs") has led to his being placed amongst the 18th century "Graveyard School" of poets, rendering his work an important influence on Horace Walpole's "The Castle of Otranto" of 1764 and consequently, the entire genre of Gothic literature and the later Romanticism which the genre fuelled.
