= Sigma Theta Epsilon =

American Christian fraternity (1925–2022)

- ΣΘΕ
- Founded: November 30, 1941; 84 years ago Cedar Falls, Iowa
- Type: Christian
- Affiliation: Independent
- Status: Defunct
- Defunct date: November 19, 2022
- Scope: National
- Motto: Συνεργοι Θεου Εσμεν, Sunergoi Theou Esman, 'Fellow Workers with God'
- Colors: Purple, Old Gold, and White
- Chapters: 47
- Headquarters: , Ohio; United States

Sigma Theta Epsilon (ΣΘΕ) was an American interdenominational national Christian fraternal organization that operated from 1941 to 2022. It had 47 chapters across the United States.

== History ==
=== Predecessors ===
Methodist students at the University of South Dakota in Vermillion, South Dakota, formed a local a religious fraternity, Phi Lambda Phi, around 1924. They invited representatives from similar organizations at other colleges to meeting in Lincoln, Nebraska on February 6–7, 1925, to discuss forming a national fraternity. At that meeting, the delegates drew up articles of federation and elected national officers, establishing a national religious fraternity for Methodist men known as Phi Tau Theta.

On October 8, 1936, Methodist students at Indiana University established Sigma Epsilon Theta. Edwin Green, a student pastor at the Wesley Foundation was its first president. Other founding members included Edward Dodd, Montford Mead, F. Jay Nimitz, and Robert E. Schalliol. Sigma Epsilon Theta became a regional fraternity with three chapters.

=== Formation ===
In 1939, Phi Tau Theta approached Sigma Epsilon Theta about merging. On November 30, 1941, at a meeting in Cedar Falls, Iowa held during Thanksgiving break 1941, the two fraternities merged into Delta Sigma Theta. It had the common mission as a fraternity for Methodist men. However, a national sorority with prior usage of the Delta Sigma Theta name, threatened suit against the new fraternity. The fraternity's members selected the new name, Sigma Theta Epsilon, during Easter break 1949.

The purpose of Sigma Theta Epsilon was four-fold:

1. "To extend our service projects through programs of action to meet unfilled human needs.
2. To attempt with the guidance of God to live Christian lives of faith and service.
3. To provide social activities through service and Brotherhood.
4. To provide a background for understanding ourselves, our faith, and our world."

Its officers include president, vice president, recording secretary, corresponding secretary, treasurer, chaplain, historian, and alumni secretary.

After a period of expansion, the many chapters became inactive, leading to the 1968 national conclave to appoint a committee to review the fraternity's mission. The committee suggested changing the emphasis on Methodist men to Christian men. However, this change increased the loss of members because of less support from campus the Wesley Foundations. In 1972, the fraternity changed purpose to be religious, service, and social; however, this was reversed in 1975.

In 1975, Alpha Gamma at West Virginia Wesleyan College and the Epsilon at Ohio Northern University were the only active chapters. The addition of a chapter at Mount Union College in April 1980 stimulated optimism for the fraternity. However, by 1988 Delta chapter nearly closed and Alpha Gamma's membership was declining. That year, Beta Alpha chapter formed in Oklahoma City University. The Beta Alpha designation marked what was hoped to be a rebirth for the fraternity, and all chapters from this point on would be named in succession following Beta Alpha.

In March 1993, the Beta Beta chapter at Miami University of Ohio was formed. In the fall of 1993, Delta chapter at University of Mount Union was reviving from nearly closing and initiated its first pledge class in almost five years. In 1998, the Beta Gamma chapter was installed at the University of Cincinnati. The Beta Delta chapter was formed in 1999 at Our Lady of the Lake University. Beta Epsilon chapter from Bradley University was chartered in 2000. This was followed by Beta Zeta chapter at Oklahoma City University in 2002 and Beta Eta chapter at West Virginia University and Beta Theta at Ohio University in 2003. The addition of the Beta Kappa chapter in 2006 brought the number of active chapters to eleven, the highest number seen since the 1960s.

However, growth ceased, and in August 2022 there was only one active chapter, Our Lady of the Lake University. On November 19, 2022, Sigma Theta Epsilon officially closed. There are no remaining active chapters and all fraternal operations have ceased.

== Symbols ==
The Greek letters Sigma Theta Epsilon were selected to represent the Ancient Greek: Συνεργοι Θεου Εσμεν, romanized: Sunergoi Theou Esman, lit. 'Fellow Workers with God'. This is taken from I Corinthians 3:9 and was also the group's motto. The fraternity's insignia included badge, pledge pin, recognition pin, and alumni key. The fraternity's colors were purple, old gold, and white. Its flag consisted of vertical stripes of purple, white, and gold with the Greek letters "ΣΘΕ" and the fraternity's crest in the middle stripe.

== Chapters ==
Chapters of Sigma Theta Epsilon included the following, with inactive chapters and institutions noted in italics. A state naming system was adopted briefly when there were few chapters still active.

Chapter	Charter date and range	Institution	Location	Status	Ref.
Alpha	November 30, 1941 – 1967	Iowa State University	Ames, Iowa	Inactive	(Note: Formed from the Alpha chapter of Phi Tau Theta, established in 1925.)
Beta	November 30, 1941 – 1965	University of Nebraska	Lincoln, Nebraska	Inactive	(Note: Formed from the Beta chapter of Phi Tau Theta, established in 1925.)
Gamma	November 30, 1941 – 1960	University of South Dakota	Vermillion, South Dakota	Inactive	(Note: Formed from the Gamma chapter of Phi Tau Theta, established in 1925.)
Delta (1)	November 30, 1941 – 1951	University of Minnesota	Minneapolis and Saint Paul, Minnesota	Inactive, Reassigned	(Note: Chapter formed from the Delta chapter of Phi Tau Theta, established in 1925.)
Epsilon (see Iota 2)	November 30, 1941 – 1941	University of Iowa	Iowa City, Iowa	Inactive	(Note: Chapter formed from the Epsilon chapter of Phi Tau Theta, established in 1927.)
Zeta	November 30, 1941 – 1931	University of California, Berkeley	Berkeley, California	Inactive	(Note: Chapter formed from the Zeta chapter of Phi Tau Theta, established in 1928.)
Eta	November 30, 1941 – 1962; 1966–1971	University of Northern Iowa	Cedar Falls, Iowa	Inactive	(Note: Chapter formed from the Eta chapter of Phi Tau Theta, established in 1929.)
Theta (see Beta Theta)	November 30, 1941 – 1943; 1945–1972	Ohio University	Athens, Ohio	Inactive	(Note: Chapter formed from the Theta chapter of Phi Tau Theta, established in 1931.)
Iota	November 30, 1941 – c. 1934	University of Wyoming	Laramie, Wyoming	Inactive	(Note: Chapter formed from the Iota chapter of Phi Tau Theta, established in 1931.)
Kappa	November 30, 1941 – 1968	Ohio State University	Columbus, Ohio	Inactive	(Note: Chapter formed from the Kappa chapter of Phi Tau Theta, established in 1934.)
Lambda	November 30, 1941 – 1943; 1952–1965	Kansas State University	Manhattan, Kansas	Inactive	(Note: Chapter formed from the Lambda chapter of Phi Tau Theta, established in 1937.)
Mu (see Beta Eta)	November 30, 1941 – 1970	West Virginia University	Morgantown, West Virginia	Inactive	(Note: Chapter formed from the Mu chapter of Phi Tau Theta, established in 1938.)
Nu	November 30, 1941 – 1971	Oklahoma State University	Stillwater, Oklahoma	Inactive	(Note: Chapter formed from the Nu chapter of Phi Tau Theta, established in 1940.)
Xi	November 30, 1941 – 1957	Indiana University	Bloomington, Indiana	Inactive	(Note: Formed from a chapter of Sigma Epsilon Theta, established in 1936.)
Omicron (see Beta Beta)	November 30, 1941 – 1962	Miami University	Oxford, Ohio	Inactive	(Note: Formed from a chapter of Sigma Epsilon Theta, established in 1937.)
Pi	November 30, 1941 – 1942; 1952–1958; 1960–1962	Bowling Green State University	Bowling Green, Ohio	Inactive	
Rho	1948–1959	Fort Hays State University	Hays, Kansas	Inactive	
Sigma	1948–1971	Kent State University	Kent, Ohio	Inactive	
Tau	1949–1968	University of Oklahoma	Norman, Oklahoma	Inactive	
Upsilon	1950–1953	University of Nebraska at Kearney	Kearney, Nebraska	Inactive	
Phi	1950–1953	University of Michigan	Ann Arbor, Michigan	Inactive	
Epsilon (2) (see Beta Alpha)	1950–1954	Oklahoma City University	Oklahoma City, Oklahoma	Inactive	
Zeta (2)	1952–1954	University of Wisconsin–Stevens Point	Stevens Point, Wisconsin	Inactive	
Chi	1952–1953; 1960–1968	Pittsburg State University	Pittsburg, Kansas	Inactive	
Iota (2) (see Epsilon)	1954–1960	University of Iowa	Iowa City, Iowa	Inactive	
Psi	1955–1957	Southwestern Oklahoma State University	Weatherford, Oklahoma	Inactive	
Omega				Memorial	
Alpha Alpha	1956–1962	Michigan State University	East Lansing, Michigan	Inactive	
Alpha Beta	1956–1974	Western Michigan University	Kalamazoo, Michigan	Inactive	
Alpha Gamma	February 23, 1957 – 2012	West Virginia Wesleyan College	Buckhannon, West Virginia	Inactive	
Alpha Delta	1958–1965; 1967–1970	Pennsylvania State University	State College, Pennsylvania	Inactive	
Alpha Epsilon	1960–1969	American University	Washington, D.C.	Inactive	
Alpha Zeta	1961–1963; 1966–1971	Central Michigan University	Mount Pleasant, Michigan	Inactive	
Gamma (2)	1967–1971	Mansfield University of Pennsylvania	Mansfield, Pennsylvania	Inactive	
Beta (2)	1974–1975	Lane College	Jackson, Tennessee	Inactive	
Epsilon (2) (Alpha of Ohio)	March 23, 1975 – 2021	Ohio Northern University	Ada, Ohio	Inactive	(Note: Chapter was called both Epsilon (2) and Alpha of Ohio.)
Eta (2)	1976–1977	Northern Illinois University	DeKalb, Illinois	Inactive	
Delta (2)	1969–1975; April 27, 1980 – 1987; 1994-2011	University of Mount Union	Alliance, Ohio	Inactive	
Beta Alpha (see Epsilon 2)	1988–2003	Oklahoma City University	Oklahoma City, Oklahoma	Inactive	
Beta Beta (see Omicron)	March 26, 1993 – 2008	Miami University	Oxford, Ohio	Inactive	
Beta Gamma	January 31, 1998 – 2011	University of Cincinnati	Cincinnati, Ohio	Inactive	
Beta Delta (Alpha of Texas)	March 6, 1999 – November 19, 2022	Our Lady of the Lake University	San Antonio, Texas	Inactive	(Note: Chapter was originally named the Beta Delta chapter, but was renamed Alpha of Texas.)
Beta Epsilon	October 21, 2000 – 2012	Bradley University	Peoria, Illinois	Inactive	
Beta Zeta	October 26, 2002 – 2015	Northeastern State University	Tahlequah, Oklahoma	Inactive	
Beta Eta (see Mu)	April 5, 2003 – 2011	West Virginia University	Morgantown, West Virginia	Inactive	
Beta Theta (see Theta)	November 22, 2003 – 2006; 2009–2010	Ohio University	Athens, Ohio	Inactive	
Beta Iota	April 9, 2004 – 2006	Illinois Wesleyan University	Bloomington, Illinois	Inactive	
Beta Kappa	2006–2007	Missouri Valley College	Marshall, Missouri	Inactive	
