= Credulity, Superstition, and Fanaticism =

Satirical print by William Hogarth

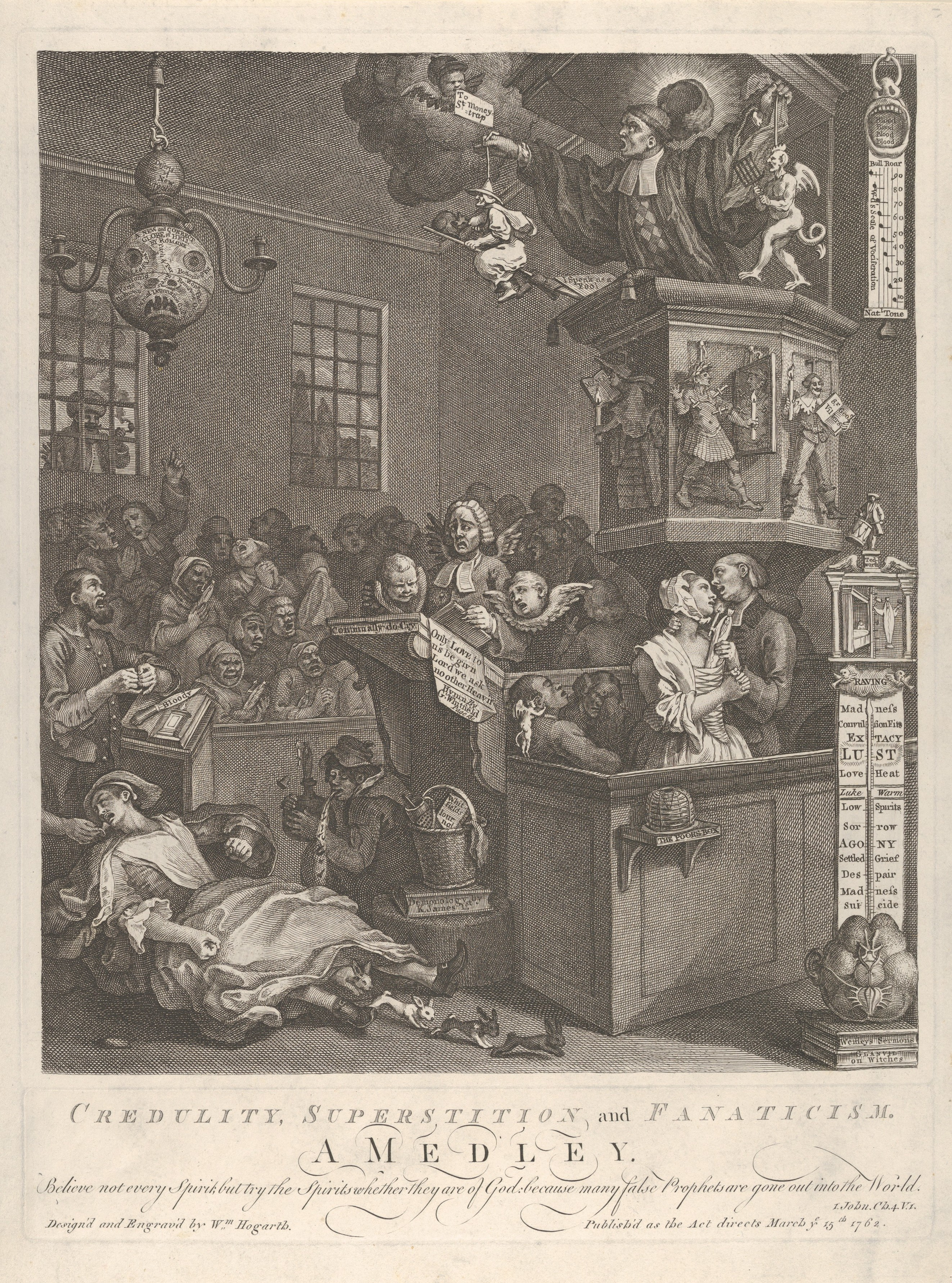
- Artist: William Hogarth
- Year: 1762

Credulity, Superstition and Fanaticism is a satirical print by the English artist William Hogarth. It ridicules secular and religious credulity, and lampoons the exaggerated religious "enthusiasm" (excessive emotion, not keenness) of the Methodist movement. The print was originally engraved in 1761, with the title Enthusiasm Delineated, but never published.

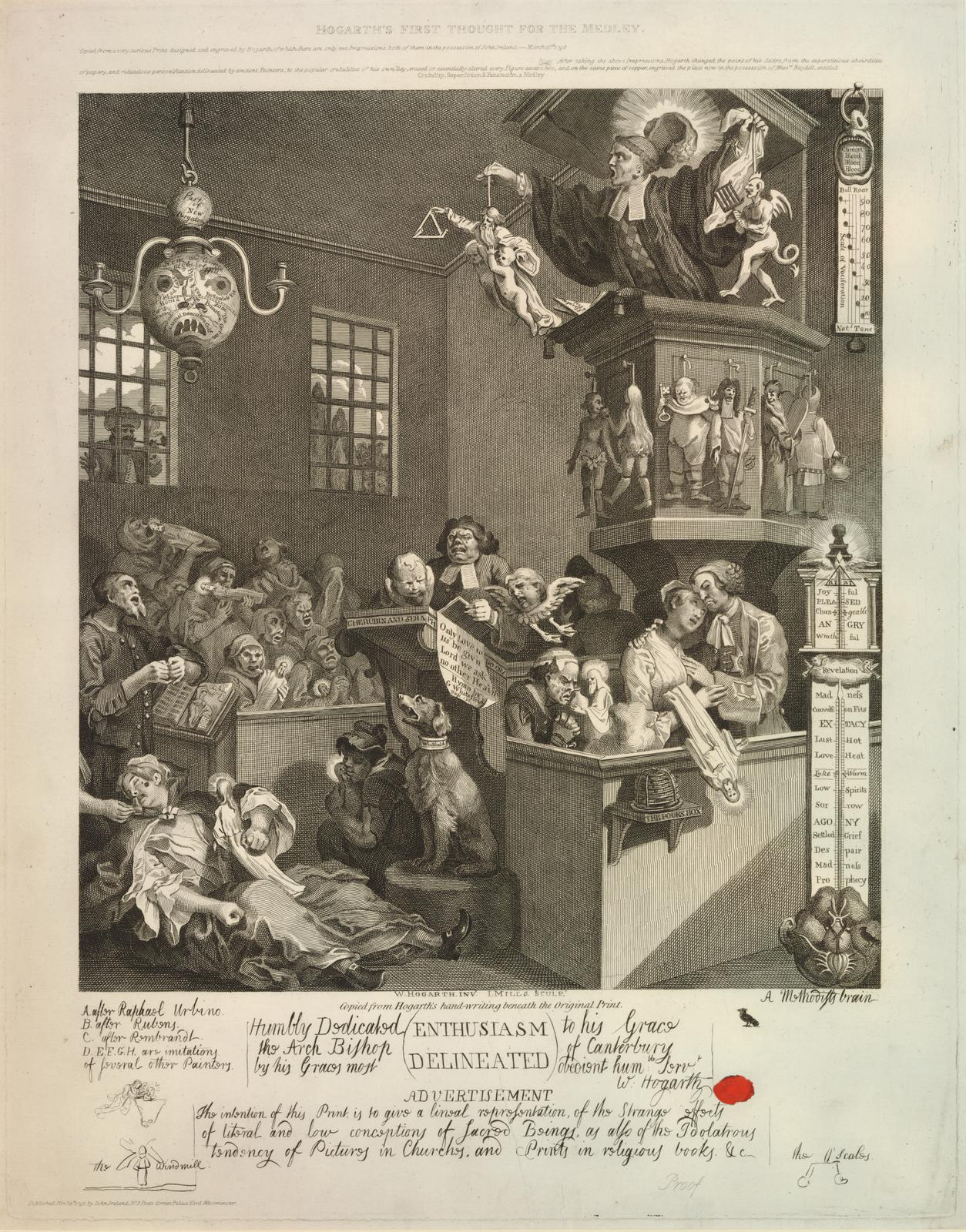
Isaac Mills's 1795 recreation of Enthusiasm Delineated, based on Hogarth's earlier work

The original print may have been a response to three essays published by Joshua Reynolds in The Idler in 1759, praising the sublime work of Italian Counter-Reformation artists. It certainly satirized both the English connoisseurs' enthusiasm for old masters and Roger de Piles's Balance de peintres, which was much discussed among art critics in the eighteenth century. However, Hogarth reworked the engraving before publishing it on 15 March 1762 as Credulity, Superstition and Fanaticism: A Medley, now laying more stress on Methodist fanaticism and echoing his earlier print, The Sleeping Congregation of 1736, in which an Anglican clergyman's boring sermon puts his congregation to sleep.

== Interpretation ==
=== The preacher ===
The print depicts a preacher – his open mouth and scale of vociferation an allusion to George Whitefield's powerful voice – speaking to a church congregation from the top of a high pulpit. His text is opened at a page which reads "I speak as a fool", and he is wearing a Harlequin jacket under his clerical gown. He is holding a puppet of a devil with a gridiron in his left hand and a puppet of a witch suckling an incubus in his right hand. His wig is falling off to reveal a Jesuit's tonsure underneath. To the right, the "scale of vociferation" measures his oratory, rising from "natural tone" to "bull roar". (In Enthusiasm Delineated, the puppet of the witch was a figure representing God (after a painting by Raphael), and the sides of the pulpit are adorned with additional pairs of religious puppets which are omitted in its final version.)

=== Superstition ===
The print includes visual references to more than a dozen reputed instances of witchcraft or possession in England. The three figures decorating the pulpit each hold a candle, and allude to the ghost seen by Sir George Villiers (whose name appears in a book held by the figure on the right), the ghost of the stabbed Julius Caesar appearing before Brutus, and the ghost of Mrs Veale (immortalised by Daniel Defoe in A True Relation of the Apparition of One Mrs. Veal the Next Day after her Death to One Mrs. Bargrave at Canterbury 8 September 1705).

In a box pew at the foot of the pulpit, another clergyman pushes an icon of the Cock Lane ghost down the shirt of a young lady in the throes of religious ecstasy (in Enthusiasm Delineated, this was an aristocratic rake fondling the breast of a woman); to the left of this couple a devil whispers into the ear of a sleeping man. The "Poors Box" is a mousetrap alluding to the accusation that Whitefield collected large sums of money during the collections following his sermons in order to appropriate them for himself. To the right, standing on copies of Wesley's Sermons, and Glanvill's Book of Witches, a religious thermometer measures the emotional states of a brain (borrowed from one of Christopher Wren's anatomical illustrations) from a central reading of lukewarm, either upwards through love heat, to lust, ecstasy, madness and raving, or downwards through low spirits to sorrow, agony, settled grief to despair, then madness and suicide. On top of the thermometer is an image of the Cock Lane ghost, and the Drummer of Tedworth.

The congregation are in various states of ecstasy, grief and horror. Another minister (most likely a representation of the squint-eyed George Whitefield) sings with a pained expression a Methodist hymn, accompanied by weeping cherubs. A shoeblack vomits nails and pins – according to John Ireland possibly a reference to the boy of Bilson, who ate metal items and spat them out to be considered bewitched. However, the figure looks more like an adult woman. Next to this figure a woman lies on the floor with rabbits running from under her skirt – this must be Mary Toft, a woman from Godalming, who in 1726 was supposed to have given birth to a litter of rabbits. A Jew with a knife sacrifices an insect on the altar. A turbaned Turk looks in at the window, quietly smoking a pipe, and thanks the prophet that he is a Muslim. He represents the "rational, enlightened part of mankind looking down on Christian fanatics with surprise and disgust."

Above the congregation is suspended a "A New and Correct Globe of Hell by Romaine" (possibly referring to William Romaine), with parts labelled "Molten Lead Lake", "Pitch & Tar Rivers", "Horrid Zone", "The Brimstone Ocean", and "Eternal Damnation Gulf". One man below the globe is terrified when a preacher next to him (possibly John Wesley) points it out to him.

Beneath the engraving Hogarth quotes 1 John 4:1, "Believe not every Spirit, but try the Spirits whether they are of God: because many false Prophets are gone out into the World."

== Reception ==
Art historian Horace Walpole praised Hogarth, stating that this print "surpassed all his other performances" and "would alone immortalize his unequalled talents."

== See also ==
- List of works by William Hogarth
