= Holy Club =

Group at the University of Oxford in 1729

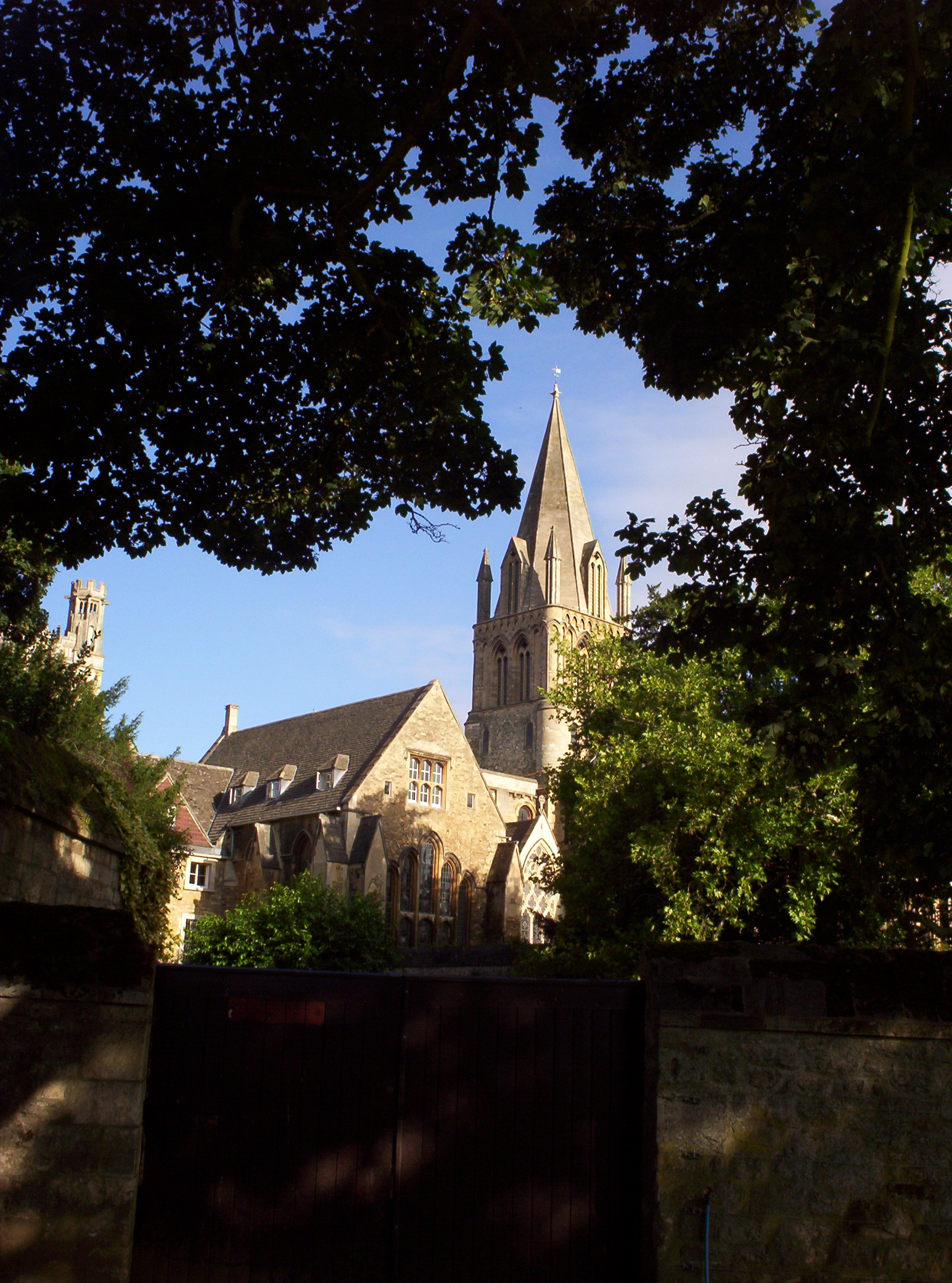
The club met at Christ Church at the University of Oxford.

The Holy Club was an organization at Christ Church, Oxford, formed in 1729 by brothers John and Charles Wesley, who later founded Methodism. The brothers and associates, including George Whitefield, met for prayer, Bible study, and pious discipline.

== History ==
The "Holy Club" started in November 1729 when John Wesley went to live at the University of Oxford. When he came to reside there, three of his friends along with himself agreed to spend three or four evenings together, every week. Their intention was to "read over" (skim through and discuss) the classics together, which they had already read before privately and to read a book about divinity on Sundays. Charles Wesley, John's brother, was one of the four individuals making up this small cell group.

The actual title of "The Holy Club" was not a name which any of the members came up with, but rather was a title bestowed upon them (most likely as an insult by those trying to mock them).

As many of the Holy Club's members went on to lead the Evangelical Revival within the Church of England, this organisation is often said to be the root of Methodism.

== Practice ==
Jeering college students scoffed at these "Methodists" who tried to systematically serve God every hour of the day. The club members set aside time for praying, examining their spiritual lives, studying the Bible, and meeting together. In addition, they took food to poor families, visited lonely people in prison, and taught orphans how to read. Members of the organization celebrated Holy Communion frequently and fasted on Wednesdays and Fridays until 3 pm. Fellows of the Holy Club also studied and discussed the Greek New Testament as well as the Classics.

== Opposition ==
University wits styled them the "Holy Club" or "Methodists", a title of derision. They were dismissed as "enthusiasts" (indicating excessive religious behaviour, or fanaticism). Critics of the Holy Club recited a popular ditty:

By rule they eat, by rule they drink,
By rule do all things but think.
Accuse the priests of loose behaviour.
To get more in the laymen's favour.
Method alone must guide 'em all
When themselves "Methodists" they call.

Currents of opposition became a furor following the mental breakdown and death of a group member, William Morgan. In response to the charge that "rigorous fasting" had hastened his death, Wesley noted that Morgan had left off fasting a year and a half since. In the same letter, which was widely circulated, Wesley referred to the name "Methodist" which "some of our neighbors are pleased to compliment us." That name was used by an anonymous author in a published pamphlet (1733) describing Wesley and his group, "The Oxford Methodists".

== Notable members ==
The individuals listed below are notable members of the Holy Club who distinguished themselves later in life.

- John Wesley – founder of the Methodist Church
- Charles Wesley – famous hymn writer and brother of John Wesley.
- John Gambold – bishop of the Moravian Church
- John Clayton – distinguished Anglican churchman
- James Hervey – noted religious writer
- Benjamin Ingham – famous evangelist in Yorkshire
- Thomas Broughton – secretary of the Society for Promoting Christian Knowledge
- George Whitefield – famous clergyman associated both with the First Great Awakening in the United States and the evangelical revival in England

== See also ==
- Erasmus of Arcadia
- Oxford Inter-Collegiate Christian Union
