= Wesley Foundation =

United Methodist campus ministry

A Wesley Foundation is a United Methodist campus ministry sponsored in full or in part (depending on the congregation) by the United Methodist Church on a non-church owned and operated campus. Wesley Foundations claim ancestry in the founding "Holy Club" of the Methodist movement, a group of students at Oxford University guided by Wesley in "methodical" (hence "Methodist") study, prayer, and self-discipline. Today a Wesley Foundation is the presence of the United Methodist Church on or near, and in service to, a state-run, non-church affiliated college or university (Church-related schools have Chaplains that may guide similar groups).

The first Wesley Foundation was established on October 13, 1913 at the University of Illinois. Bishop James C. Baker's work in organizing this first Wesley Foundation chose the name Wesley Foundation to emphasize two spheres of outreach. Wesley refers to John Wesley the founder of the Methodist Church and first campus minister at Oxford University, while Foundation was selected to mean an "open movement", an ecumenical movement available to all college students.

Wesley Foundations are primarily found in the United States, Canada and the United Kingdom, but can also be found in a number of other countries around the world. They are governed by the basic unit of the United Methodist Church, the annual conference; ordained ministers are appointed by their annual conference or lay ministers are hired to serve Wesley Foundations as campus minister. Ordained ministers serve in similar manner to their usual appointment to a church or charge.
