= The Bottle Conjuror =

Stage name of a hoax

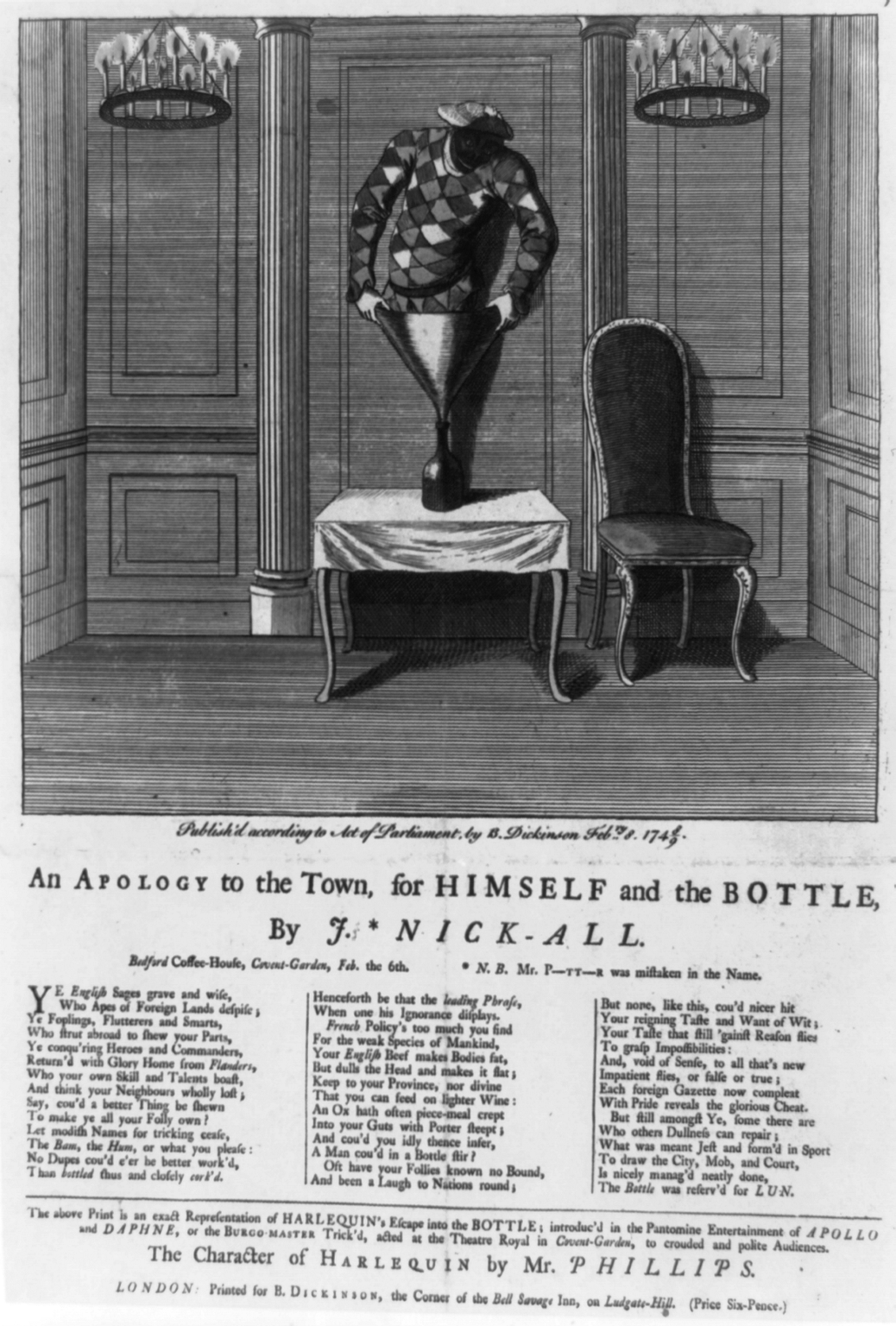
Image of William Phillips as Harlequin in a representation of the Bottle Conjuror, English broadside dated 1748/9

The Bottle Conjuror was the stage name given to a hoax theatrical performer, advertised to appear at the Haymarket Theatre in England, on 16 January 1749. While on stage, the acrobat was to have placed his body inside an empty wine bottle, in full view of the audience. When he failed to appear for the widely-billed performance, the audience rioted and gutted the theatre.

== History ==
=== Background ===
At the New Theatre in the Hay-market, on Monday next, the 16th instant, to be seen, a person who performs the several most surprising things following, viz. first, he takes a common walking-cane from any of the spectators, and thereon plays the music of every instrument now in use, and likewise sings to surprising perfection. Secondly, he presents you with a common wine bottle, which any of the spectators may first examine; this bottle is placed on a table in the middle of the stage, and he (without any equivocation) goes into it in sight of all the spectators, and sings in it; during his stay in the bottle any person may handle it, and see plainly that it does not exceed a common tavern bottle.
Those on the stage or in the boxes may come in masked habits (if agreeable to them); and the performer (if desired) will inform them who they are.

— Newspaper advertisement, January 1749

Although the identity of the hoax's perpetrator is unknown, several authors consider John Montagu, 2nd Duke of Montagu, to have been responsible. While in the company of other noblemen, the Duke was reported to have made a bet that, with an advertisement claiming that a man could "creep into a quart bottle", he could fill a theatre. The event was advertised in several London newspapers and was soon the talk of the town.

=== Performance ===
In front of a huge audience, which included the king's second son, the Duke of Cumberland, the theatre lights were brought up at about 7 pm. With no music to keep them entertained, the crowd grew restless and began to voice their discontent. A theatre employee appeared from behind the curtain and told the audience that, if the performer did not appear, their money would be refunded. One member of the audience reportedly shouted that if the audience paid double, the conjurer would fit himself into a pint bottle.

As the crowd grew more restless, someone threw a lighted candle onto the stage. Most of the audience—including the Duke—took this as their cue to leave, some "losing a cloak, others a hat, others a wig, and swords also". A group of angry spectators stayed inside and gutted the theatre. Benches were ripped up, scenery was destroyed and boxes were demolished. Debris was dragged into the street and burnt on a bonfire.

=== Aftermath ===
Suspicion immediately fell upon the theatre's manager, Samuel Foote, for having originated the hoax. Foote claimed he knew nothing about the performance, but that he had warned the theatre's owner, John Potter, that he suspected something was not quite correct. Potter himself fell under suspicion, but was apparently innocent, "a strange man" having dealt with all the arrangements that night.

The "Man in the Bottle" instantly became the target of the newspapers and pamphlets, who published cutting satires about the conjurer's non-appearance, and its consequences. Many satirical prints were produced, among them two caricatures published within the month: The Bottle-Conjuror from Head to Foot, without equivocation, and English Credulity; or ye're all bottled. One newspaper explained the non-appearance of the conjurer by claiming that he had been ready to perform on the night, but was asked for a private audience beforehand; whereupon receiving a demonstration of the trick, the viewer had "corked up the bottle, whipped it in his pocket and made off."

The story soon spread throughout Europe and became a constant joke about the gullibility of the English nation. This was a particular affront in the Age of Enlightenment. The Great Bottle Conjuror Hoax of 1749 has gone down in history as one of the great pranks.

The critic Barbara Benedict wrote in 2001 that the Bottle Conjurer ″promised to bring literature to life; to reverse power relations; to incarnate onanism; to make monstrosity—the transgression of physical boundaries—humorous. Instead, he made the audience fools of their own desire. When balked, furthermore, this unleashed desire turned violent.″
