= Thomas Broughton (divine) =

English divine

Thomas Broughton (1712–1777) was an English divine.

== Life ==
Broughton, the son of another Thomas Broughton, said to have been at one time commissioner of excise at Edinburgh, was born in Oxford. When he matriculated at University College, Oxford, on 13 December 1731, his father was described as of "Carfax in Oxford". He was elected Petreian fellow at Exeter College on 30 June 1733, and became full fellow on 14 July 1734, taking his degree of B.A. on 22 March 1737. Soon after becoming an undergraduate he joined the little band of young men known as 'Methodists', and remained a sympathiser with the Wesleys for several years, until differences of opinion on the Moravian doctrines led to their separation.

Broughton's first clerical duty was at Cowley, near Uxbridge, and he was curate at the Tower of London in 1736. Through George Whitefield's influence he obtained the lectureship at St Helen's Bishopsgate, but as some of the parishioners objected to Whitefield's preaching from its pulpit he withdrew from the post. He visited the prisoners in Newgate Prison and was indefatigable in doing good.

In 1741 he was appointed lecturer at Allhallows, Lombard Street, and two years later was elected secretary to the Society for Promoting Christian Knowledge, a position which he retained until his death. His only other preferment was the living of Wotton in Surrey, which he held from 1752 to 1777. He died at the society's house in Hatton Garden, London, 21 December 1777. He held his fellowship at Exeter College until July 1741. In 1742 he married Miss Capel, by whom he had fifteen children, five of whom died young. A portrait of Broughton hangs in the board-room of the Society for Promoting Christian Knowledge.

== Works ==
Two outspoken sermons of his attained great popularity: The Christian Soldier, or the Duties of a Religious Life recommended to the Army, which was preached in 1737, printed in 1738, and reached its twelfth edition in 1818, a Welsh translation having appeared in 1797; and A Serious and Affectionate Warning to Servants, occasioned by the brutal murder of a mistress by her male servant aged only 19, and issued in 1746, ninth edition 1818.
