= Christian sororities =

Religious social organizations for women

While most of the traditional women's fraternities or sororities were founded decades before the start of the 20th century, the first ever specifically Christian-themed Greek Letter Organization formed was the Kappa Phi Club, founded in Kansas in 1916. Kappa Phi was a women's sisterhood that developed out of a bible study and remains one of the largest nationally present Christian women's collegiate clubs today. Later organizations added more defined social programming along with a Christian emphasis, bridging the gap between non-secular traditional sororities and church-sponsored bible study groups, campus ministries, and sect-based clubs and study groups.

== History ==
All collegiate fraternities and sororities, beginning with Phi Beta Kappa in 1776, had, at inception, either a tacit or overt spiritual component. This may have been as simple as an official opening or closing prayer, expanding to Biblical lessons contained within rituals, and rules regarding behavior that are modeled on various Christian or Jewish strictures. Over time, traditional (~original) fraternities and sororities have relaxed some of the wording of their rituals and codes to allow a more pluralistic model and open membership to a broader group of collegians.

=== Insularity, then integration ===
The rise of specifically Jewish, then Catholic, then Black, and then specifically Christian fraternities and sororities was a response (by the Jewish and Catholic groups first, then by students of non-white ethnicity) to the desire for fraternal membership where membership was barred. But it was important to note that, in context, America was far more insular in the pre-WWII era; in many cases Jewish and Catholic families, and their rabbis and priests wished to ensure that their children socialized primarily within their own religious traditions, thus establishing their own, competing Greek Letter organizations (GLOs) distinct from the "WASPy" traditional Greeks. After the integration of World War II GIs and the war's immediate aftermath, colleges and workplaces were abruptly far more integrated. Before WWII, relatively few Black or Hispanic students entered college in the US. But this would change with the passage of the G.I. Bill. Soon, the separate Jewish national fraternities and scattered locals began to merge, responding as traditional Greek chapters became more open to religious integration, adding Jewish and Catholic members. Today, only a fraction of Jewish fraternities remain, after multiple mergers, but Jewish students maintained strong participation in fraternities and sororities. Similarly, Catholic nationals and locals merged, began opening chapters on non-Catholic campuses, and welcomed students of Protestant heritage. Interestingly, predominantly Black, then Hispanic and Asian GLOs, which likewise began to form, have remained widely popular, some using the moniker "Multicultural" although they and all national GLOs have removed "bias clauses" from their governing documents and policies, and all are racially integrated.

The idea of separate, thematic-focused fraternities and sororities continued to interest a portion of Christian students, their families, and spiritual leaders. Long-established Bible study groups took on Greek Letter names, the first being Kappa Phi, a Bible-study and service club on twenty-four campuses; Yet the Kappa Phi Club still does not self-identify as a social sorority. Some organizers, assuming that the traditional GLOs lacked sufficient moral guardrails in pursuit of social programming, emerged to create the first objectively Christian (Protestant, then Evangelical) fraternities and sororities.

Traditionally, the formation of the Christian sororities, later to become national organizations, has followed the establishment of Christian fraternities, some as independent groups, and some in a "brother/sister" relationship, except in the case of Alpha Delta Chi, the first such Christian-emphasis organization on its campus. That sorority was founded in 1925, while Alpha Gamma Omega was founded in 1927, two years later, likewise at UCLA. Viewed broadly, these Christian Greek organizations enjoyed local success in their early years, but they did not experience the national growth seen by more traditional Greek organizations.

=== 1980s resurgence ===
A more novel situation occurred in 1987 when Chi Alpha Omega was founded as a co-educational Christian Greek organization. It wasn't until 1998 that Sigma Alpha Omega broke off from Chi Alpha Omega to form a women's-only ministry. Sigma Alpha Omega is now governed by a separate national president and board of trustees, and has grown to include 33 chapters throughout the country. Chi Alpha Omega continues as a men's organization.

In 1988, the founding of Sigma Phi Lambda on the campus of the University of Texas at Austin sparked new growth among Christian sororities. "Phi Lamb" was founded by women who saw value in the brotherhood exemplified by Beta Upsilon Chi and wished to create a female counterpart, since ΒΥΧ was a male-only organization. Sigma Phi Lambda today has an executive director, national board of directors, and regional directors, and is the largest Christian social sorority in the nation, with thirty-one chapters.

== List of sororities ==
Where collegiate, several are noted in the Almanac of Fraternities and Sororities. Where there is no current information on the number of chapters, a question mark appears; these groups may be dormant.

Name	Symbols	Chartered	Founding location	Scope	Type	Secondary emphasis	Active chapters	Status	Ref.
Alpha Alpha Gamma Psi	ΑΑΓΨ	April 20, 2011	Chester, South Carolina	Regional	Community-based	African American	4	Active	
Alpha Delta Chi	ΑΔΧ	1925	University of California, Los Angeles	National	Collegiate	Social	22	Active	
Alpha Eta Theta	ΑΗΘ	September 13, 2007	Mitchellville, Maryland	Local	Community-based	African American	1	Active	
Alpha Lambda Omega	ΑΛΩ	April 9, 1990	University of Texas at Austin	National	Collegiate	Inter-denominational, multicultural	16	Active	
Alpha Nu Omega	ΑΝΩ	November 3, 1988	Morgan State University	National	Collegiate	Multicultural, fraternity and sorority	21	Active	
Alpha Omega Chi	ΑΩΧ	October 25, 2015	Cincinnati Christian University	Local	Community-based	African American	1	Active	
Alpha Psi Alpha	ΑΨΑ	2017	United States	Local	Community-based	African American	1	Active	
Alpha Psi Gamma	ΑΨΓ	2007	United States	Local	Collegiate	Multicultural	0	Inactive	
Alpha Theta Omega	ΑΘΩ	March 11, 2002	Tennessee State University	Regional	Collegiate	African American	12	Active	
Chi Nu Alpha	ΨΝΑ	June 3, 2007	United States	Regional	Community-based	African American		Active	
Daughters of Christ Soarority		2010	United States		Community-based	African American		Inactive	
Delta Alpha Chi	ΔΑΧ	2006	Florida State University	Local	Collegiate	Social	1	Active	
Delta Iota Delta	ΔΙΔ	October 10, 2019	Gainesville, Florida	National	Community-based	African American	7	Active	
Delta Omega Delta	ΔΩΔ		Atlanta, Georgia	Local	Community-based	African American		Active	
Delta Phi Psi	ΔΦΨ	June 10, 2008	United States	Local	Community-based	African American	1	Inactive	
Delta Psi Epsilon	ΔΨΕ	January 16, 1999	Oakwood University	National	Collegiste	African American	18	Active	
Elogeme Adolphi	ΕΑ	October 17, 1987	Bradley University	National	Collegiate	African American	16	Active	
Eta Alpha	ΗΑ	2015	United States			African American		Inactive ?	
Eta Iota Sigma	ΗΙΣ	1992	Texas Christian University	Regional	Collegiate	Social	2	Active	
Gamma Alpha Lambda	ΓΑΛ	2003	United States	National	Collegiate	Social	4	Active	
Iota Sigma Chi	ΙΣΧ	February 2, 2021	McDonough, Georgia	Local	Community-based	African American	1	Active	
Kappa Gamma Sigma	ΚΓΣ	January 1, 2018	Chicago, Illinois	National	Community-based	African American	5	Active	
Kappa Phi	ΚΦ	1916	University of Kansas	National	Collegiate		50	Active	
Lambda Chi Omega	ΛΧΩ	2020	Huntsville, Alabama	Regional	Community-based	African American	6	Active	
Lambda Omicron Chi	ΛΟΧ	May 1, 2002	Old Dominion University	National	Community-based	Multicultural	15	Active	
Lambda Psi Alpha	ΛΨΑ	February 17, 2018	Columbia, South Carolina	International	Community-based	African American	6	Active	
Mu Alpha Mu	ΜΑΜ	2016	United States	National	Community-based	African American	25	Active	
Mu Epsilon Theta	ΜΕΘ	January 16, 1987	University of Texas at Austin	Local	Collegiate	Catholic	1	Active	
Phi Beta Chi	ΦΒΧ	March 26, 1978	University of Illinois	National	Collegiate	Social	7	Active	
Psi Delta Chi	ΨΔΧ	October 2, 1994	University of Wisconsin–Milwaukee	Local	Community-based	African American	1	Active	(Note: Not to be confused with the Military Sorority of the same name.)
Sigma Alpha Omega	ΣΑΩ	January 1998	North Carolina State University	National	Collegiate	Social	36	Active	
Sigma Omega Mu	ΣΩΜ	2010	United States	Local	Community-based	African American	0	Inactive	
Sigma Phi Chi	ΣΦΧ	2001	Austin College	Local	Collegiate		1	Active	
Sigma Phi Lambda	ΣΦΛ	November 14, 1988	University of Texas at Austin	National	Collegiate	Social	32	Active	
Sigma Tau Sigma	ΣΤΣ	March 7, 2017	Lithonia, Georgia	National	Community-based	African American	5	Active	
Tau Beta Gamma	ΤΒΓ	August 8, 2018	Lithonia, Georgia	Local	Community-based	African American	1	Active	
Tau Rho Mu	ΤΡΜ	October 19, 2017	Montgomery, Alabama	Local	Community-based	African American	1	Active	
Theta Alpha	ΘΑ	April 2006	Florida State University	Regional	Collegiate	Social	3	Active	
Theta Phi Sigma	ΘΦΣ	2009	United States	International	Community-based	African American	33	Active	
Zeta Iota Chi	ΖΙΧ	2003	United States	Local	Community-based	African American	0	Inactive	
Zeta Nu Delta	ΖΝΔ	August 6, 2013	South Carolina	Regional	Community-based	African American	5	Active	
Zeta Phi Zeta	ΖΦΖ	April 11, 2001	Chicago, Illinois	Local	Community-based	African American fraternity and sorority	1	Active	

== See also ==
- Christian fraternities
- Cultural interest fraternities and sororities
- List of social fraternities and sororities
