= Christian fraternity =

Christian fraternity can refer to:

== Organisations ==
- Christian fraternities
- Christinan sororities
- Religious order
- Confraternity

== Concepts ==
- Brothers and Sisters in Christ

== See also ==
- Fraternity (philosophy)
- Fratelli tutti
