= List of Sigma Alpha Omega chapters =

Sigma Alpha Omega is an American Christian sorority for women. It was established at North Carolina State University on January 5, 1998. In the following list of Sigma Alpha Omega chapter, active chapters are indicated in bold and inactive chapters are indicated in italics.

Chapter	Charter date and range	Institution	Location	Status	Ref.
**Alpha**	January 5, 1998	North Carolina State University	Raleigh, North Carolina	Active	
**Beta**	Fall 1999	Appalachian State University	Boone, North Carolina	Active	
Gamma	Spring 2001–c. 2016	Elon University	Elon, North Carolina	Inactive	
Delta	2002 – 20xx ?	Millikin University	Decatur, Illinois	Inactive	
Epsilon	Fall 1999 – 20xx ?, 2017–202x ?	University of Missouri	Columbia, Missouri	Inactive	
Zeta colony	200x ?–20xx ?	University of California, Berkeley	Berkeley, California	Inactive	
Eta	2003–201x ?	Shaw University	Raleigh, North Carolina	Inactive	
**Theta**	Fall 2003	Georgia College and State University	Milledgeville, Georgia	Active	
Iota	Spring 2004 - 20xx	East Carolina University	Greenville, North Carolina	Inactive	
Kappa colony	2004–20xx ?	Bethel University	Arden Hills, Minnesota	Inactive	
Lambda	2004–20xx ?	California State University, Chico	Chico, California	Inactive	
**Mu**	Fall 2004	University of Georgia	Athens, Georgia	Active	
**Nu**	Spring 2005	Western Carolina University	Cullowhee, North Carolina	Active	
Xi	2005–201x ?	Illinois Wesleyan University	Bloomington, Illinois	Inactive	
**Omicron**	April 20, 2005	University of North Carolina, Wilmington	Wilmington, North Carolina	Active	
Pi	March 2006	University of West Georgia	Carrollton, Georgia	Inactive	
Rho	Spring 2006–c. 2016	Valdosta State University	Valdosta, Georgia	Inactive	
Sigma	20xx ?–20xx ?	Alma College	Alma, Michigan	Inactive	
Tau	20xx ?–20xx ?	Atlanta Christian College (now Point University)	East Point, Georgia	Inactive	
**Upsilon**	January 14, 2017 ?–20xx ?, January 14, 2017	University of North Carolina, Charlotte	Charlotte, North Carolina	Active	
Phi colony	20xx ?–20xx ?	Georgia Southwestern State University	Americus, Georgia	Inactive	
**Chi**	Fall 2007	University of South Carolina	Columbia, South Carolina	Active	
Psi	Spring 2008–c. 2018	University of New Mexico	Albuquerque, New Mexico	Inactive	
Omega	200x ?–Fall 2016	Cameron University	Lawton, Oklahoma	Inactive	
Alpha Alpha	May 8, 2009	James Madison University	Harrisonburg, Virginia	Inactive	
Alpha Beta	April 30, 2010	University of North Carolina, Greensboro	Greensboro, North Carolina	Inactive	
Alpha Gamma	2010–20xx ?	Armstrong State University (now Georgia Southern University–Armstrong Campus)	Savannah, Georgia	Inactive	
**Alpha Delta**	Fall 2010	Christopher Newport University	Newport News, Virginia	Active	
Alpha Epsilon	Spring 2012	University of Wisconsin	Madison, Wisconsin	Inactive	
Alpha Zeta	Fall 2012 -20xx	University of Virginia's College at Wise	Wise, Virginia	Inactive	
Alpha Eta	201x ?–20xx ?	Palm Beach Atlantic University	West Palm Beach, Florida	Inactive	
Alpha Theta	April 27, 2013–Spring 2020	University of Virginia	Charlottesville, Virginia	Inactive	
Alpha Iota	2013–20xx ?	University of Delaware	Newark, Delaware	Inactive	
Alpha Kappa	June 2013–202x ?	Georgia State University	Atlanta, Georgia	Inactive	
**Alpha Lambda**	November 1, 2013	Radford University	Radford, Virginia	Active	
Alpha Mu	Fall 2013 – 20xx ?; May 3, 2025	Virginia Tech	Blacksburg, Virginia	Active	
Alpha Nu	30	Lindsey Wilson College	Columbia, Kentucky	Inactive	
**Alpha Xi**	November 15, 2013	Campbell University	Buie's Creek, North Carolina	Active	
**Alpha Omicron**	Fall 2013	Clemson University	Clemson, South Carolina	Active	
Alpha Pi	January 3, 2014–202x ?	Towson University	Towson, Maryland	Inactive	
Alpha Rho	January 10, 2014	University of South Florida Sarasota-Manatee	Sarasota, Florida	Inactive	
Alpha Sigma	March 1, 2014	Kennesaw State University	Kennesaw, Georgia	Inactive	
Alpha Tau	2014–20xx ?	State University of New York–Albany	Albany, New York	Inactive	
Alpha Upsilon	April 12, 2014–c. 2020	Lee University	Cleveland, Tennessee	Inactive	
Alpha Phi	2014–2016	Emory University	Atlanta, Georgia	Inactive	
Alpha Chi	January 9, 2015	University of Michigan	Ann Arbor, Michigan	Inactive	
Alpha Psi	February 6, 2015	Longwood University	Farmville, Virginia	Inactive	
Alpha Omega	December 12, 2015	Michigan State University	East Lansing, Michigan	Inactive	
Beta Alpha	April 30, 2016	Roanoke College	Salem, Virginia	Inactive	
Beta Beta	May 14, 2016	Mars Hill University	Mars Hill, North Carolina	Inactive	
Beta Gamma	December 10, 2016 – 20xx ?	Mid-Atlantic Christian University	Elizabeth City, North Carolina	Inactive	
**Beta Delta**	January 27, 2017	Jacksonville State University	Jacksonville, Alabama	Active	
Beta Epsilon	February 10, 2017	Emmanuel College	Franklin Springs, Georgia	Inactive	
**Beta Zeta**	August 25, 2017	Vanguard University	Costa Mesa, California	Active	
**Beta Eta**	May 12, 2018	West Chester, PA	West Chester, Pennsylvania	Active	(Note: Previously affiliated with West Chester University.)
**Beta Theta**	February 16, 2019 - 20xx	University of Pittsburgh	Pittsburgh, Pennsylvania	Inactive	
**Beta Iota**	November 22, 2019	Eastern University	St. David's, Pennsylvania	Active	
Beta Lambda	March 7, 2020	Texas A&M University	Texarkana, Texas	Inactive	
**Beta Mu**	September 8, 2020	University of Texas, Austin	Austin, Texas	Active	
**Beta Nu**	January 7, 2022	University of North Georgia	Dahlonega, Georgia	Active	
