= Sigma Phi Lambda =

American Christian sorority

- ΣΦΛ
- Founded: 1988; 38 years ago University of Texas at Austin
- Type: Social
- Affiliation: Independent
- Status: Active
- Emphasis: Christian
- Scope: National
- Slogan: "Sisters for the Lord'"
- Colors: Red and White
- Mascot: Lamb
- Philanthropy: World Vision
- Chapters: 27 active, 17 inactive
- Nickname: Phi Lamb
- Headquarters: Austin, Texas; United States
- Website: www.sigmaphilambda.org

Sigma Phi Lambda (ΣΦΛ), also known as Sisters for the Lord or Phi Lamb, is a Christian sorority founded in 1988 in Austin, Texas.

== History ==
Sigma Phi Lambda was founded in 1988 at the University of Texas at Austin. Phi Lamb was part of a broader movement to establish Christian sororities during the mid-1980s, as the Evangelical Christian movement was on the rise in the United States. fIts founders were Patricia Adams Hogan, Robin Maedgen, Gina Williams Goveas, Jacqueline Goveas, and Eileen Howell Barlow.

Phi Lamb itself was also a part of the same movement as it affected men's fraternities. The establishment of Sigma Phi Lambda can be linked to the founders' experiences and interactions with their male counterparts, who had, three years earlier, founded the Christian fraternity, Beta Upsilon Chi at Texas.

Sigma Phi Lambda has also spread the idea of Christian Greek Organizations. After the establishment of the Texas Tech University chapter, a group of men founded Kappa Upsilon Chi to serve as a counterpart.

Since establishment, the number of chapters has grown rapidly. The chapters on the campuses of the University of Texas, Texas A&M, Texas Tech, Oklahoma, Oklahoma State and Florida have well over 100 sisters, and the sorority continues to actively develop new chapters around the country.

Many local sororities arose during same period as Phi Lamb's founding across the country, but only a handful were successful in national expansion. Phi Lamb's success was accomplished through incorporation, a national board of directors and a national director.

Sigma Phi Lambda was the third National Sorority for Christian women, independent of a Greek council for colleges and universities. Alpha Delta Chi was first in 1925 founded at UCLA. Sigma Alpha Omega was the first sorority to be founded in the 1980s resurgence of Christian Greek Life, founded at East Carolina University in 1987. Phi Lamb seeks spiritual development through their sisterhood. Their traditions develop these standards.

== Symbols ==
The symbols of Phi Lamb include:

- Official colors: Red and white, symbolizing the blood and purity of Jesus Christ
- Official mascot: A lamb named Baasheeba, symbolizes the sisters' relationship with Jesus Christ. The mascot is also based on the nickname of "Phi Lamb" and the Psalm 100:3.
- Official belief statement: the Apostles' Creed

Sigma Phi Lambda's verse is Romans 15:5-6 ~ "May the God who gives endurance and encouragement give you a spirit of unity among yourselves as you follow Christ Jesus, so that with one heart and one mouth you may glorify the God and Father of our Lord Jesus Christ."

== Activities ==
Sigma Phi Lambda holds multiple social and philanthropic events each semester to promote external growth and outreach. These are sometimes done with other Christian organizations on campus. Devotionals or testimonies are given at such open parties. The sorority's national charitable focus is World Vision, a Christian humanitarian organization dedicated to working with children, families and their communities worldwide.

Phi Lamb has various prayer nights, prayer groups, and prayer partners within the chapter. Prayer partners are accountability partners that are set up for spending quality time with another sister to pray and get to know one another better. Phi Lamb has engagement circles that are a way of honoring ladies who become engaged while members.

Phi Lamb has an official dance that is danced to the song "Shackles" by Mary Mary.Small groups that operate within chapter meetings, used for discussion, prayer, and various activities.

== Membership ==
Sigma Phi Lambda is not like most traditional sororities because it is a non-denominational and non-Panhellenic sorority. While most traditional sororities and even some Christian sororities limit potential new members from holding membership in more than one sorority, Sigma Phi Lambda allows other sorority initiates to be initiated into Phi Lamb and also allows Phi Lamb members to hold multiple Greek affiliations including but not limited to membership in National Panhellenic Conference and National Pan-Hellenic Council sororities.

Sigma Phi Lambda does not offer membership bids. The stance of the organization is that a woman is to choose Phi Lamb. Phi Lamb does not choose their members or exclude women from membership.

Membership is open to any undergraduate or graduate student, another uniqueness considering most sororities limit membership to undergraduates only. Married women may also become members of Sigma Phi Lambda, so long as she is still a student. Members "pledge" for one semester where they are the "little sisters" before being initiated into the sorority. Initiation is a formal event. It is conducted according to a complete and secret script written by the founding mothers. The tradition of initiation is very important to Phi Lamb and is treated as such. There are several informal traditions each chapter follows in regards to initiation, such as: going out to dinner afterwards, giving James Avery pins during initiation, big sisters edifying their little sisters, and giving flowers to retiring officers at the closing ceremony for the new officers.

== Governance ==
National Board of Directors – Phi Lamb is governed by a board of directors made up of five alumnae who make policy decisions for the organization.

Executive Director – The executive director, or ED, helps found new Phi Lamb chapters, assisting the board with daily tasks, and plans the All-Chapter Officer Retreat.

Regional Directors – Regional Directors oversee multiple chapters. They work with the Alumnae Council and visit chapters to help guide the chapter in planning and decision-making.

Alumnae Councils – After a chapter has been established long enough to have alumnae, an Alumnae Council is formed. Made up of three members, these must be former officers or founders of that chapter. The Alumnae Council provides guidance to the chapter and assistance to the Regional Director.

Officers – Five officers are elected annually in each chapter, generally in the Spring. The offices are: President, Vice President, Chaplain, Secretary, and Treasurer. These officers perform the daily functions and lead the members of their chapter. There are also a number of appointed officer positions in each chapter depending on the chapter's individual needs. All officers must sign and abide by a covenant created by the national board.

Actives – Active, or initiated, members of Phi Lamb are considered the "big sisters" of their chapter. They hold voting rights and may hold elected or appointed officer positions.

New Members – New members of Phi Lamb, or uninitiated members, are termed the "little sisters" of their chapter. The terminology, an extension of a "big sister/little sister" dynamic was designed to reduce the risk of hazing, and is described by the sorority in familial terms: "little sisters are cherished by their big sisters" and are a vital part of Phi Lamb. Upon initiation into the sorority, they become Active members.

== Chapters ==
This is the list of chapters of Sigma Phi Lambda. Active chapters and colonies are noted in bold, inactive chapters in italics.

Chapter	Charter date and range	Institution	Location	Status	Ref.
**Alpha**	1988	University of Texas at Austin	Austin, Texas	Active	
**Beta**	1990	Texas A&M University	College Station, Texas	Active	
**Gamma**	1991	Texas Tech University	Lubbock, Texas	Active	
**Delta**	1992	Stephen F. Austin State University	Nacogdoches, Texas	Active	
**Epsilon**	1997	Texas State University	San Marcos, Texas	Active	
Zeta	1998–2020 ?	Southwestern University	Georgetown, Texas	Inactive	
**Eta**	1999	Houston Baptist University	Sharpstown, Houston, Texas	Active	
Theta	2001–2020 ?	Baylor University	Waco, Texas	Inactive	
**Iota**	2002	Angelo State University	San Angelo, Texas	Active	
Kappa	2002–2012, 2024	Sam Houston State University	Huntsville, Texas	Active	
Lambda	2003 ?–20xx ?	Oklahoma Baptist University	Shawnee, Oklahoma	Inactive	
**Mu**	2003	University of Oklahoma	Norman, Oklahoma	Active	
**Nu**	2003	University of Florida	Gainesville, Florida	Active	
Xi	2003 ?–20xx ?	Claflin University	Orangeburg, South Carolina	Inactive	
**Omicron**	2003	Tarleton State University	Stephenville, Texas	Active	
Pi	2004 ?–20xx ?	Lamar University	Beaumont, Texas	Inactive	
Rho	2004 ?–20xx ?	College of Charleston	Charleston, South Carolina	Inactive	
Sigma	2004 ?–20xx ?	University of Alabama at Birmingham	Birmingham, Alabama	Inactive	
**Tau**	2005	University of Arkansas	Fayetteville, Arkansas	Active	
**Upsilon**	2006	University of North Texas	Denton, Texas	Active	
**Phi**	2006	Oklahoma State University	Stillwater, Oklahoma	Active	
Chi	2006–2020 ?	University of Missouri	Columbia, Missouri	Inactive	
**Psi**	2006–2024	Mississippi State University	Starkville, Mississippi	Inactive	
**Omega**	2007	University of Central Oklahoma	Edmond, Oklahoma	Active	
**Alpha Alpha**	2007	University of Mississippi	Oxford, Mississippi	Active	
**Alpha Beta**	2007	University of Central Florida	Orange County, Florida	Active	
**Alpha Gamma**	2008	Vanderbilt University	Nashville, Tennessee	Active	
Alpha Delta	2008–2020 ?	Midwestern State University	Wichita Falls, Texas	Inactive	
Alpha Epsilon	2009 ?–20xx ?	Wayland Baptist University	Plainview, Texas	Inactive	
**Alpha Zeta**	2011	University of Tennessee	Knoxville, Tennessee	Active	
**Alpha Eta**	2011	University of Central Arkansas	Conway, Arkansas	Active	
Alpha Theta	2011–2021	Louisiana State University	Baton Rouge, Louisiana	Inactive	
Alpha Iota	2011–2019 ?	Southern Arkansas University	Magnolia, Arkansas	Inactive	
Alpha Kappa	2011 ?–20xx ?	Longwood University	Farmville, Virginia	Inactive	
Alpha Lambda	2012–2020 ?	University of Tampa	Tampa, Florida	Inactive	
**Alpha Mu**	2012	Auburn University	Auburn, Alabama	Active	
Alpha Nu	2013–2019 ?	University of Tulsa	Tulsa, Oklahoma	Inactive	
Alpha Xi	2013–2020 ?	Henderson State University	Arkadelphia, Arkansas	Inactive	
**Alpha Omicron**	2014	Southern Methodist University	University Park, Texas	Active	
**Alpha Pi**	2015	Louisiana Tech University	Ruston, Louisiana	Active	
**Alpha Rho**	2016	University of Tennessee at Chattanooga	Chattanooga, Tennessee	Active	
**Alpha Sigma**	2017	Texas Christian University	Fort Worth, Texas	Active	
Alpha Tau	2018–2022	University of Kentucky	Lexington, Kentucky	Inactive	
**Alpha Upsilon**	2020	Texas Woman's University	Denton, Texas	Active	
**Alpha Phi**	2021	West Texas A&M University	Canyon, Texas	Active	
**Alpha Chi**	2021	Southwestern Oklahoma State University	Weatherford, Oklahoma	Active	
**Alpha Psi**	2021	Ohio State University	Columbus, Ohio	Active	

== See also ==
- List of social sororities and women's fraternities
