= List of Beta Upsilon Chi chapters =

Beta Upsilon Chi is the largest Christian fraternity in the United States. Following is a list of Beta Upsilon Chi chapters, with active chapters in bold and inactive chapters in italics.

Chapter	Charter date and range	Institution	City	State	Status	Ref.
**Alpha**	April 27, 1985	University of Texas	Austin	Texas	Active	
**Beta**	1989	Texas Christian University	Fort Worth	Texas	Active	
**Gamma**	1994	Texas A&M University	College Station	Texas	Active	
Delta	1995–20xx ?	Stephen F. Austin University	Nacogdoches	Texas	Inactive	
Epsilon	1997–xxxx ?	Houston Baptist University	Houston	Texas	Inactive	
**Zeta**	1997	Texas State University	San Marcos	Texas	Active	
**Eta**	1998	Texas Tech University	Lubbock	Texas	Active	
Theta	1999–2021	University of North Texas	Denton	Texas	Inactive	
**Iota**	2000	Baylor University	Waco	Texas	Active	
**Kappa**	2000	University of Oklahoma	Norman	Oklahoma	Active	
**Lambda colony**	2002–20xx ?	Sam Houston State University	Huntsville	Texas	Colony	(Note: Chapter was reformed as a colony in 2021.)
**Mu**	2003	Southern Methodist University	Dallas	Texas	Active	
**Nu**	2003	Vanderbilt University	Nashville	Tennessee	Active	
**Xi**	2004	University of Arkansas	Fayetteville	Arkansas	Active	
**Omicron**	2005	Mississippi State University	Starkville	Mississippi	Active	
**Pi**	2005	University of Georgia	Athens	Georgia	Active	
**Rho**	2005	Oklahoma State University	Stillwater	Oklahoma	Active	
Sigma	2006–20xx ?	University of Missouri	Columbia	Missouri	Inactive	
Tau	2007–201x ?	University of Southern Mississippi	Hattiesburg	Mississippi	Inactive	
Upsilon	2007–20xx ?	University of Florida	Gainesville	Florida	Inactive	
Phi	2007–201x ?	University of Colorado	Boulder	Colorado	Inactive	
Chi	2007–2024	University of Mississippi	Oxford	Mississippi	Inactive	
**Psi**	2008	Louisiana State University	Baton Rouge	Louisiana	Active	
**Omega**	2008	Auburn University	Auburn	Alabama	Active	
**Alpha Alpha**	2009–201x ?	North Carolina State University	Raleigh	North Carolina	Colony	(Note: Chapter was reformed as a colony in 2023.)
Alpha Beta	2009–20xx ?	University of Kansas	Lawrence	Kansas	Inactive	
**Alpha Gamma**	2010	University of Central Arkansas	Conway	Arkansas	Active	
Alpha Delta	2010–201x ?	Southern Arkansas University	Magnolia	Arkansas	Inactive	
**Alpha Epsilon**	2011	University of Central Oklahoma	Edmond	Oklahoma	Active	
**Alpha Zeta**	2012	University of Tennessee	Knoxville	Tennessee	Active	
**Alpha Eta**	2012	Clemson University	Clemson	South Carolina	Active	
Alpha Theta	2012–20xx ?	Yale University	New Haven	Connecticut	Inactive	
**Alpha Iota**	2013	University of Alabama	Tuscaloosa	Alabama	Active	
**Alpha Kappa**	2013	University of Michigan	Ann Arbor	Michigan	Active	
**Alpha Lambda**	2014	University of Tennessee at Chattanooga	Chattanooga	Tennessee	Active	
**Alpha Mu colony**	2014–20xx ?	University of Kentucky	Lexington	Kentucky	Colony	(Note: Chapter was reformed as a colony in 2022.)
Alpha Nu	2014–2016	College of Charleston	Charleston	South Carolina	Inactive	
Alpha Xi	2014–20xx ?	Louisiana Tech University	Ruston	Louisiana	Inctive	
Alpha Omicron	2015–2016	Miami University	Oxford	Ohio	Inactive	
Alpha Pi	2015–20xx ?	Michigan State University	East Lansing	Michigan	Inactive	
**Alpha Rho**	2015	University of North Carolina at Chapel Hill	Chapel Hill	North Carolina	Active	
**Alpha Sigma**	2016	University of Tulsa	Tulsa	Oklahoma	Active	
**Alpha Tau**	2016	East Tennessee State University	Johnson City	Tennessee	Active	
Alpha Upsilon	2016–20xx ?	Kansas State University	Manhattan	Kansas	Inactive	
Alpha Phi	2016–20xx ?	University of South Carolina	Columbia	South Carolina	Inactive	
**Alpha Chi**	2017	Purdue University	West Lafayette	Indiana	Active	
Alpha Psi	2018–20xx ?	Indiana University	Bloomington	Indiana	Inactive	
**Alpha Omega**	2019	Ohio State University	Columbus	Ohio	Active	
**Beta Alpha**	2025	Virginia Tech	Blacksburg	Virginia	Active	
**Beta Beta**	2026	Mercer University	Macon	Georgia	Active	
**Beta Gamma**	2026	Georgia Southern University	Statesboro	Georgia	Active	
Southwestern Oklahoma State colony	October 25, 2019 – 2023	Southwestern Oklahoma State University	Weatherford	Oklahoma	Inactive	
**Kennesaw State colony**		Kennesaw State University	Kennesaw	Georgia	Colony	
**James Madison colony**		James Madison University	Harrisonburg	Virginia	Colony	
**Florida State colony**		Florida State University	Tallahassee	Florida	Colony	
