= List of Kappa Phi chapters =

Kappa Phi, also called the Kappa Phi Club, is an American national Christian student society.

== Collegiate chapters ==
In the following list of collegiate chapters, active chapters are indicated in bold and inactive chapters are in italics.

| Chapter | Charter date and range | University | Location | Status | Ref. |
|---|---|---|---|---|---|
| Alpha | 1916 | University of Kansas | Lawrence, Kansas | Inactive | |
| Beta | 1917 | University of Iowa | Iowa City, Iowa | Inactive | |
| Gamma | December 13, 1917 | Iowa State University | Ames, Iowa | Inactive | |
| Delta | 1919 | University of Minnesota | Minneapolis, Minnesota | Inactive | |
| Epsilon | 1919 | Ohio State University | Columbus, Ohio | Inactive | |
| Zeta | 1920 | University of Nebraska | Lincoln, Nebraska | Inactive | |
| Eta | 1920 | University of Wyoming | Laramie, Wyoming | Inactive | |
| Theta | 1920 | Oklahoma State University–Stillwater | Stillwater, Oklahoma | Inactive | |
| Iota | 1921 | Kansas State Agricultural College | Manhattan, Kansas | Inactive | |
| Kappa | 1921 | University of Oklahoma | Norman, Oklahoma | Inactive | |
| **Lambda** | 1922 | Miami University | Oxford, Ohio | Active | |
| Mu | 1923 | University of Washington | Seattle, Washington | Inactive | |
| Nu | 1923 | University of Michigan | Ann Arbor, Michigan | Inactive | |
| Xi | 1924 | University of Pittsburgh | Pittsburgh, Pennsylvania | Inactive | |
| Omicron | 1927 | Smith College | Northampton, Massachusetts | Inactive | |
| Pi | 1927 | West Virginia University | Morgantown, West Virginia | Inactive | |
| Rho | 1927 | University of South Dakota | Vermillion, South Dakota | Inactive | |
| Sigma | 1927 | University of California, Berkeley | Berkeley, California | Inactive | |
| Tau | 1928 | University of Idaho | Moscow, Idaho | Inactive | |
| Upsilon | | Iowa State Teachers College (now University of Northern Iowa) | Cedar Falls, Iowa | Inactive | |
| **Phi** | 1928 | Ohio University | Athens, Ohio | Active | |
| Chi | 1932 | University of Puget Sound | Tacoma, Washington | Inactive | |
| Psi | 1933 | Fort Hays State University | Hays, Kansas | Inactive | |
| Omega | 1934 | San Jose State College | San Jose, California | Inactive | |
| Alpha Alpha | 1935 | Goucher College | Towson, Maryland | Inactive | |
| Alpha Beta | 1937 | Indiana University | Bloomington, Indiana | Inactive | |
| Alpha Gamma | May 21, 1938 | Bowling Green State University | Bowling Green, Ohio | Inactive | |
| Alpha Delta | 1942 | University of Colorado | Boulder, Colorado | Inactive | |
| Alpha Epsilon | 1942 | Southern Illinois University | Carbondale, Illinois | Inactive | |
| Alpha Zeta | 1943 | Mansfield University | Mansfield, Pennsylvania | Inactive | |
| **Alpha Eta** | 1943–19xx ?; April 24, 1993 | Northeastern State University | Tahlequah, Oklahoma | Active | |
| Alpha Theta | 1945 | Kansas State Teachers College | Emporia, Kansas | Inactive | |
| Alpha Iota | 1948 | Southwestern University | Georgetown, Texas | Inactive | |
| Alpha Kappa | 1948 | Pennsylvania State University | University Park, Pennsylvania | Inactive | |
| **Alpha Lambda** | 1948 | Kent State University | Kent, Ohio | Active | |
| Alpha Mu | 1952 | College of Emporia | Emporia, Kansas | Inactive | |
| Alpha Nu | 1952 | Bennett College | Greensboro, North Carolina | Inactive | |
| Alpha Xi | 1952 | Baldwin Wallace College | Berea, Ohio | Inactive | |
| Alpha Omicron | 1954 | Wichita State University | Wichita, Kansas | Inactive | |
| Alpha Pi | 1954 | Western Michigan University | Kalamazoo, Michigan | Inactive | |
| Alpha Rho | 1957 | Michigan State University | East Lansing, Michigan | Inactive | |
| Alpha Sigma | 1959 | West Virginia Wesleyan College | Buckhannon, West Virginia | Inactive | |
| Alpha Tau | 1959 | Central Michigan University | Mount Pleasant, Michigan | Inactive | |
| **Alpha Upsilon** | 1963 | Oklahoma City University | Oklahoma City, Oklahoma | Active | |
| Alpha Phi | 1964 | American University | Washington, D.C. | Inactive | |
| Alpha Chi | 1968 | University of Akron | Akron, Ohio | Inactive | |
| Alpha Psi | 1969 | Mount Union College | Alliance, Ohio | Inactive | |
| **Alpha Omega** | 1971 | Ohio Northern University | Ada, Ohio | Active | |
| Beta Alpha | 1983 | Eastern Michigan University | Ypsilanti, Michigan | Inactive | |
| Beta Beta | 1988 | West Liberty University | West Liberty, West Virginia | Inactive | |
| Beta Gamma | 1989 | Ohio Wesleyan University | Delaware, Ohio | Inactive | |
| **Beta Delta** | 1993 | University of Central Oklahoma | Edmond, Oklahoma | Active | |
| Beta Epsilon | 1993 | Bloomsburg University | Bloomsburg, Pennsylvania | Inactive | |
| Beta Zeta | 1995 | Southwestern Oklahoma State University | Weatherford, Oklahoma | Inactive | |
| Beta Eta | 1997 | PennWest Edinboro | Edinboro, Pennsylvania | Inactive | |
| **Beta Theta** | 1999 | Texas A&M University | College Station, Texas | Active | |
| **Beta Iota** | 2002 | Bradley University | Peoria, Illinois | Active | |
| **Beta Kappa** | April 21, 2012 | Palm Beach Atlantic University | West Palm Beach, Florida | Inactive | |
| **Beta Lambda** | 2014 | Northwestern State University | Natchitoches, Louisiana | Active | |
| Beta Mu | 2016 | Cincinnati Christian University | Cincinnati, Ohio | Inactive | (Note: College closed in 2019.) |
| Beta Nu | 2016 | Fresno Pacific University | Fresno, California | Inactive | |
| **Beta Xi** | | Rogers State University | Claremore, Oklahoma | Active | |

== Alumnae chapters ==
In the following list of alumnae chapters, active chapters are indicated in bold and inactive chapters are in italics.

| Chapter | Greek name | Charter date and range | Location | Status | Ref. |
|---|---|---|---|---|---|
| | Alpha | | Kansas | Inactive | |
| **Ames** | **Gamma** | | Ames, Iowa | Active | |
| Minneapolis | Delta | | Minneapolis, Minnesota | Inactive | |
| **Lincoln** | **Zeta** | | Lincoln, Nebraska | Active | |
| **Pittsburgh** | **Xi** | | Pittsburgh, Pennsylvania | Active | |
| | Sigma | | Berkeley, California | Inactive | |
| | Chi | | Tacoma, Washington | Inactive | |
| **Akron** | | | Akron, Ohio | Active | |
| **Athens** | | | Athens, Ohio | Active | |
| **Central Oklahoma** | | | Oklahoma City, Oklahoma | Active | |
| **Central Pennsylvania** | | | State College, Harrisburg, Hershey, Pennsylvania | Active | |
| **Cincinnati** | | | Cincinnati, Ohio | Active | |
| **Cleveland** | | | Cleveland, Ohio | Active | |
| **Columbus** | | | Columbus, Ohio | Active | |
| District of Columbia | | | Washington, D.C. | Inactive | |
| **Florida** | | | South Florida | Active | |
| **Illinois** | | | Peoria, Illinois | Active | |
| **Indiana** | | | Indianapolis, Indiana | Active | |
| **Kalamazoo** | | | Kalamazoo, Michigan | Active | |
| **Mansfield** | | | Mansfield, Pennsylvania | Active | |
| **Miami Valley** | | | Dayton, Ohio | Active | |
| **Mt. Pleasant** | | | Mount Pleasant, Michigan | Active | |
| **Northeast Oklahoma** | | | Tulsa, Oklahoma | Active | |
| **Northern Ohio Valley** | | | Southeast Ohio and Southwest Pennsylvania, and West Virginia | Active | |
| **Northwest Ohio** | | | Bowling Green, Ohio | Active | |
| **Texas** | | | Houston, Texas | Active | |
| **Wichita** | | | Wichita, Kansas | Active | |
