= BYX =

BYX may refer to:

- BYX Exchange, a stock exchange of BATS Global Markets
- Beta Upsilon Chi (ΒΥΧ), an American Christian social fraternity
