= Beta Sigma Psi =

American Lutheran college fraternity

- ΒΣΨ
- Founded: April 17, 1925; 101 years ago University of Illinois
- Type: Social
- Affiliation: NIC
- Status: Active
- Emphasis: Lutheran
- Scope: National
- Motto: Per Aspera Ad Astra
- Pillars: Faith, Loyalty, Brotherhood, Service
- Colors: Cardinal red and White
- Symbol: Luther's Emblem
- Flower: Gold Rose
- Publication: The Gold Rose
- Chapters: 12
- Members: 300+ active 7,500+ lifetime
- Nickname: Beta Sig
- Headquarters: 2408 Lebanon Avenue; Belleville, Illinois 62221; United States
- Website: www.betasigmapsi.org

Beta Sigma Psi National Lutheran Fraternity (ΒΣΨ), commonly known as Beta Sig, is a United States social organization for Lutheran college men. Founded at the University of Illinois in 1925, the fraternity has more than 7,500 initiated members. It has twelve chapters, primarily in the mid-west, and over 300 undergraduate members.

== Purpose ==
Beta Sigma Psi's purpose is to create an environment where the Lutheran college man can grow spiritually, scholastically, and socially. The fraternity undertakes programs designed to develop leaders, along with character, intellectual awareness, social responsibility, spiritual welfare, brotherhood, integrity, friendship, and justice.

== History ==
=== Founding ===
In 1911, Rev. Frederick William Gustav Stiegemeyer accepted a position at St. John's Evangelical Lutheran Church in Champaign, Illinois. As part of his ministry, he was to serve the students at the University of Illinois. In the fall of 1919, Stiegemeyer organized the Lutheran Illini League with ten students. The Lutheran Illini League met weekly for religious instructions and discussions on contemporary issues. In the fall of 1920, the group had twenty members and rented a house. In early 1921, it reorganized as the Concordia Club.

By 1923, the Concordia Club was active on campus and adopted the name Concordia Fraternity. Its members planned to expand into a new national Greek letter fraternity. Beta Sigma Psi filed Incorporation papers on April 17, 1925, in Springfield, Illinois. Its founders were Harold Ahlbrand, Wilbur E. Augustine, Norbert W. Behrens, Herman H. Gilster, Arden F. Henry, Russell Henry, Julius J. Seidel, Frederick William Gustav Stiegemeyer, and William H. Welge

=== Expansion ===
The Concordia Fraternity at Champaign corresponded with the Rev. Paul Schmidt, who had formed a similar organization at Purdue University for students. In May 1925, Alpha chapter members drove to Purdue to help organize the Beta chapter. Within months, the first National Council of Beta Sigma Psi was elected. Gamma chapter formed at the University of Michigan (1928) and Delta chapter at the University of Nebraska (1929). By this time, the Alpha chapter was building a new house.

When the depression of the 1930s hit, fraternity financing became very difficult. The Gamma chapter closed in 1933, and the Alpha chapter closed in 1940. During World War II, Beta Sigma Psi had only two active chapters, Beta and Delta, with a combined membership of fourteen men. An undergraduate member from the Delta chapter, Delmar Lienemann, was elected secretary-treasurer of the national fraternity, serving for 22 years. The fraternity's named its highest honor for Lienemann.

In 1949, the Epsilon chapter formed at Iowa State University. Expansion continued over the next few years as the Zeta chapter organized at Kansas State University in 1951, and the Eta chapter followed at the University of Missouri–Rolla in 1952. That year at the National Council meeting in Ames, Iowa, John Hingst, an alumnus of the Beta chapter, was elected national president and served for fourteen years in that position. In 1955, the Alpha chapter was reactivated. In 1962, the Iota chapter formed at the University of Missouri.

In the 1960s, chapters formed at Western Michigan University, Eastern Illinois University, and the University of Minnesota. Dick Weiss, an alumnus of the Epsilon chapter, became the fraternity's first salaried secretary-treasurer. The national headquarters moved from Omaha, Nebraska to St. Louis, Missouri. In 1969, Beta Sigma Psi became a full member of the National Interfraternity Conference (NIC), the first "niche" fraternity to be recognized as a full member of NIC.

Walter E. Rose, the campus pastor at Eastern Illinois University and pastoral adviser to the Mu chapter, moved to St. Louis in 1971 to succeed Dick Weiss as executive director. Rose helped to form Phi Beta Chi Lutheran sorority at the University of Illinois and served as the executive director of both organizations.

=== Challenge and resolve ===
From the 1970s through the early 1990s, around two-thirds of its chapters closed, including the Delta chapter which had the most initiated members of any Beta Sig chapter. Craig Varner of the Iota chapter was elected national president in 1996. Under his leadership, the fraternity created an annual membership education forum and revived its leadership academy. The expansion focus shifted from large universities to smaller colleges. With these changes, Beta Sigma Psi led all national fraternities in 1999 with a 97% increase in associate members from the previous academic year. During the first part of the 21st century, Beta Sigma Psi has continued to grow and the Delta chapter was rechartered in 2006.

== Symbols ==
Beta Sigma Psi's motto is Per Aspera Ad Astra. Its virtues or pillars are Faith, Loyalty, Brotherhood, Service.

Luther's Emblem or seal consists of a black cross inside of a red heart inside of a rose and represents the Lutheran faith. It is incorporated into the coat of arms and the badge. The badge consists of a black cross inside a heart superimposed on top of a golden rose (Luther's Emblem). The emblem is placed on a shield with the Greek letters ΒΣΨ in an arc above the rose. The variation of the badge includes eighteen pearls bordering the shield. The badge is worn by activated members.

Its colors are cardinal red and white. The fraternity's flag consists of a coat of arms on a field of cardinal red and white with letters in the upper left quadrant. The banner has the coat of arms on a cardinal red and white field. The gold rose is the fraternity's official flower. The fraternity's publication and yearly national formal are also named after the flower.

== Chapters ==
There are eleven active chapters, indicated in bold; inactive chapters are in italics.

Chapters	Charter date and range	Institution	Location	Status	Ref.
**Alpha**	April 17, 1925 – 1940; 1955	University of Illinois Urbana-Champaign	Urbana, Illinois	Active	
**Beta**	1925	Purdue University	West Lafayette, Indiana	Active	
Gamma	1928–1933	University of Michigan	Ann Arbor, Michigan	Inactive	
**Delta**	1929–1994, 2006	University of Nebraska–Lincoln	Lincoln, Nebraska	Active	
**Epsilon**	October 29, 1949	Iowa State University	Ames, Iowa	Active	
**Zeta**	1951	Kansas State University	Manhattan, Kansas	Active	
**Eta**	1952	Missouri University of Science and Technology	Rolla, Missouri	Active	
Theta	1962 – June 6, 1973	Michigan Technological University	Houghton, Michigan	Withdrew	(Note: Became Beta Sigma Theta (local) in 1973, still active on the Michigan Tech campus as of the spring of 2025.)
**Iota**	1962	University of Missouri	Columbia, Missouri	Active	
Kappa	1963–1983	University of Minnesota	Minneapolis and Saint Paul, Minnesota	Inactive	
Lambda	1964–1973, 2011–2014	Western Michigan University	Kalamazoo, Michigan	Inactive	
Mu	1966–1984	Eastern Illinois University	Charleston, Illinois	Inactive	
Nu	1967–1972, 2014-2023	University of Kansas	Lawrence, Kansas	Inactive	(Note: This chapter originated as Gamma Eta (local) in 1964.)
Xi	1967–1990	University of Nebraska at Kearney	Kearney, Nebraska	Inactive	
Omicron	1968–1973	Central Michigan University	Mount Pleasant, Michigan	Inactive	
Pi	1969–1989	University of Central Missouri	Warrensburg, Missouri	Inactive	
Rho	1969–1984	University of Minnesota Morris	Morris, Minnesota	Inactive	
Sigma	1969–1974	Wayne State College	Wayne, Nebraska	Inactive	
Tau	1970–1979	Oklahoma State University–Stillwater	Stillwater, Oklahoma	Inactive	
Upsilon	1980–1991	Illinois State University	Normal, Illinois	Inactive	
**Phi**	1988–1994, 2020	Texas A&M University	College Station, Texas	Active	
**Chi**	1999–2004, 2007–2008, 2017	Ohio State University	Columbus, Ohio	Active	
Psi	1999–2010	Concordia College	Bronxville, New York	Inactive	
**Omega**	2000–2002, 2010	Indiana University Bloomington	Bloomington, Indiana	Active	
**Alpha Alpha**	2001	Midland University	Fremont, Nebraska	Active	

== Graduate organizations ==
Beta Sigma Psi consists of three separate alumni corporations, each with a specific mission, purpose, and board of directors. The three corporations are the National Fraternity, the Education Foundation, and the Housing Foundation.

== Notable members ==
- Norbert T. Tiemann, Delta chapter – Governor of Nebraska
- Lloyd Karmeier, Alpha chapter – justice, Supreme Court of Illinois
- Brian Bosma, Beta chapter – speaker, Indiana House of Representatives
- Edward Mueller, Eta chapter – chairman and CEO, Qwest
- Mitch Holthus, Zeta Chapter - announcer, Kansas City Chiefs

== See also ==
- List of social fraternities
- Christian fraternities
