= Alpha Gamma Omega =

American Christ-centered collegiate fraternity

- ΑΓΩ
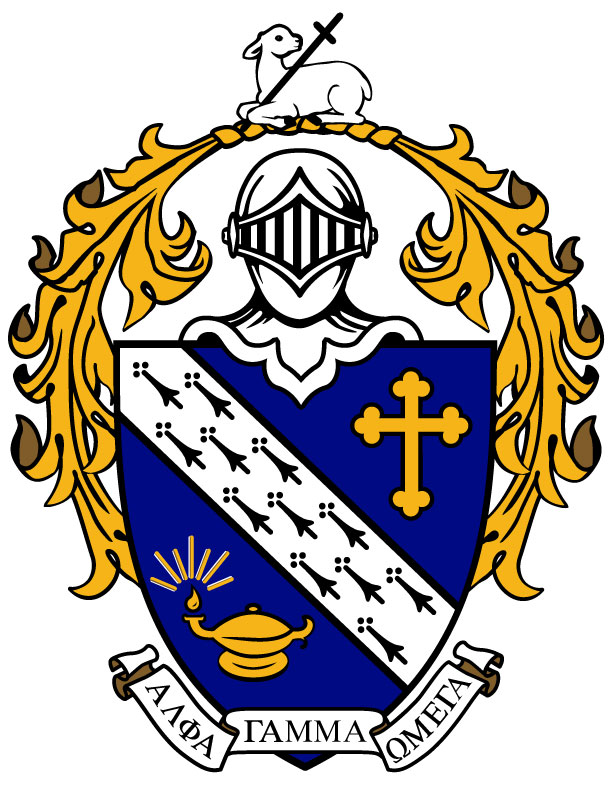
- Founded: February 25, 1927; 99 years ago University of California, Los Angeles
- Type: Social
- Affiliation: Independent
- Status: Active
- Emphasis: Christian
- Scope: National
- Motto: "Fraternity for Eternity"
- Colors: Blue and Gold
- Flower: Easter Lily
- Mascot: Medieval knight
- Chapters: 10 (active)
- Members: 1,000+ active
- Headquarters: 968 South Coastal Highway, #1927; Laguna Beach, California 92651; United States
- Website: ago.org

Alpha Gamma Omega (ΑΓΩ, or AGO) is an American Christian fraternity. It was founded in 1927 at University of California, Los Angeles and now has chapters at universities in California, Colorado, North Carolina, Pennsylvania, and Virginia.

== History ==
Alpha Gamma Omega was founded in 1927 at University of California, Los Angeles as a Christ-centered fraternity.

The preamble to the fraternity's constitution is as follows:

Believing in the Lord Jesus Christ as our personal savior, we, as Christian young men of Alpha Gamma Omega Fraternity, purpose that it shall be the aim of this fraternity to win others to a saving knowledge of Jesus Christ, to promote Christian fellowship, to present Christian ideals in word and deed, to search reverently for the truth, to uphold the traditions and ideals of the university, and to deepen the spiritual lives of the members.

Alpha Gamma Omega has chartered chapters across the United States. It maintains a close relationship with its Christian sorority counterpart, Alpha Delta Chi, considered the fraternity's "sister sorority." Its headquarters is located in Laguna Beach, California.

== Symbols ==
Alpha and Omega represent the sovereign majesty of God and His dominion and lordship over all things. These letters come from the book of Revelation, where Jesus Christ says, "I am the Alpha and the Omega, the first and the last, the beginning and the end." The letter Gamma, the third letter in the Greek alphabet, represents Christ, which itself begins with "C", the third letter of the English alphabet. It is in the center to represent Christ being at the center of the fraternity and the lives of its members.

In addition, the Greek letters ΑΓΩ spells the word "ago"

The fraternity's colors are blue and gold. Its flower is the Easter Lily. Its motto is "Fraternity for Eternity". The fraternity's Bible verse is II Timothy 2:15: "Do your best to present yourself to God as one approved, a worker who has no need to be ashamed, rightly handling the word of truth".

== Activities ==
- Founders' Day – Scheduled annually on the last Saturday of February, the active and alumni members come together to celebrate the founding of the fraternity.
- All-AGO Pismo Beach Flag Football Tournament – Every October, the Kappa chapter hosts all chapters as they compete on the Pismo-Oceano Dunes against one another in a 7 on 7 flag football tournament.
- Annual alumni camping trip to Yosemite National Park.

== Chapters ==
Following is a list of Alpha Gamma Omega chapters. Active chapters are indicated in bold. Inactive chapters are in italics.

Chapter	Charter date and range	Institution	Location	Status	Ref.
**Alpha**	1927	University of California, Los Angeles	Los Angeles, California	Active	
**Beta**	1938–1943, 1948	University of California, Berkeley	Berkeley, California	Active	
**Gamma**	1962–1967, 1978–1994, 2014	California State University, Long Beach	Long Beach, California	Active	
Delta	1964–1969	California State University, Los Angeles	Los Angeles, California	Inactive	
**Epsilon**	1965–1974, 1979	San Diego State University	San Diego, California	Active	
Zeta	1987–2020	University of California, Santa Barbara	Santa Barbara, California	Inactive	
Eta	1987–19xx ?, 2009–2020	California State University, Fresno	Fresno, California	Inactive	
Theta	1989–1992	Arizona State University	Tempe, Arizona	Inactive	
Iota	1992–-20xx ?	University of California, Davis	Davis, California	Inactive	
**Kappa**	1992	California Polytechnic State University, San Luis Obispo	San Luis Obispo, California	Active	
Lambda	1993–1996	University of California, Irvine	Irvine, California	Inactive	
Mu	1994–199x ?	Illinois State University	Normal, Illinois	Inactive	
Nu	1996–199x ?	Baylor University	Waco, Texas	Inactive	
**Xi**	1997	University of Colorado Boulder	Boulder, Colorado	Active	
**Omicron**	1999–200x ?; 2017	University of North Carolina at Charlotte	Charlotte, North Carolina	Active	
**Pi**	2001	University of Southern California	Los Angeles, California	Active	
Rho	2011–2020	Colorado State University	Fort Collins, Colorado	Inactive	
Sigma	2012–201x ?	University of California, Riverside	Riverside, California	Inactive	
**Tau**	2013	Santa Clara University	Santa Clara, California	Active	
**Upsilon**	2017	Appalachian State University	Boone, North Carolina	Active	
**Phi**	2017–2020	University of Denver	Denver, Colorado	Active	
**Chi**	2018	Liberty University	Lynchburg, Virginia	Active	
**Psi**	2018	West Chester University	West Chester, Pennsylvania	Active	
**Omega**	2019	University of Virginia's College at Wise	Wise, Virginia	Active	

== Notable members ==
- Bill Bright (Honorary), evangelist who founded Campus Crusade for Christ as a ministry for university students
- Percy Crawford (Alpha), founder of The King's College
- Harold Lindsell (Beta), founding faculty member of Fuller Theological Seminary, editor of Christianity Today
- Benjamin Weir (Beta), moderator of the General Assembly of the Presbyterian Church (USA)
- Beau Wirick (Pi), actor

== See also ==
- Christian fraternities
- List of social fraternities
