= Alpha Nu Omega =

American Christian fraternity and sorority

- ΑΝΩ
- Coat of Arms of Alpha Nu Omega
- Founded: November 3, 1988; 37 years ago Morgan State University
- Type: Christian fraternity and sorority
- Affiliation: Independent
- Status: Active
- Scope: National
- Pillars: Leadership, Integrity, Family, Education
- Colors: Navy blue, Gold and White
- Chapters: 12 active
- Colonies: 2
- Headquarters: P.O. Box 39033; Baltimore, Maryland 21212
- Website: www.alphanuomega.org

Alpha Nu Omega (ΑΝΩ) is an American collegiate Christian fraternity and sorority. It was established in 1988 at Morgan State University in Baltimore, Maryland. It has chartered 23 chapters, most at historically Black colleges and universities.

== History ==
Alpha Nu Omega was established as a coeducational organization on November 3, 1988, at Morgan State University in Baltimore, Maryland. It is a Christian fraternity and sorority with members from various Christian denominations. It was formed to "present a Christian alternative to the students and or faculty on college/university campuses, to minister to the needs of the whole person (spirit, soul, and body), and to promote an attitude of academic excellence among its members."

Alpha Nu Omega, Inc. was incorporated on December 20, 1988. It was organized with one constitution, functions as two distinct entities–a fraternity and a sorority. Doral R. Pulley was the first president of the fraternity and Joynce Mungo was the first president of the sorority.

In 1991, Alpha Nu Omega chartered a second chapter at Towson University, followed by Coppin State University in 1992. Eventually, it expanded to 23 chapters, primarily located at historically Black colleges and universities. However, membership is not limited to African American students.

Alpha Nu Omega's headquarters is located in Baltimore, Maryland.

== Symbols ==
Alpha Nu Omega's core values or pillars are leadership, integrity, family, and education. Its colors are navy blue, gold, and white.

== Activities ==
Members participate in Bible study sessions and volunteer to mentor at-risk students and to help senior citizens. Some chapters participate in step shows. Alpha Nu Omega's national philanthropy is mental health.

== Chapters ==
=== Collegiate chapters ===
Following is a list of Alpha Nu Omega collegiate chapters, with active chapters indicated in bold and inactive chapters in italics.

Chapter	Charter date and range	Institution	Location	Status	Ref.
**Alpha**	November 3, 1988	Morgan State University	Baltimore, Maryland	Active	
**Beta**	1991	Towson University	Towson, Maryland	Active	
**Gamma**	1992	Coppin State University	Baltimore, Maryland	Active	
**Delta**	1997	Delaware State University	Dover, Delaware	Active	
Epsilon	1997–20xx ?	University of Maryland Eastern Shore	Princess Anne, Maryland	Inactive	
Zeta	1999–20xx ?	California University of Pennsylvania	California, Pennsylvania	Inactive	
**Eta**	1999	Pennsylvania State University	University Park, Pennsylvania	Active	
**Theta**	1999	University of Maryland, Baltimore	Baltimore, Maryland	Active	
Iota	2000–20xx ?	American University	Washington, D.C.	Inactive	
Iota	2000–20xx ?	Georgetown University	Washington, D.C.	Inactive	
Kappa	2000–20xx ?	University of Maryland, College Park	College Park, Maryland	Inactive	
Lambda	April 7, 2003 – 20xx ?	Howard University	Washington, D.C.	Inactive	
Mu	December 12, 2003 – 20xx ?	Ohio State University	Columbus, Ohio	Inactive	
Nu	2004–20xx ?	The College of New Jersey	Ewing Township, New Jersey	Inactive	
Xi	2004–20xx ?	Rutgers University–New Brunswick	New Brunswick, New Jersey	Inactive	
**Omicron**	2006	Florida Atlantic University	Boca Raton, Florida	Active	
**Pi**	2006	Winston-Salem State University	Winston-Salem, North Carolina	Active	
Rho	2006–20xx ?	Bowie State University	Bowie, Maryland	Inactive	
Sigma	2008–20xx ?	Ball State University	Muncie, Indiana	Inactive	
**Tau**	2009	Sam Houston State University	Huntsville, Texas	Active	
**Upsilon**	2010	North Carolina State University	Raleigh, North Carolina	Active	
Phi	2010–20xx ?	Bethune–Cookman University	Daytona Beach, Florida	Inactive	
**Chi**	2016	Buffalo State University	Buffalo, New York	Active	
**Psi**	2016	Rowan University	Glassboro, New Jersey	Active	
		Norfolk State University	Norfolk, Virginia	Colony	
		North Carolina Central University	Durham, North Carolina	Colony	

=== Alumni chapters ===
Following is a list of Alpha Nu Omega alumni chapters, with active chapters indicated in bold and inactive chapters in italics.

Chapter	Charter date and range	Location	Status	Ref.
Alpha Alpha	1993	New Destiny Christian Center	Inactive	
**Greater Baltimore Alumni**	1994	Baltimore, Maryland	Active	
**Delmar Alumni**	2000	Delaware and Maryland	Active	
**Three Rivers Region Alumni**	2000	Pittsburgh, Pennsylvania	Active	
**Garden State Alumni**	2005	New Jersey	Active	
**New York Region - Wide Alumni**	2006	New York	Active	(Note: Previously known as the Empire State Alumni chapter.)
**DC Metro Alumni**	2006	Washington, D.C. Metro Area	Active	
**Philadelphia Alumni**	2008	Philadelphia, Pennsylvania	Active	
**South Florida Alumni**	2008	South Florida	Active	
**Central Florida Alumni**		Central Florida	Active	
**NC Triad-Metro Alumni**		Greensboro, Winston-Salem, and High Point, North Carolina	Active	
**NC Triangle Alumni**		Raleigh, Durham, and Chapel Hill, North Carolina	Active	
**Hampton Roads Alumni**		Hampton Roads, Virginia	Active	
**Bermuda Alumni**		Bermuda	Active	

== Notable members ==
- Jonathan McReynolds (2018, honorary) - Grammy-winning gospel musician
