= Sigma Alpha Omega =

American Christian collegiate sorority

- ΣΑΩ
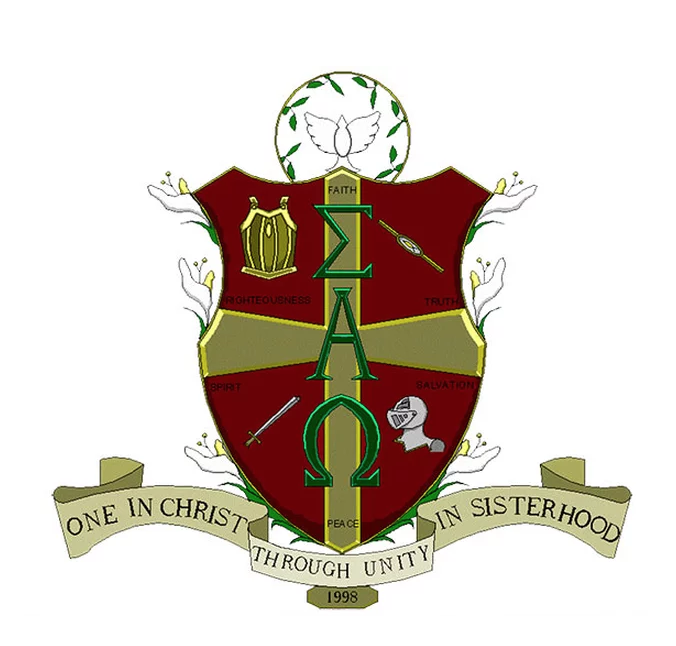
- Founded: January 5, 1998; 28 years ago North Carolina State University
- Type: Social
- Affiliation: Independent
- Status: Active
- Emphasis: Christian
- Scope: National
- Motto: "One in Christ through Unity in Sisterhood"
- Colors: Forest Green Burgundy
- Symbol: Dove
- Flower: Lily
- Publication: Dove Love
- Philanthropy: Ovarian Cancer Awareness
- Chapters: 34
- Headquarters: Germantown, Tennessee; United States
- Website: www.sigmaalphaomega.org

Sigma Alpha Omega (ΣΑΩ) is an American non-denominational Christian sorority for women. The sorority was established at North Carolina State University (NCSU) in 1998, but traces its roots back to the once co-educational Chi Alpha Omega fraternity founded at East Carolina University in 1987. The sorority was formed after a vote of active members at the NCSU chapter in 1998 and focuses on setting good moral examples for their peers and their community.

== History ==
Sigma Alpha Omega was formed as a sister sorority to Chi Alpha Omega, a Christian fraternity. Founded in 1987 at East Carolina University, Chi Alpha Omega later established a little sister program to include their sisters in Christ. Soon after, the fraternity changed fully to co-ed.

On January 5, 1998, the active brothers (both males and females) of the Beta chapter of Chi Alpha Omega at North Carolina State University voted to form Sigma Alpha Omega. Both groups are committed to living according to the ideals of Christ, uplifting each other through fellowship and service, and bringing the love of Christ to North Carolina State University. The founding sisters of Sigma Alpha Omega were Michelle Bull, Kathryn Meyer, Kimberly Rogers, and Josie Watson.

As the sorority grew, sisters of the Alpha chapter worked for three years to prepare documents to support a National Board of Trustees. In the spring of 2004, active and alumnae members of the Alpha chapter met and established a national board. The first national board of trustees consisted of alumnae members from the Alpha chapter.

Sigma Alpha Omega Christian Sorority, Inc was officially recognized as a national non-profit organization in North Carolina in June 2004. It was granted tax-exempt status by the IRS in 2014. The sorority's national headquarters is in Germantown, Tennessee.

== Symbols ==
Sigma Alpha Omega's motto is "One in Christ through Unity in Sisterhood". The sorority's official namesake Bible verses are:

- "I am the Alpha and the Omega, the First and the Last, the Beginning and the End." Revelation 22:13
- "My soul glorifies the Lord and my spirit rejoices in God my Savior." Luke 1:46-47

The official shield and crest was designed by SAO's Alpha chapter alumna and former trustee, Natasha Smith. It incorporates the Armor of God, the official colors, motto, founding year, and mascots. Its colors are burgundy and forest green. Its mascot is the dove and its flower is the lily.

Sigma Alpha Omega's publication is Dove Love.

== Philanthropy ==
On June 2, 2007, at the annual national convention, Sigma Alpha Omega recognized a need to have a unified philanthropic focus among all chapters to have a greater impact. Its members voted to adopt ovarian cancer awareness as their national philanthropy after learning of the need for awareness about this type of cancer. The individual chapters of Sigma Alpha Omega focus on awareness and education about ovarian cancer through physical and financial support.

In 2013, Sigma Alpha Omega founded Sisters by Grace, an affiliated non-profit organization established to support the sorority by providing funds and opportunities for sister development in academics, leadership, spiritual growth, and mission work. All of these activities aim to build not only sisters' relationship with each other, their families, and friends but most importantly, their relationship with Christ.

== Chapters ==
Sigma Alpha Omega has chartered more than fifty chapters and has 34 active chapters across twelve states.

== Alumnae associations ==
The sorority has a National Alumnae Association with regional committees. Previously Sigma Alpha Omega had four recognized alumnae groups at various points: the Midwest Alumnae Association, the Southeast Alumnae Association, the North Carolina Alumnae Association, and the Georgia Alumnae Association.

== See also ==
- List of social sororities and women's fraternities
