= Mu Epsilon Theta =

American service sorority

- ΜΕΘ
- Founded: January 16, 1987; 39 years ago University of Texas
- Type: Christian sorority
- Affiliation: Independent
- Status: Active
- Emphasis: Catholicism
- Scope: Local
- Motto: "Our Strength is from Above"
- Pillars: Spirituality, Service, Sisterhood
- Colors: Black, Yellow, and Silver
- Flower: Yellow rose
- Jewel: Onyx, Topaz, and Diamond
- Mascot: The Lamb
- Patron saint: Catherine Labouré
- Chapters: 1 active
- Members: 3,841+ lifetime
- Headquarters: Austin, Texas; United States
- Website: muepsilontheta.org

Mu Epsilon Theta (ΜΕΘ) is an American collegiate Catholic sorority. It was established at the University of Texas in Austin, Texas in 1987.

== History ==
Mu Epsilon Theta was founded at the University of Texas at Austin as a local sorority based on Catholic principles on October 21, 1986. It was the fourth Catholic sorority to be established in the United States. Its purpose is to promote academics, community service, leadership, and moral and spiritual well-being for female students. Its founders were Maria Alcocer, Evelyn Greenfield, and Patricia Perez.

The sorority was officially recognized at the University of Texas on January 16, 1987. Its members participated in activities such as weekly rosary prayers, monthly religious activities, and a spiritual retreat each semester.

In the spring of 1996, a colony was formed at Southwest Texas State University (now Texas State University). It was chartered as the Beta chapter in 1997. In April 2013, a colony was started at Arizona State University; it was chartered as Gamma chapter in the spring of 2015. Epsilon was chartered at Northern Arizona University in December 2015.

By 2021, the sorority had initiated 3,841 members.

== Symbols ==
The motto of Mu Epsilon Theta is "Our Strength is from Above." Its pillars are spirituality, service, and sisterhood. Its colors are black, yellow, and silver. Its mascot is the lamb and its flower is the yellow rose. Its jewels are onyx, topaz, and diamond. Its patron saint is Catherine Labouré.

== Chapters ==
Following is a list of Mu Epsilon Theta chapters. Active chapters are indicated in bold. Inactive chapters are in italics.

Chapter	Charter date and range	Institution	Location	Status	Ref.
**Alpha**	January 16, 1987	University of Texas at Austin	Austin, Texas	Active	
Beta	April 26, 1997 – 2024	Texas State University	San Marcos, Texas	Inactive	
Gamma	2015 – 20xx ?	Arizona State University	Tempe, Arizona	Inactive	
Delta	2015 ? – 20xx ?	University of North Texas and Texas Woman's University	Dallas–Fort Worth and Denton, Texas	Inactive	
Epsilon	December 5, 2015 – 20xx ?	Northern Arizona University	Flagstaff, Arizona	Inactive	
