= Alpha Delta Gamma =

American Catholic collegiate fraternity

- ΑΔΓ
- Coat of Arms of Alpha Delta Gamma
- Founded: October 10, 1924; 101 years ago Loyola University Chicago
- Type: Social
- Affiliation: NIC
- Status: Active
- Emphasis: Catholic
- Scope: National
- Motto: Γνωσθεντες εφ Φιλων "Known to Friends"
- Colors: Scarlet Red and Gold
- Flag
- Flower: Red carnation
- Mascot: Praying mantis
- Publication: Alphadelity
- Philanthropy: Habitat for Humanity
- Chapters: 8
- Nickname: ADGs, G's, Alpha Delts, Delts
- Headquarters: 946 Sanders Drive; St. Louis, Missouri 63126; United States
- Website: www.alphadeltagamma.org

Alpha Delta Gamma (ΑΔΓ), commonly known as ADG, is an American Greek-letter Catholic social fraternity and one of 75 members of the North American Interfraternity Conference (NIC). Based on Christian principles and the traditions of the Jesuit Order of the Catholic Church, Alpha Delta Gamma was founded at Loyola University Chicago on October 10, 1924, as a response to the unwillingness of most national fraternities to colonize at Catholic colleges and universities.

Since its founding, Alpha Delta Gamma has expanded conservatively to keep a small but strong brotherhood; thus, the fraternity has chartered 32 chapters in its long history. Today, Alpha Delta Gamma operates nine active chapters at private and public colleges across the United States, stretching from Los Angeles, California, to Atlanta, Georgia.

== History ==
Alpha Delta Gamma was founded at the Lake Shore campus of Loyola University Chicago on October 10, 1924, by four students: Francis Patrick Canary, John Joseph Dwyer, William S. Hallisey, and James Collins O'Brien Jr. According to the Alpha Delta Gamma National Web Site, "In effect, they wanted a fraternity founded upon Christian ideals of true manhood, sound learning, and the unity of the fraternal brotherhood. These ideals decreed the purpose of Alpha Delta Gamma when it first came into being. And so the foundation was set, Alpha Delta Gamma was on its way to becoming a city walled!"

In 1926, members of the local organization Delta Theta at Saint Louis University in St. Louis, Missouri, contacted the Alpha chapter at Loyola University Chicago, requesting permission to affiliate with the then-existing fraternity. Their request was granted and, on October 26, 1927, Alpha Delta Gamma officially charted its Beta chapter, becoming a national fraternity. The fraternity continued expanding to other Catholic colleges and universities and adopted the descriptive "National Catholic-College Fraternity." This was eventually changed to "National Catholic Social Fraternity" when the organization began expansion to non-Catholic colleges and universities.

Alpha Delta Gamma has remained a small national fraternity, granting charters to 32 collegiate chapters, nine of which are active. Most chapters are located at Catholic universities but there are no religious requirements for membership.

== Symbols ==
Alpha Delta Gamma's mottos is Γνωσθεντες εφ Φιλων or "Known to Friends". The fraternity's colors are scarlet red and gold. The fraternity's flower is the red carnation. Its mascot is the praying mantis.

The Fraternity's badge is hexagonal, in gold, which is optionally plain, beveled, or jeweled with pearls and ruby points. The base supports a black enameled field bearing the carved golden letters Α, Δ, and Γ. Members are instructed to wear the pin at a 45° angle with the appropriate chapter guard.

The pledge button is a diamond-shaped slab of gold with a bright red enamel center. Its publication is Alphadellity. Its nicknames are ADGs, G's, Alpha Delts, and Delta.

== Activities ==
A universal ADG Night is celebrated on the first Friday of December each year, commemorating the founding of the fraternity. Active chapters annually support at least one function for the benefit of orphans such as a Christmas toy drive or spring picnic.

== Chapters ==
These are nine active chapters of Alpha Delta Gamma fraternity, listed in bold. Inactive chapters are listed in italic.

Name	Charter date and range	Institution	Location	Status	Ref.
Alpha	October 10, 1924 – 2012	Loyola University Chicago	Chicago, Illinois	Inactive	
**Beta**	October 26, 1927	Saint Louis University	St. Louis, Missouri	Active	(Note: This chapter originated as Delta Theta (local) in 1925.)
Gamma	Spring 1928–1974	DePaul University	Chicago, Illinois	Inactive	
Delta	February 17, 1931–1933	Saint Mary's College of California	Moraga, California	Inactive	
Epsilon	September 10, 1932–2012	Loyola University New Orleans	New Orleans, Louisiana	Inactive	(Note: This chapter originated as Delta Phi Sigma (local) in 1924.)
Omicron Sigma; See Mu chapter	September 10, 1932–June 20, 1936; 1954–1960; 1966–200x ?	Spring Hill College	Mobile, Alabama	Inactive	(Note: This chapter originated as Omicron Sigma (local) in 1915, and was granted that name as its chapter name. The 1954 restoration came with the absorption of Phi Omega (local) but failed within a few years. The 1966 restoration came from the absorption of Alpha Delta (local), which had formed in 1965. This group took on the name Mu chapter.)
**Zeta**	September 10, 1932	Rockhurst University	Kansas City, Missouri	Active	(Note: This chapter originated as Beta Sigma Kappa (local) in 1929.)
Eta	June 14, 1947–August 29, 1960; 1966–200x ?	Quincy University	Quincy, Illinois	Inactive	
Theta	June 12, 1948–199x ?; August 14, 2010–2013	St. Norbert College	De Pere, Wisconsin	Inactive	(Note: This chapter originated as the Booster Club (local) in 1946.)
Iota	March 15, 1950–1972; 1975–19xx ?	Regis University	Denver Colorado	Inactive	
Kappa	April 18, 1950-?	Catholic University of America	Washington, D.C.	Inactive	
**Lambda**	December 6, 1952	Loyola Marymount University	Los Angeles California	Active	(Note: This chapter originated as Phi Sigma Beta (local) in 1951.)
Mu; See Omicron Sigma chapter	1954–1955; December 4, 1966–200x ?	Spring Hill College	Mobile, Alabama	Inactive	(Note: The 1954 restoration of Omicron Sigma chapter came with the absorption of Phi Omega (local) and briefly accepting the name Mu chapter, but failed within a few years. Reestablished under the Mu name with the absorption of Alpha Delta (local) in 1966.)
Nu	June 11, 1955–1974	University of San Francisco	San Francisco, California	Inactive	
**Xi**	February 26, 1961	Bellarmine University	Louisville, Kentucky	Active	
Omicron	March 17, 1963–1972	University of San Diego	San Diego, California	Inactive	
Pi	December 4, 1965–1976	Marquette University	Milwaukee, Wisconsin	Inactive	(Note: This chapter originated as Knights of the Altar (local) in 1956.)
**Rho**	April 30, 1966–199x ?; August 10, 2002	Thomas More University	Crestview Hills, Kentucky	Active	
Sigma	August 20, 1970–1974	St. Mary's University of Minnesota	Winona, Minnesota	Inactive	
Tau	March 31, 1973–200x ?	Northern Kentucky University	Highland Heights, Kentucky	Inactive	
Upsilon	August 16, 1980–1984	Saint Joseph's University	Philadelphia, Pennsylvania	Inactive	
Phi	September 26, 1987–199x ?	Merrimack College	North Andover, Massachusetts	Inactive	(Note: This chapter originated as Sigma Kappa (local), which had formed in 1985.)
Chi	August 13, 1988–199x ?	St. Cloud State University	St. Cloud, Minnesota	Inactive	
**Psi**	August 13, 1994	Barry University	Miami Shores, Florida	Active	(Note: This chapter originated as Mu Alpha Beta (local), formed earlier.)
Alpha Beta	August 8, 2004–2006	Philadelphia University	Philadelphia, Pennsylvania	Inactive	
Alpha Gamma colony	— NA	Chestnut Hill College	Philadelphia, Pennsylvania	Inactive	(Note: This colony was never installed and went dormant after its name was assigned.)
Alpha Delta	August 12, 2007-2023	Cabrini University	Radnor, Pennsylvania	Inactive	
**Alpha Epsilon**	December 2, 2007	LaGrange College	LaGrange, Georgia	Active	(Note: This chapter originated as Kappa Sigma (local).)
Alpha Zeta	February 20, 2010–April 18, 2013	York College of Pennsylvania	York, Pennsylvania	Inactive	
**Alpha Eta**	August 11, 2012	McKendree University	Lebanon, Illinois	Active	
Alpha Theta	August 10, 2013–2016	University of Texas at Austin	Austin, Texas	Inactive	
Alpha Iota	August 9, 2014-?	Felician University	Lodi, New Jersey	Inactive	
Alpha Kappa	August 6, 2016	Marian University	Indianapolis, Indiana	Inactive	
Alpha Lambda	2017–2018	Clarkson University	Potsdam, New York	Inactive	

== Notable members ==
These names and additional famous Alpha Delts are listed on the Alpha Delta Gamma National Fraternity website.

- Benjamin Bok - Dutch chess grandmaster (Beta chapter)
- Pascal F. Calogero Jr. – chief justice of the Louisiana Supreme Court (Epsilon chapter)
- Joseph Paul Clayton – former president and CEO of DISH Network Corporation, former CEO of Sirius Satellite Radio, president and CEO of Frontier Communications (Xi chapter)
- Edward Derwinski – former United States Congressman from Illinois; first United States Secretary of Veterans Affairs (Alpha chapter)
- John (Jack) Grundhoffer – former CEO and chairman of US Bank (Lambda chapter)
- Nathan H. Lents – scientist, author, science communicator (Beta chapter)
- Walter J. Ong – Jesuit, cultural and religious philosopher, historian (Zeta chapter)
- Michael R. Quinlan – former chairman and CEO of McDonald's Corp. (Alpha chapter)
- Richard G. Thomas – chief test pilot Tacit Blue/ Area 51 Northrop Corporation (Beta chapter)
- Patrick Wayne – actor (Lambda chapter)
- Hunter Wendelstedt – Major League Baseball umpire (Epsilon chapter)
- Harry Wiggins – former State Senator of Missouri (Zeta chapter)
- Phil Woolpert – head basketball coach, University of San Francisco Dons (Lambda chapter)
- J. Skelly Wright – judge, United States Court of Appeals for the District of Columbia Circuit (Epsilon chapter)

=== Notable honorary members ===
- George Brett – Hall of Fame baseball player
- de Lesseps Story Morrison – mayor of New Orleans and ambassador to the Organization of American States
- Babe Ruth – Hall of Fame baseball player
- Carl Sandburg – poet
- Victor H. Schiro – mayor of New Orleans
- Harry S. Truman –President of the United States of America

== See also ==
- List of social fraternities
