= Phi Beta Chi =

American Lutheran collegiate sorority

- ΦΒΧ
- Founded: March 26, 1978; 48 years ago University of Illinois at Urbana–Champaign
- Type: Social
- Affiliation: Independent
- Status: Active
- Emphasis: Lutheran heritage
- Scope: National
- Motto: Amor Via Vitae in Christo "Love through Life in Christ"
- Pillars: Chapter, Community, Church
- Colors: Azure blue and white
- Symbol: Ellipse
- Flower: White Rose of Sharon
- Mascot: white lamb
- Philanthropy: AbleLight and the YMCA
- Chapters: 3 active
- Nickname: Beta Chi
- Headquarters: P.O. Box 2036; West Lafayette, Indiana 47906; United States
- Website: www.phibetachi.org

Phi Beta Chi (ΦΒΧ) is an American national college sorority. Phi Beta Chi was founded in 1978 at the University of Illinois Urbana-Champaign on Christian values. Although not exclusively for Christians, Phi Beta Chi celebrates Lutheran heritage. The sorority has chartered 24 chapters across the United States.

== History ==
Phi Beta Chi was founded on March 26, 1978 at the University of Illinois Urbana-Champaign. At inception, it was formed as a collegiate Christian sorority to support collegiate women socially, spiritually, and academically. Founders were of Lutheran Church heritage. Its creed states, "We, the sisters of Phi Beta chi, shall strive to be faithful and energetic Christian leaders and shall celebrare the Luterhan Heritage in all of our activities..." However, the members of Phi Beta Chi are not required to be Christians or of a specific religious demonimation.

A second chapter, Beta, was established at Purdue University in 1980. This was followed by chapters at Eastern Illinois University, University of Missouri, University of Nebraska at Kearney, and Texas A&M University in the 1980s. The sorority's first chapter outside of the Midwestern United States was established at the University of North Carolina at Chapel Hill on August 23, 1997, and was chartered on January 22, 2000. Further expansions spread the sorority west to California and Colorado, and north to New York and Pennsylvania.

The Rose of Sharon Education Foundation was established as a nonprofit organization that supports Phi Beta Chi with awards and scholarships. The sorority's national philanthropy is AbleLight and the YMCA.

Phi Beta Chi's headquarters are in West Lafayette, Indiana.

== Symbols ==
The motto of Phi Beta Chi is Amor Via Vitae in Christo or "Love through Life in Christ". The sorority's pillars or its 3Cs are Chapter, Community and Church. Its song is "Now A Rose".

Phi Beta Chi's colors are azure blue and white. Its symbol is the ellipse. The sorority's mascot is a white lamb. Its flower is the white Rose of Sharon. Its nickname is Beta Chi.

== Chapters ==
=== Collegiate chapters ===
In the following list of Phi Beta Chi's collegiate chapters, active chapters are noted in bold and inactive chapters are in italics.

Chapter	Charter date and range	Institution	Location	Status	Ref.
Alpha	March 26, 1978 –200x ?	University of Illinois Urbana-Champaign	Urbana, Illinois	Inactive	
**Beta**	1980	Purdue University	West Lafayette, Indiana	Active	
Gamma	1982–xxxx ?	Eastern Illinois University	Charleston, Illinois	Inactive	
Delta	198x?–xxxx?	University of Missouri	Columbia, Missouri	Inactive	
Epsilon	1986–xxxx?	University of Nebraska at Kearney	Kearney, Nebraska	Inactive	
**Zeta**	1986	Texas A&M University	College Station, Texas	Active	
Eta	199x ?–xxxx?	Northern Illinois University	DeKalb, Illinois	Inactive	
Theta	1992–2019	University of Nebraska–Lincoln	Lincoln, Nebraska	Inactive	
Iota	1994–2020	Iowa State University	Ames, Iowa	Inactive	
**Kappa**	January 22, 2000	University of North Carolina at Chapel Hill	Chapel Hill, North Carolina	Active	
Lambda	200x ?–20xx ?	Chapman University	Orange, California	Inactive	
Mu	2003–20xx ?	Wake Forest University	Winston-Salem, North Carolina	Inactive	
Nu	200x ?–20xx ?	Concordia College	Bronxville, New York	Inactive	
Xi	2002–201x ?	Sam Houston State University	Huntsville, Texas	Inactive	
Omicron	2003–20xx ?	University of Tennessee at Chattanooga	Chattanooga, Tennessee	Inactive	
Pi	2003–201x ?	Texas State University	San Marcos, Texas	Inactive	
Rho	September 9, 2001–20xx ?	University of Southern California	Los Angeles, California	Inactive	
Sigma	20xx ?–20xx ?	University of Colorado Colorado Springs	Colorado Springs, Colorado	Inactive	
Tau	2010 – 202x ?	East Carolina University	Greenville, North Carolina	Inactive	
Upsilon	2008 ?–20xx ?	University of Arizona	Tucson, Arizona	Inactive	
Phi	2009–20xx ?	University of Delaware	Newark, Delaware	Inactive	
Chi	2013–2020	University of Iowa	Iowa City, Iowa	Inactive	
Psi	2015–2019	University of Minnesota	Minneapolis, Minnesota	Inactive	
Omega	2017–202x ?	University of Pittsburgh at Bradford	Bradford, Pennsylvania	Inactive	

=== Alumnae chapters ===
In the following list of Phi Beta Chi's alumnae chapters, active chapters are noted in bold and inactive chapters are in italics.

Chapter	Charter date and range	Location	Status	Ref.
**Central Illinois Alumnae Chapter**		Illinois	Active	
**North Carolina Alumnae Chapter**	August 1, 2020	North Carolina	Active	
**Northern Illinois Alumnae Chapter**		Illinois	Active	

== See also ==
- Christian sorority (fraternities and sororities)
- List of social sororities and women's fraternities
