= Christian fraternities =

Religious social organization for men

While the traditional college fraternity is a well-established mainstay across the United States at institutions of higher learning. Alternatives – in the form of social fraternities that require doctrinal and behavioral conformity to the Christian faith – did not begin to be common until the early 20th century. They continue to grow in size and popularity, both as collegiate and community-based organizations.

== History ==
In the 19th century, there were several Catholic collegiate fraternities such as Phi Kappa, which was established in 1889 at Brown University. In the early part of the 20th century, Christian fraternities began to appear on college campus, often affiliated with a specific branch of Protestantism, such as Methodist or Lutheran. The three largest were Beta Sigma Psi (1925), Alpha Gamma Omega (1927), and Sigma Theta Epsilon (1941), which are all still active.

=== Beta Sigma Psi ===
Beta Sigma Psi was founded as a national fraternity for Lutheran students in 1925 at the University of Illinois, home to the largest fraternity and sorority system in the United States. The fraternity had its origins in the concerns of Rev. Frederick William Gustav Stiegemeyer, the son of a Lutheran pastor, who had been entrusted with the spiritual care of Lutheran students at the university. In the fall of 1919, he organized the Lutheran Illini League with a nucleus of ten students. At that time, they intended to meet once or twice a week for religious instruction and discussion on contemporary issues. In the fall of 1920, now with twenty members, the Lutheran Illini League rented a house. In early 1921, it reorganized as the Concordia Club. By 1923, the group regularly participated in campus activities; so much so that they began being referred to as the Concordia Fraternity. On April 17, 1925, incorporation papers were filed for Beta Sigma Psi National Lutheran Fraternity in Springfield, Illinois. By 1970, Beta Sigma Psi had grown to eighteen chapters. The fraternity had ten active chapters as of 2016.

=== Alpha Gamma Omega ===
Alpha Gamma Omega was established in 1927 at the University of California, Los Angeles. The fraternity suffered a decline in chapters and membership before experiencing extensive national growth starting in 1987. As of 2020, it had sixteen active chapters.

=== Sigma Theta Epsilon ===
Sigma Theta Epsilon was formed in 1941 from the merger of two Methodist-affiliated fraternities: Phi Tau Theta, founded in 1925, and Sigma Epsilon Theta, founded in 1936 at Indiana University. The merged fraternity was initially called Delta Sigma Theta, but the name was changed to Sigma Theta Epsilon in 1949 when a national sorority Delta Sigma Theta that was already using the name threatened legal action.

By the late 1950s, Sigma Theta Epsilon had grown to over twenty chapters. However, its numbers began to decline at the end of the 1960s. The fraternity became non-denominational in 1968. Down to only three chapters by the 1980s, Sigma Theta Epsilon began chartering new chapters again in 1988. The fraternity had twelve active chapters during the 2000s, but as of 2016 had only three active chapters. It ceased operations in 2022.

=== Texas movement ===
At the same time that the historic Christian fraternities were beginning to rebound from their declining numbers, other groups of Christian fraternities developed, with the rise of the Evangelical Christian movement in Texas in the late 20th century. Beta Upsilon Chi began in 1985 on the campus of the University of Texas at Austin as a local Christian fraternity and expanded when students at neighboring Texas schools convinced the founders to open new chapters. As of 2017, it is the largest Christian fraternity in the United States.

Beta Upsilon Chi directly led to the founding of four other Christian collegiate fraternities. The second largest Christian fraternity in the United States, Alpha Nu Omega, was founded three years later at Morgan State University. It was followed by Gamma Phi Delta at the University of Texas at Austin in 1988, while Kappa Upsilon Chi was founded in 1993 on the campus of Texas Tech University. Kappa Upsilon Chi was founded by four men who led Christian college ministries and wanted to create an alternative fraternity for Christian men. Its first pledge class contained some former members of Phi Gamma Delta social fraternity. While its founders originally had no intentions of expanding, the fraternity grew to include seven chapters.

=== Christian-branded chapters ===
Some non-religious national social fraternities allow individual chapters to brand themselves with unique ideals conforming to the specific interests of the local members. Instances have arisen in which a singular chapter of an IFC-affiliated social fraternity brands itself a Christian chapter and initiates members based on national membership standards as well as religious beliefs. One of the oldest such chapters is the Beta Alpha chapter of Theta Xi fraternity at Georgia Tech, which marked itself Christian in 1974. The chapter operates as a full social fraternity and member of IFC while pursuing Biblical masculinity and Christian brotherhood. The Beta Alpha chapter is currently the only Christian chapter of a secular fraternity. It expanded this model to a second chapter at Georgia Southern University; however, that chapter has since reverted to a non-religious chapter.

== Legal challenges ==
=== Alpha Iota Omega ===
Alpha Iota Omega and the University of North Carolina clashed over the university's anti-discrimination policy. The fraternity refused to agree to the policy, which banned religious discrimination. As a result, Alpha Iota Omega was not officially recognized by the university for the 2003–2004 academic year. The fraternity sought assistance from the Foundation for Individual Rights in Education, a civil liberties group, and the Alliance Defense Fund, an American legal alliance defending religious liberties. A lawsuit was filed in the United States District Court for the Middle District of North Carolina on August 25, 2004, citing the incident in the fall of 2003 when UNC administrator Jonathan Curtis refused to extend the benefits of official recognition to AIO. The group received temporary reinstatement in the spring of 2005.

=== Beta Upsilon Chi ===
In late 2006, the Pi chapter of Beta Upsilon Chi at the University of Georgia was not recognized as a student organization by university officials "because the group requires its members and officers to share the group's Christian beliefs." After months of negotiation between university officials, student officers of the local chapter and officials at the fraternity's national headquarters in Texas, attorneys with the Christian Legal Society and Alliance Defense Fund filed a civil rights suit on December 6, 2006, in federal court against the university on behalf of Beta Upsilon Chi. On December 7, 2006, the Atlanta Journal-Constitution reported that the university would remove the religion clause from its anti-discrimination policy.

== List of Christian fraternities ==
| Fraternity | Symbols | Chartered | Founding location | Scope | Type | Secondary emphasis | Active chapters | Status | Ref. |
|---|---|---|---|---|---|---|---|---|---|
| Alpha Delta Gamma | ΑΔΓ | October 10, 1924 | Loyola University Chicago | National | Collegiate | Jesuit, social | 12 | Active | |
| Alpha Gamma Omega | ΑΓΩ | February 25, 1927 | University of California, Los Angeles | National | Collegiate | | 15 | Active | |
| Alpha Iota Omega | ΑΙΩ | 1999 | University of North Carolina at Chapel Hill | Local | Collegiate | | 1 | Active | |
| Alpha Nu Omega | ΑΝΩ | November 3, 1988 | Morgan State University | National | Collegiate | African American, fraternity and sorority | 23 | Active | |
| Alpha Omega | ΑΩ | 1998 | Young Harris College | Regional | Collegiate | | 7 | Active | |
| Alpha Omega | ΑΩ | 1994 | Western Michigan University | National | Collegiate | African American, coed | 8 | Active | |
| Alpha Omega Theta | ΑΩΘ | July 16, 2002 | St. Louis, Missouri. | Regional | Collegiate | | 6 | Active | |
| Beta Alpha Gamma | ΒΑΓ | May 26, 2018 | Illinois | Local | Community-based | African American | 1 | Active | |
| Beta Sigma Psi | ΒΣΨ | April 17, 1925 | University of Illinois Urbana-Champaign | National | Collegiate | Lutheran | 12 | Active | |
| Beta Sigma Theta | ΒΣΘ | 1973 | Michigan Technological University | Local | Collegiate | | 1 | Active | |
| Beta Tau Theta | ΒΤΘ | 19xx ?–1925 | Pennsylvania State College | Local | Collegiate | Methodist | 0 | Merged | (Note: Merged to form Phi Tau Theta) |
| Beta Upsilon Chi | ΒΥΧ | April 27, 1985 | University of Texas | National | Collegiate | | 37 | Active | |
| Chi Alpha Omega | ΧΑΩ | April 1, 1987 | East Carolina University | Regional | Collegiate | | 9 | Active | |
| Chi Omicron Rho | ΧΟΡ | 2017 | Pittsburg State University | Local | Collegiate | | 1 | Active | |
| Delta Nu Omega | ΔΝΩ | December 27, 2015 | Broward County, Florida | Local | Community-based | African American, professional men | 1 | Active | |
| Delta Phi Xi | ΔΦΞ | December 2007 | Tarleton State University | Local | Collegiate | | 0 | Inactive | |
| Gamma Phi Delta | ΓΦΔ | March 21, 1988 | University of Texas at Austin | National | Collegiate | African American | 18 | Active | |
| Gamma Phi Lambda | ΓΦΛ | 202x ? | Morton, Mississippi | Local | Community-based | | | Active | |
| Gamma Psi Lambda | ΓΨΛ | October 21, 1999 | Fort Valley State University | National | Collegiate | African American, coed | 8 | Active | |
| Kappa Phi Epsilon | ΚΦΕ | 2004 | University of Florida | Local | Collegiate | | 1 | Active | |
| Kappa Upsilon Chi | ΚΥΧ | 1993 | Texas Tech University | National | Collegiate | | 7 | Active | |
| Lambda Sigma Phi | ΛΣΦ | 2000 | University of Alabama | Regional | Collegiate | | 2 | Active | |
| Megisté Areté Christian Fraternity | MA | 1989 | Illinois State University | Regional | Collegiate | African American | 10 | Active | |
| Men of God | M.O.G. | 1999 | Texas Tech University | Regional | Collegiate | African American | 5 | Active | (Note: Founded by a group of men who talked about God at a Step Show. MOG performs a yearly Step Show filled with mimes, dancers, and singers in honor of its beginning. MOG has grown but prefers to remain small, limiting the number of members in each chapter.) |
| Mu Omicron Gamma | ΜΟΓ | September 9, 2001 | Old Dominion University | Regional | Collegiate | African American | 3 | Active | |
| Mu Sigma Chi | ΜΣΧ | October 24, 2008 | Ferrum College | Local | Collegiate | | 1 | Active | |
| Nu Alpha Omega | ΝΑΩ | 2020 | United States | Local | Community-based | African American | 0 | Inactive | |
| Omega Kappa Psi | ΩΚΨ | 1995–1997, 2017 | University of North Carolina at Charlotte | Local | Collegiate | African American | 1 | Active | |
| Phi Alpha Kappa | ΦΑΚ | 1929 | Calvin College | Local | Collegiate | Non-sectarian | 1 | Active | |
| Phi Kappa (see Phi Kappa Sigma) | ΦΚ | 1900 – April 29, 1959 | Brown University | National | Collegiate | Catholic | 0 | Merged | (Note: It was called Phi Kappa Sigma from 1889 until 1900, after the discovery of an older society with the same name. It formed 40 chapters before merging with Theta Kappa Phi to form Phi Kappa Theta.) |
| Phi Kappa Chi | ΦΚΧ | 1988 | Baylor University | Local | Collegiate | | 1 | Active | |
| Phi Kappa Sigma (see Phi Kappa) | ΦΚ | October 1, 1889 – 1900 | Brown University | Local | Collegiate | Catholic | 0 | Renamed | (Note: Predecessor of Phi Kappa.) |
| Phi Kappa Theta | ΦΚΘ | April 29, 1959 | Ohio State University | National | Collegiate | Non-denominational | 57 | Active | (Note: Founded by the merger of the Catholic fraternities, Phi Kappa and Theta Kappa Phi. However, it is no longer just for Catholics.) |
| Phi Lambda Phi | ΦΛΦ | 19xx ?–1925 | University of South Dakota | Local | Collegiate | Methodist | 0 | Merged | |
| Phi Tau Theta | ΦΤΘ | 1925–1941 | Lincoln, Nebraska | National | Collegiate | Methodist | 0 | Merged | (Note: Merged with Sigma Epsilon Theta to form Delta Sigma Theta in 19,41 which changed to Sigma Theta Epsilon in 1949.) |
| Sigma Epsilon Theta | ΣΕΘ | 1936–1941 | Indiana University | Local | Collegiate | Methodist | 0 | Merged | (Note: Merged with Phi Tau Theta in 1941 to form Delta Sigma Theta, which changed to Sigma Theta Epsilon in 1949.) |
| Sigma Kappa Lambda | ΣΚΛ | June 29, 2014 | Birmingham, Alabama | Local | Community-based | African American | 1 | Active | |
| Sigma Theta Epsilon | ΣΘΕ | 1941–2022 | Cedar Falls, Iowa | National | Collegiate | Non-denominational | 0 | Inactive | (Note: Founded by merging two local Methodist-affiliated fraternities, Phi Tau Theta and Sigma Epsilon Theta. Originally called Delta Sigma Theta, but its name was changed to Sigma Theta Epsilon in 1949. Became non-denominational in 1969. It had established 47 chapters before ceasing its operations.) |
| Tau Alpha Gamma | ΤΑΓ | 2007 | United States | | | African American | 0 | Inactive | |
| Theta Kappa Phi | ΘΚΦ | October 1919 – April 1959 | Lehigh University | National | Collegiate | Catholic, social | 0 | Merged | (Note: Catholic social fraternity that merged with Phi Kappa to form Phi Kappa Theta) |
| Xi Upsilon Gamma | ΞΥΓ | 2022–2026 | United States | Local | Community-based | African American | 0 | Merged | (Note: Merged with Gamma Phi Lambda.) |
| Zeta Phi Zeta | ΖΦΖ | April 11, 2001 | Chicago, Illinois | Local | Collegiate | African American, fraternity and sorority | | Active | |

== See also ==
- Christian sororities
- Cultural interest fraternities and sororities
- List of social fraternities and sororities
- Knights of Columbus
