= AbleLight =

Organization serving people with intellectual and developmental disabilities

- Formerly: Bethesda Lutheran Home; Bethesda Lutheran Homes and Services; Bethesda Lutheran Communities
- Type: Nonprofit
- Industry: Human services
- Founded: 1904
- Headquarters: Watertown, Wisconsin, United States
- Area served: California; Colorado; Illinois; Indiana; Kansas; Michigan; Minnesota; Missouri; Oregon; Washington; Wisconsin
- Key people: Keith Jones, President and CEO
- Revenue: 121,004,059 United States dollar (2017)
- Total assets: 188,871,302 United States dollar (2022)
- Website: www.ablelight.org

AbleLight, formerly known as Bethesda Lutheran Communities, is a non-profit human service organization serving people with intellectual and developmental disabilities through faith-based programs. AbleLight, a 501(c)3 non-profit, has provided support to over 2,000 people with intellectual and developmental disabilities and their families in 11 states including California, Colorado, Illinois, Indiana, Kansas, Michigan, Minnesota, Missouri, Oregon, Washington, and Wisconsin. The organization is headquartered in Watertown, Wisconsin.

== History ==
Bethesda was founded on April 13, 1904, in Watertown, Wisconsin, by Children’s Friends Societies from seven Midwestern states. The organization was originally named "The Society for the Training and Care of the Feeble-minded and Epileptic". The five people originally supported by the organization moved into rented quarters in Watertown.

In 1906, the organization had grown to serve 14 people, but lost its lease. It relocated to a small vacant sanitarium in Milwaukee, Wisconsin, for 2½ years and grew to serve a clientele of 40 people. Having outgrown its Milwaukee location, the organization returned to Watertown in 1909, where the first permanent building was located on farmland along the banks of the Rock River. Above the main entrance to that building was placed a stone inscribed with a single word, “Bethesda”. The word is Hebrew for “House of Mercy” and is taken from a story of healing in the fifth chapter of the Gospel of John. The name of the organization was not officially changed to Bethesda Lutheran Home until 1924.

The original building quickly filled and others were built to accommodate a growing need for space. Through the first 40 years of its existence, Bethesda made use of the surrounding farmland and orchards to provide much of its own food. Many of the residents provided the necessary labor.

=== 1970s ===
By the early 1970s, the number of people with intellectual and developmental disabilities living at the institution had grown to 660. In response to this large number of people, along with the growing level of individual needs, the board of directors and administration began to seek more appropriate living settings for many people. For others, they began to explore the possibility of establishing group homes away from Watertown and closer to people’s families. In 1977, the first Bethesda group home was established in Maryville, Missouri. The establishment of additional homes in other states followed.

=== 1980–2010 ===
The 1980s and 1990s were marked by significant expansion of services in a number of states. In two locations, Kansas and Texas, Bethesda acquired existing programs that were facing financial difficulties. Both programs are functioning and still expanding today. In Illinois, a number of new homes were constructed.

In the early 1980s, Bethesda established the National Christian Resource Center (NCRC). The NCRC provides outreach services beyond the individuals it supports. For 25 years, the NCRC produced religious education materials for churches; staff training materials for other service providers; referral information to parents, teachers and pastors; and scholarship and award programs for grade school, high school and college students. In 2009, the NCRC gave way to the Bethesda Institute, which has become the primary outreach division of Bethesda Lutheran Communities. The Institute is planned to provide consultation, research, professional training, and leadership development in the field of intellectual and developmental disabilities.

In recognition of its broadened role in producing outreach materials and services beyond its single location in Watertown, Bethesda's Board of Directors made the decision in 1992 to change the name of the organization to Bethesda Lutheran Homes and Services, Inc. In 2004, Bethesda opened a new corporate headquarters building.

=== Good Shepherd Communities ===
In 2006, Bethesda became a nationwide organization when Good Shepherd Communities (GSC) became a wholly controlled subsidiary of the organization. The histories of the two agencies had been intertwined since GSC’s inception. In 1949, Norma and Paul Yorde traveled from California to Watertown, Wisconsin, to inquire about placing their son on a waiting list for admission to Bethesda. Bethesda was unable to admit their son but offered the Yordes assistance in developing a program for people with disabilities on the west coast.

The Good Shepherd Lutheran Home of the West was established in Terra Bella, California, with Bethesda providing assistance to help the organization get started and, in the 1970s, the two agencies partnered on a successful joint fundraising initiative.

In November 2008, Bethesda’s Board of Directors made the recommendation to formally merge with Good Shepherd Communities, effective September 1, 2009. That recommendation was preceded by a year-long study of Bethesda’s mission, vision, and values with relation to the strength of its identity. The merger of Bethesda and GSC was approved in May 2009, and on September 1, 2009, the single organization became known as Bethesda Lutheran Communities.

=== 2020s ===
In 2021, Raleigh, North Carolina–based Broadstep Behavioral Health, a portfolio company within the Double Impact fund of Bain Capital, acquired Bethesda Lutheran Communities' residential and support programs in Illinois, Indiana, and Wisconsin.

On January 10, 2022, Bethesda changed its name to AbleLight, in part to distinguish it from other organizations with Bethesda in their names.

== Programs ==
As of 2026, AbleLight supports individuals through hundreds of programs across 11 states including California, Colorado, Illinois, Indiana, Kansas, Michigan, Minnesota, Missouri, Oregon, Washington, and Wisconsin. Programs vary by region. Most people served by AbleLight receive residential supports through group homes, shared living arrangements, and supported living. AbleLight also offers adult day program services in Colorado and Kansas, providing people with intellectual and developmental disabilities opportunities for community engagement, social connection, and personal development.

=== Employment supports ===
AbleLight assists people with intellectual and developmental disabilities find career opportunities in California and Colorado. Employment staff evaluate individuals and help them navigate the hiring process. AbleLight also works with employers who are looking for staff. AbleLight also employs people with developmental disabilities at each of its 12 thrift shops across the midwest.

=== AbleLight College ===
AbleLight previously operated the AbleLight College of Applied Learning, a two-year post-secondary certificate program where students with intellectual and developmental disabilities can participate in college education. Students enrolled in AbleLight College lived in integrated residence halls on the Concordia University Wisconsin campus in Mequon. The program was assumed by Concordia University in 2024 under the name Hesed.

=== Camp Matz ===
Bethesda previously operated Camp Matz, a fully accessible camp for people with disabilities, staffed by volunteers from the Lutheran Church–Missouri Synod’s Servant Event program. The camp was home to the only fully wheelchair accessible treehouse in the Midwest. Camp operations were discontinued prior to the organization’s name change to AbleLight.

== Chief executive officers ==
- 1975-1998: Alex Napolitano
- 1998-2008: David Geske
- 2008-2014: John Bauer
- 2014–2021: Mike Thirtle
- 2021-2022: Dave Sneddon (interim)
- 2022-Present: Keith Jones

== See also ==
- Lutheran Services in America
- American Association on Intellectual and Developmental Disabilities
