= Chi Alpha Omega =

Christian fraternity founded at East Carolina University

- ΧΑΩ
- Founded: April 1, 1987; 38 years ago East Carolina University
- Type: Social
- Affiliation: Independent
- Status: Active
- Emphasis: Christian
- Scope: Regional
- Colors: Purple and Gold
- Chapters: 9
- Headquarters: , North Carolina; United States
- Website: www.chialphaomega.net

Chi Alpha Omega (ΧΑΩ) is an American coeducational Christian fraternity founded in 1987 at East Carolina University. It is composed of seven chapters in North Carolina, one chapter in South Carolina, and one chapter in Georgia.

== History ==
On April 1, 1987, Chi Alpha Omega Fraternity was founded by sixteen students at East Carolina University in Greenville, North Carolina. Chi Alpha Omega was established "to assemble Christian students in a Christ-centered brotherhood in order to enjoy Christian fellowship, service, accountability, and social activities".

The original group became Alpha chapter and was co-educational Christian fraternity. Beta chapter was founded by a member who transferred to North Carolina State University in Raleigh, North Carolina in 1988. The fraternity's growth continued with the addition of the Gamma chapter at the University of North Carolina in Chapel Hill, North Carolina in August 1994.

In the spring of 1995, Beta chapter at N.C. State became the flagship chapter, overseeing the affairs of the national organization. Under their leadership, a movement to unify by-laws and ritual across the organization was made. In the spring of 1996, the National Constitution Committee developed a new constitution that all chapters ratified.

In 1998, the Beta chapter at North Carolina State University voted to form a sorority that would work with Chi Alpha Omega. This sorority is the second largest Christian sorority in the nation and is called Sigma Alpha Omega.

In 2005, the East Carolina University chapter reestablished.

== Symbols and traditions ==
The fraternities colors are purple and gold. Pledges are required to carry bricks that are inscribed with verses from the Bible.

== Activities ==
Chapters hold weekly Bible study and alcohol-free parties.

== Chapters ==
Following is a list of Chi Alpha Omega chapters.

Chapter	Charter date and range	Institution	Location	Status	Ref.
Alpha	April 1, 1987 – 1995; 2005	East Carolina University	Greenville, North Carolina	Active	
Beta	Spring 1988	North Carolina State University	Raleigh, North Carolina	Active	
Gamma	August 26, 1994	University of North Carolina at Chapel Hill	Chapel Hill, North Carolina	Active	
Delta	Spring 2002	Appalachian State University	Boone, North Carolina	Active	
Epsilon	Fall 2003	University of North Carolina at Greensboro	Greensboro, North Carolina	Active	
Zeta	Fall 2005	Lander University	Greenwood, South Carolina	Inactive	
Eta	Spring 2006	Campbell University	Buies Creek, North Carolina	Active	
Theta	Spring 2007	Western Carolina University	Cullowhee, North Carolina	Active	
Iota	Fall 2007	University of West Georgia	Carrollton, Georgia	Active	
