= Alpha Lambda Omega =

American Christian collegiate sorority

- ΑΛΩ
- Founded: April 9, 1990; 36 years ago University of Texas at Austin
- Type: Social
- Affiliation: Independent
- Status: Active
- Emphasis: Christianity
- Scope: National
- Colors: Scarlet and Purple
- Symbol: The Sheep
- Flower: The Lily
- Chapters: 16
- Members: 1000+ active
- Headquarters: P.O Box 14525; Houston, Texas 77221-4525; United States
- Website: www.alocs.org

Alpha Lambda Omega Christian Sorority, Incorporated (ΑΛΩ) is an African American inter-denominational Christian sorority. It was founded on April 9, 1990, by four students at the University of Texas at Austin. The sorority consists of sixteen chapters in the states of Texas, Pennsylvania, Michigan, and Oklahoma. It is governed by a national executive board in the headquarters in Houston, Texas.

== History ==
Alpha Lambda Omega was founded on April 9, 1990, by four students at the University of Texas at Austin. Its founders include Terra Delaney, Tyesha Elam, Amanda Tezeno, and Dawn Walton.

This non-denominational Christian sorority initially expanded to other universities in Texas. As of 2018, it has grown to include sixteen chapters in Texas, Pennsylvania, Michigan, and Oklahoma. It is governed by a national executive board in the headquarters in Houston, Texas.

Gamma Phi Delta Christian Fraternity is the sorority's brother organization.

== Symbols ==
The sorority's colors are scarlet and purple. Its symbol is the sheep and its flower is the lily.

== Chapters ==
=== Collegiate chapters ===
The collegiate chapters of Alpha Lambda Omega follow. Active chapters are indicated in bold. Inactive chapters are in italics.

| Chapter | Charter date and range | Institution | Location | Status | Ref. |
|---|---|---|---|---|---|
| Alpha Genesis | April 9, 1990 | University of Texas at Austin | Austin, Texas | Active | |
| Beta Exodus | | Prairie View A&M University | Prairie View, Texas | Active | |
| Gamma Levitcus | | Texas A&M University | College Station, Texas | Active | |
| Delta Numbers | | Sam Houston State University | Huntsville, Texas | Active | |
| Epsilon Deuteronomy | | Langston University | Langston, Oklahoma | Active | |
| Zeta Joshua | | Texas State University | San Marcos, Texas | Active | |
| Eta Judges | | Stephen F. Austin State University | Nacogdoches, Texas | Active | |
| Theta Ruth | | University of Texas at Arlington | Arlington, Texas | Active | |
| Iota Samuel | | University of Pittsburgh | Pittsburgh, Pennsylvania | Active | |
| Kappa Samuel | | Lamar University | Beaumont, Texas | Active | |
| Lambda Kings | | Baylor University | Waco, Texas | Active | |
| Mu Kings | | Texas Tech University | Lubbock, Texas | Active | |
| Nu Chronicles | | Texas Southern University | Houston, Texas | Active | |
| Xi Chronicles | | Central Michigan University | Mount Pleasant, Michigan | Active | |
| Omicron Ezra | | Michigan State University | East Lansing, Michigan | Active | |
| Pi Nehemiah | | University of Houston | Houston, Texas | Active | |

=== Alumni chapters ===
The alumni chapters of Alpha Lambda Omega are as follows.

| Chapter | Charter date | Location | Status | Ref. |
|---|---|---|---|---|
| **Beaumont, TX Colony** | | Beaumont, Texas | Active | |
| **Greater Houston Area Colony** | | Greater Houston, Texas | Active | |
