= Christian Legal Society =

American non-profit organization

- Abbreviation: CLS
- Formation: 1961
- Type: Christian non-governmental organization
- Headquarters: 8001 Braddock Rd Ste 302
- Location: Springfield, Virginia, United States
- President: Charlie Oellermann (President & Chairman of the Board)
- Staff: David Nammo; (Executive Director & CEO); Brian Patlen; (COO); Peter Smith; (CFO)
- Website: christianlegalsociety.org

Christian Legal Society (CLS) is a non-profit Christian organization headquartered in Virginia, United States. The organization consists of lawyers, judges, law professors, and law students. Its members are bound to follow the "commandment of Jesus" and to "seek justice with the love of God."

== History ==
The organization was founded in Chicago, Illinois, in 1961 by four lawyers (Paul Bernard, Gerrit P. Groen, Henry Luke Brinks, and Elmer Johnson) who met to pray together at a 1959 convention of the American Bar Association.

In the 1980s and 1990s, the organization formed a Christian Conciliation Ministry, which later became Peacemaker Ministries and the Institute for Christian Conciliation.

Currently, there are over 50 attorney chapters, 120 law school chapters, and 60 Christian legal aid clinics which are assigned to the organization. The Christian Legal Society is organized into three different branches: the network for attorneys and law students (Attorney Ministries and Law Student Ministries), the Center for Law & Religious Freedom, and the Christian Legal Aid.

The Christian Legal Society holds an annual convention in the United States as well as various regional conferences. It also publishes a bi-annual magazine called The Christian Lawyer, a scholarly journal called The Journal of Christian Legal Thought, CLS Bible Studies, and CLS E-Devotionals. Its former publications include the Quarterly, The Defender, and the Religious Freedom Reporter.

=== Finances ===
CLS is a tax-exempt, non-profit organization, supported by dues, donations and gifts. Its donors include Alliance Defending Freedom who gave CLS over $420,000 in 2008.

== Membership ==
The organization's members includes attorneys, judges, law students, and others who profess their commitment to the CLS Statement of Faith. These members, which are claimed to be found in 1100 cities, are organized into attorney chapters, law student chapters, and fellowships throughout the United States.

It is stated that to become a member of Christian Legal Society, one must "believe in and sign" CLS’ Statement of Faith.

=== Goals of the organization ===
Since its foundation in 1961, CLS has proclaimed nine organizational objectives, as set forth in its amended articles of incorporation:

- To proclaim Jesus as Lord through all that we do in the field of law and other disciplines;
- To provide a means of society, fellowship and nurture among Christian lawyers;
- To encourage Christian lawyers to view law as ministry;
- To clarify and promote the concept of the Christian lawyer and to help Christian lawyers integrate their faith with their professional lives;
- To mobilize, at the national and local levels, the resources needed to promote justice, religious liberty, the inalienable right to human life, and biblical conflict reconciliation
- To encourage, disciple and aid Christian students in preparing for the legal profession;
- To provide a forum for the discussion of problems and opportunities relating to Christianity and the law;
- To cooperate with bar associations and other organizations in asserting and maintaining high standards of legal ethics; and,
- To encourage lawyers to furnish legal services to the poor and needy, and grant special consideration to the legal needs of churches and other charitable organizations.

== Important legal cases ==
=== University of Florida (2007) ===
On March 16, 2007, the Upsilon chapter at the University of Florida was officially recognized by the Beta Upsilon Chi (BYX) national board. The University of Florida, however, refused to recognize BYX. The university had refused to recognize the chapter as a registered student organization because the fraternity accepts only men and would not recognize the chapter as a social fraternity because the fraternity accepts only Christians.

On July 10, 2007, the Alliance Defense Fund Center for Academic Freedom and the Christian Legal Society filed suit (Beta Upsilon Chi Upsilon Chapter v. Machen, 586 F.3d 908, 911-912 (11th Cir. 2009)) on behalf of BYX against various officials from the University of Florida for various constitutional violations including unlawful discrimination. During the course of the proceedings, the 11th Circuit Court (United States Court of Appeals for the Eleventh Circuit on appeal from the Northern District of Florida, Leon County) ordered that the chapter be recognized pending the disposition of the appeal. The case was ultimately dismissed as moot when the university amended its policies to permit the registration of the chapter.

=== University of California, Hastings College of the Law (2010) ===
Their case Christian Legal Society v. Martinez reached the Supreme Court of the United States in 2010. It was argued on April 19, 2010 and decided June 28, 2010 against the CLS by a vote of 5-4. The court upheld, against a First Amendment challenge, the policy of the University of California, Hastings College of the Law governing official recognition of student groups, which required the groups to accept all students regardless of their status or beliefs in order to obtain recognition.
