= Kappa Phi =

National Christian sisterhood

- ΚΦ
- Founded: 1916; 110 years ago University of Kansas
- Type: Service
- Affiliation: Independent
- Status: Active
- Emphasis: Christian
- Scope: National
- Motto: "Others"
- Pillars: Service, Worship, Fellowship, and Study
- Slogan: "I’d love to!"
- Member badge
- Colors: Sky blue, Pine green, and White
- Symbol: Lighted candle
- Flower: Pink rose
- Tree: Pine
- Mascot: Lamb
- Publication: Candle Beam
- Chapters: 50
- Logo
- Former name: Kappa Phi Club
- Headquarters: 2135 Snowbird Drive; Manhattan, Kansas 66502; United States
- Website: kappaphi.org

Kappa Phi (ΚΦ), also called the Kappa Phi Club, is an American national Christian student society that was established at the University of Kansas in 1916.

== History ==
Kappa Phi formed from a freshman women's Sunday school class taught by Harriet (née Sterling) Thompson that met at a Methodist church in Lawrence, Kansas in 1915. Thompson was the wife of Gordon B. Thompson, the Wesley Foundation pastor at the University of Kansas. In 1916, four members of Thompson's class formed Kappa Phi Club for Methodist women at the University of Kansas; the group was sponsored by the United Methodist Church and worked closely with the Wesley Foundation.

The founders of Kappa Phi Club were Francis Adams, Ruth Daniels, Marie Deible, and Sara Jacobs. The founders wanted to develop character and to provide fellowship and friendship. The group also wanted to provide religious training, take care of incoming freshmen, increase the effectiness of the work of Methodist female students, and to provide a "wholesome social life".

Pastor Thompson helped promote Kappa Phi Club to other Wesley Foundation ministers. Women from the University of Iowa formed the Beta chapter in 1917. This followed by Gamma chapter at Iowa State University. In 1918, the club held its first national meeting or Council of Chapters in Kansas City where they drafted a constitution and selected Grand Officers to oversee the organizational operations.

The new chapters were established at colleges with a Wesley Foundation and were also sponsored by the wife of the campus pastor, along with a board of three to five patronesses. By 1922, nearly 1,000 women had joined the club's ten chapters. Kappa Phi expanded to 25 schools by 1938. There were 25 chapters at Welsey Foundation-affiliated universities by 1938. In 1967, Kappa Phi had a chapter at 33 colleges and universities.

In 1965, Kappa Phi became an interdenominational Christian society, welcome to all women interested in a Christian group. Its national headquarters are in Manhattan, Kansas.

== Symbols and traditions ==
The Kappa Phi seal has a central lighted candle in a holder with the Greek letters ΚΦ at its base, encircled by the group's aim, a pine bough, and pine cone. The society's crest has a silver shield with two azure blue chevrons at its base, a pink rose in the upper right corner, and a green pine tree in the upper left corner. Above the shield is a lighted silver candle in a gold holder. Below the shield is a scroll with the society's name. To either side of the shield are wreathes of green and silver.

Kappa Phi's colors are sky blue to represent trust, pine green to represent truth, and pure white to represent purity. Its flower is the pink rose which expresses the love that unites the sisters. Its tree is the Pine tree which represents strength and leadership. Its symbol is the lighted candle which represents "the living light of God in our lives." Its emblem is the lamb.

The Kappa Phi badge is shaped like a shield; it is gold with a black background with a white diagonal band with the Greek letters ΚΦ. There is also a rose in its upper section and a lighted candle in the lower section. Its edge is plain, and engraved, or features close-set pearls with a sapphire in the lower point and emeralds in the upper points. The pledge badge is gold and round with Greek letters ΚΦ on a green background; it is surrounded by a band that is half blue with a pine tree and half white with a candle. There is also an alumnae badge, a gold oval with a pink rose above the Greek letters ΚΦ.

Meetings begin with lighting a candle and singing the Kappa Phi hymn; meeting close with extinguishing the candle and singing a benediction. Its motto is "others" and its slogan is "I'd love to!" Its original motto was "Every Methodist university woman of today, a leader in the church tomorrow." Kappa Phi has four focus areas or pillars: Service, Worship, Fellowship, and Study." Its publication is the Candle Beam.

== Activities ==
The Meal in the Upper Room is held at Easter to commemorate Christ’s Last Supper. It is eaten in silence and is based on a Jewish Passover Seder. The Yule Log celebration is held annually at the last meeting before Christmas break.

== Membership ==
Membership is open to Christian women. Kappa Phi members are grouped as the Degree of the Pine for pledges, the Degree of the Light for active members, and the Degree of the Rose for alumnae.

== Chapters ==
Kappa Phi Club has both collegiate and alumnae chapters.

== See also ==
- Campus Crusade for Christ
- Christian sorority (fraternities and sororities)
- International Association of Methodist-related Schools, Colleges, and Universities
