= Beta Upsilon Chi =

American Christian social fraternity

- ΒΥΧ
- Founded: April 27, 1985; 41 years ago University of Texas
- Type: Social
- Affiliation: NIC
- Status: Active
- Emphasis: Christian
- Scope: National
- Motto: "Behold, how good and how pleasant it is when brothers dwell together in unity!" - Psalm 133:1
- Colors: Purple and White
- Chapters: 37
- Members: 2,700+
- Lifetime: 10,000+
- Headquarters: 12650 N. Beach Street; Suite 114 #305; Fort Worth, Texas 76244; United States
- Website: www.betaupsilonchi.org

Beta Upsilon Chi (ΒΥΧ, pronounced "Bucs") is an American Christian social fraternity. It was founded at the University of Texas at Austin in 1985 and has 37 active chapters as of 2025.

== History ==
In the spring of 1985, Craig Albert, a student at the University of Texas at Austin, mentioned his idea of forming a Christian fraternity to his friends who were involved in the Campus Crusade for Christ. Albert held a meeting at Jester dormitory to present his plan. The interest group continued to meet in a church basement and became official on April 27, 1985, announcing the founding of the fraternity with a beach-themed "Island Party".

Presenting themselves as an alternative to the typical fraternity scene, the founding fathers adopted the Greek letters Beta, Upsilon, and Chi to identify the fraternity as "Brothers Under Christ." The stated purpose of the fraternity was to "equip and empower college Christian men to live faithfully and lead courageously". Albert served as the fraternity's first president which met in the basement of the University Christian Church.

The founding fathers of the Alpha chapter were:

- Craig Albert
- Jeff Miller
- Erik Bradford
- Tim Miller
- Michael Brown
- Stuart Nolley
- David Cortright
- Keith Onishi
- David Daniels
- Steve Patrick
- John Douglas
- Roger Poupart
- John Edson
- Don Reid
- Richard Foster
- Brian Rynne
- Jeff Garrett
- Kenneth Sapp
- David Givens
- Garland Spiller
- Steve Hoehner
- Clayton Walther
- Clayton Jewett
- Wendel Weaver
- Scott Love
- John Wilson
- Mark McGee
- Greg Young
- Tse-Horng Yu

The process of growing from one chapter to a national organization was slow. Initially, the Alpha chapter rejected requests from Christian men at other schools to be initiated into the fraternity or to start new chapters. Eventually, in 1989, the founding fathers of Beta chapter were initiated at Texas Christian University in Fort Worth, Texas. Beta Upsilon Chi then expanded with Gamma and Delta chapters at Texas A&M University and Stephen F. Austin State University, respectively.

In 1994, the fraternity held another Island Party to give back to the Texas A&M community. Now an annual philanthropy event, the Island Party is a free Christian music concert or event provided to the entire university. The largest Island Party was held at the Iota chapter at Baylor University on April 20, 2007; the band Switchfoot was the headliner and attendance was estimated between 15,000 and 20,000 people.

Beta Upsilon Chi changed its policy regarding the expansion of chapters in February 2009. The fraternity's board of directors, in consultation with its board of advisors, implemented a three-phased expansion process for prospective chapters to pursue active chapter status.

Beta Upsilon Chi became a member of the NIC on September 22, 2016. The national fraternity is headquartered in Fort Worth.

== Symbols ==
The fraternity's name, Beta Upsilon Chi, was selected from the Greek letters ΒΥΧ to stand for Brothers Under Christ. Its official Bible verse is Psalm 133:1, which reads: "Behold, how good and how pleasant it is for brothers to dwell together in unity." The fraternity's colors are purple and white.

== Activities ==
Since the beginning, the chapter officers gather annually for a National Leadership Conference, which consists of all the officers of the fraternity and the national staff. This meeting is in the fall, and shortly follows the election of the local chapter leaders.

In the early spring of even-numbered years, the entire fraternity is called together for the National Summit, typically held outside of Dallas, Texas. The event includes Bible studies, worship, fellowship, athletic competitions, and seminars on fraternity issues. It is also at Summit where the fraternity's annual Delegate Convention takes place.

== Governance ==
=== Board of directors ===
At the national level, Beta Upsilon Chi is headed by a board of directors. This board is the ultimate authority in the fraternity and is responsible for the guidance of the fraternity. The board also comprises the governing body of the Beta Upsilon Chi corporation, a 501(c)(3) organization, which controls the assets of the fraternity. The board appoints an executive director to run the fraternity's daily business. In conjunction with this executive director, the board approves any charter changes. All members of the board of directors must be alumni of the fraternity; new members are appointed from the board of advisors.

=== Board of advisors ===
The fraternity's board of advisors serves as a consultative partner of the board of directors, with a voice but no vote in the directors' decisions. Board of Advisors members are appointed by the board of directors, in consultation with the national executive director. All members of the board of advisors must be alumni of the fraternity, and only alumni of chartered chapters may be appointed to the board.

=== Executive director ===
The ΒΥΧ executive director is the fraternity's national administrator. Through his staff, he coordinates the activities of the fraternity from its headquarters in Fort Worth, Texas. The executive director's staff is equally responsible for the day-to-day operation of the national fraternity, and staff from the National Headquarters frequently visit the chapters. The national executive director is an ex officio member of the board of directors; he has a voice in decisions, but no vote. Brian Lee became the fraternity's executive director in 2018.

=== Chapter governance ===
Chapters are authorized by a charter from the National Board of Directors, allowing each chapter to work under a chapter constitution that provides for the election of chapter officers. Chapter officers typically include a president, vice president, secretary, treasurer, chaplain, and a pledge trainer, sometimes called a new member captain. These officers are responsible for the administration of the chapter for a calendar year, including conducting ritual, overseeing meetings, organizing trips, implementing the pledging program, and organizing parties. The officers serve one-year terms and may be re-elected only once to a different office.

=== Interfraternity Council ===
From its inception in 1985 through at least 2007, chapters of Beta Upsilon Chi have chose not to affiliate with the Interfraternity Council (IFC) at the school where they are established. This [rpvoded controversial on some campuses because it means that ΒΥΧ does not pay IFC dues. On the other hand, IFC membership sometimes involves sanctioning rules and regulations that would be contrary to the purpose of ΒΥΧ. Because of the potential for conflict inherent in such affiliations, the National Board of Directors continues to uphold a policy prohibiting local chapters from affiliating with host university IFCs. However, Beta Upsilon Chi joined the National Interfraternity Conference in 2017, which would indicate that chapters should join their local IFC.

== Membership ==
Founding fathers from the Omicron chapter at a ΒΥΧ tailgate

There are three kinds of members in the fraternity: pledges, active members, and alumni members. Local chapters are composed of active members and pledges. Active members have voting rights and participate in rituals, leading worship, Bible study, and other activities. Active members become alumni members after their graduation. Pledges become members by finishing a semester-long pledging process, a process that differs from chapter to chapter.

All ΒΥΧ members are a part of cell groups that consist of four to six brothers and pledges who meet weekly for social activities and Bible study.

== Chapters ==
The fraternity is currently composed of 37 active chapters. Chapters are denominated by a letter of the Greek alphabet that corresponds with their order of admission into the fraternity.

== Religious discrimination ==
The fraternity had been involved in several court cases seeking to assert local chapters' rights to organize with leaders or to include as members those who share the organization's Christian beliefs. Until these court cases, three universities held that student organizations may not discriminate based on religion, among other things, and had asserted this blanket prohibition applies to religious student organizations. In all cases, the universities changed their policies.

=== University of Georgia ===
In late 2006, the Pi chapter at the University of Georgia was prevented from registering as a student organization by university officials "because the group requires its members and officers to share the group's Christian beliefs". After months of negotiation between university officials, student officers of the local chapter, and officials at the fraternity's national headquarters, attorneys with the Christian Legal Society and Alliance Defense Fund filed a civil rights suit on December 5, 2006, in the United States District Court for the Middle District of Georgia against the university on behalf of the fraternity.

On December 10, 2006, the Associated Press reported that the university would "remove the religion clause from the [university's anti-discrimination] policy for the Christian fraternity to settle this particular situation and is discussing an exception to religious discrimination [that] could be put into place much like an exception to gender discrimination is in place for same-sex social fraternities and sororities."

=== University of Missouri ===
Ten students formed a chapter of Beta Upsilon Chi at the University of Missouri in April 2006. In December 2006, a university administrator notified the chapter that it would have to abide by campus prohibitions on discrimination based on "race, color, religion, national origin, ancestry, age, gender, sexual orientation, disability" or status as a Vietnam War veteran. The fraternity objected and, with assistance from the Christian Legal Society, which sent university officials a letter listing several legal precedents protecting religious student groups' First Amendment rights of free association. In response, the university reversed its directive.

=== University of Florida ===
On March 16, 2007, the Upsilon chapter at the University of Florida was officially recognized by the ΒΥΧ national board. The University of Florida refused to recognize the chapter as a registered student organization because the fraternity did not accept non-Christians and would not recognize the chapter as a social fraternity because it was too exclusive. On July 10, 2007, the Alliance Defense Fund Center for Academic Freedom and the Christian Legal Society filed a lawsuit on behalf of Beta Upsilon Chi against officials of the university for various constitutional violations. During the legal proceedings, the 11th U.S. Circuit Court ruled that the university must recognize the chapter pending appeal. Ultimately, the case was dismissed when the university amended its policies to accommodate the chapter.

=== Vanderbilt University ===
On November 4, 2010, the Hustler student newspaper at Vanderbilt University published a report alleging that an anonymous alumnus and a senior member of the Beta Upsilon Chi chapter at Vanderbilt were evicted from the fraternity for being gay. If true, ΒΥΧ would have violated Vanderbilt policies against discrimination on the basis of sexual orientation. According to the Hustler, the ΒΥΧ code of conduct prohibits homosexuality, fornication, or adultery, citing I Corinthians 6:15-20 and Hebrew 13:4.

== Local chapter and member misconduct ==
=== University of Tennessee ===
On March 18, 2026 a brother at the University of Tennessee was arrested at the chapter’s house for 4 counts of aggravated sexual exploitation of a minor. The national fraternity suspended him from housing and activities, pending adjudication.

=== University of Oklahoma ===
On November 12, 2026, the Kappa chapter was placed on disciplinary probation by the University of Oklahoma for hazing activities occurring between August and October 2026.

== Notable members ==
- Ben Rector, Arkansas, singer/songwriter
- Tyler Toney, Garrett Hilbert, and Coby and Cory Cotton, Texas A&M, 4 of the 5 members of the sports and comedy group Dude Perfect, Cody Jones being the exception.
- Zac Alley, Clemson, defensive coordinator for the West Virginia Mountaineers
- Tim Halperin, TCU, singer/songwriter and former American Idol contestant.
- Tanner Smith, Clemson, influencer who was featured on the Netflix tv show Love on the Spectrum. Smith was a part of ClemsonLIFE, a program at Clemson for students with intellectual disabilities, and BYX was one of two fraternities to welcome ClemsonLIFE members in 2021.
- Doug McNamee, Baylor, Director of Athletics at Baylor University, and former President of Magnolia and Field & Stream.

== Related organizations ==
In 1988, women from University of Texas established Sigma Phi Lambda or Sisters for the Lord as a "female version of ΒΥΧ." In addition to its name, the sorority's system of cable groups closely mirrors Beta Upsilon Chi.

At the University of Alabama, due to the lack of a Sigma Phi Lambda chapter, the Alpha Iota chapter of BYX (founded in 2013) has been associated with the Tau chapter of Alpha Delta Chi, a small christian sorority with chapters at the University of Alabama and the University of North Alabama.

== See also ==
- List of social fraternities
- Christian fraternities
