= Alpha Delta Chi =

American collegiate Christian sorority

- ΑΔΧ
- Coat of Arms of Alpha Delta Chi
- Founded: 1925; 101 years ago University of California, Los Angeles
- Type: Social
- Affiliation: Independent
- Status: Active
- Emphasis: Christian
- Scope: National
- Motto: "As in a Mirror"
- Colors: Flame Red and Blue
- Flower: Gladiolus, Delphinium
- Jewel: Pearl
- Mascot: Lamb
- Publication: The Arête
- Chapters: 2 active
- Nickname: A-D-Chi
- Headquarters: United States
- Website: www.alphadeltachi.org

Alpha Delta Chi (ΑΔΧ) is an American Christian sorority founded at the University of California, Los Angeles in 1925.

== History ==
Alpha Delta Chi started at the University of California, Los Angeles in 1925. Its ten founders wanted to create a way for women to participate in Greek life without compromising their Christian values. The sorority was originally named Areta, which is Greek for "virtue".

The ten Alpha Delta Chi founders were:

- Alma Becker
- Willard Crowder Clawson
- Amy Culp
- Theta Slingerland Dean
- Evelyn Kepple Kay
- Marion Wright Madden
- Alice Slingerland McEachern
- Ruth Umsted Ohly
- Dorothea Harvey Schultz
- Dora Marie Showalter-Goertz

The focus of Alpha Delta Chi was for its members to grow spiritually, reach their full potential scholastically, and develop socially by forming Christian friendships. The sorority is Christian, but nondenominational.

A second chapter, Beta, was established on February 4, 1929, by two members who were attending graduate school at the University of California, Berkeley. The sorority held its first annual convention in Berkeley, California, in April 1939. During the meeting, the sorority voted to become a national organization, forming The National Association of Areta and its National Executive and advisory board.

At the June 1943 annual meeting, the sorority's name was changed to Alpha Delta Chi. It was incorporated in the State of California in 1946. In 1992, its first chapter was chartered outside of California at Murray State University.

By 2019, Alpha Delta Chi has chartered 26 chapters. As of 2024, it has four active chapters, a National Alumnae Association (ADX NAA), and local alumnae chapters.

== Symbols ==
Alpha Delta Chi's colors are flame red and blue. Its flowers are the gladiolus and the delphinium. Its mascot is the lamb and its jewel is the pearl. Its motto is "As in a Mirror". Its Bible verse is 2 Corinthians 3:18. The sorority's online newsletter is The Arête. Its nickname is A-D-Chi.

== Activities ==
Sorority members participate in Bible study, hold retreats, and volunteer in the community.

== Membership ==
Potential members must be churchgoing Christians of any denomination. Members must agree to forgo smoking, illegal drugs, underage drinking, and premarital sex.

== Chapters ==
Following is a list of Alpha Delta Chi chapters, with active chapters noted in bold and inactive chapters in italics.

Name	Charter date and range	Institution	Location	Status	Ref.
Alpha	1925–19xx?, 2005–2023	University of California, Los Angeles	Los Angeles, California	Inactive	(Note: Was called Areta until June 1943.)
Beta	February 4, 1929 – 1964; 1987	University of California, Berkeley	Berkeley, California	Inactive	(Note: The university kicked the sorority off campus in 1964, indicating that its membership requirements were against the university's new anti-discrimination policy. The sorority was restored once the university reversed its decision.)
Gamma	19xx?–19xx?	California State University, Los Angeles	Los Angeles, California	Inactive	
Delta	1945–19xx?, 1974–19xx?, 1996–202x ?	San Diego State University	San Diego, California	Inactive	
Epsilon	1949–19xx?, 2005–2024 ?	University of Southern California	Los Angeles, California	Inactive	
Zeta	1963–1969, 1974–1995, 2010–202x ?	California State University, Long Beach	Long Beach, California	Inactive	
Eta	1976–201x?	California State University, Northridge	Northridge, Los Angeles, California	Inactive	
Theta	1989–202x ?	California State University, Fresno	Fresno, California	Inactive	
Iota	1991–199x?, 2005–201x?	University of California, Santa Barbara	Santa Barbara County, California	Inactive	
Kappa	1992–19xx?, 2008–201x?	Murray State University	Murray, Kentucky	Inactive	
Lambda				Unassigned	
Mu	1993–202x?	California Polytechnic State University, San Luis Obispo	San Luis Obispo, California	Inactive	
Nu	1993–20xx?	University of California, Davis	Davis, California	Inactive	
Xi	1994–200x?	Illinois State University	Normal, Illinois	Inactive	
Omicron	1994–199x?	University of California, Irvine	Irvine, California	Inactive	
Pi	1997–202x ?	University of Colorado Boulder	Boulder, Colorado	Inactive	
Rho	2000–200x?	University of Cincinnati	Cincinnati, Ohio	Inactive	
Sigma	2003–2024	Georgia Tech	Atlanta, Georgia	Inactive	(Note: Chapter formed from Lamba Nu (local), established in 2001.)
**Tau**	2004	University of Alabama	Tuscaloosa, Alabama	Active	
Upsilon	2004–20xx?	University of Arkansas	Fayetteville, Arkansas	Inactive	
Phi	2004–200x?	Azusa Pacific University	Azusa, California	Inactive	
Chi	2004–202x ?	Georgia Southern University	Statesboro, Georgia	Inactive	
**Psi**	December 2006	University of North Alabama	Florence, Alabama	Active	
Omega	2010–2021	Colorado State University	Fort Collins, Colorado	Inactive	
Alpha Alpha	2013–20xx?	Seton Hall University	South Orange, New Jersey	Inactive	
Alpha Beta	2015-202x ?	University of Denver	Denver, Colorado	Inactive	
Alpha Gamma	2019–202x ?	Kennesaw State University	Kennesaw, Georgia	Inactive	

== Controversies ==
In 1964, the University of California, Berkeley banned the sorority, saying that its requirement for members to be Christian was against the university's new anti-discrimination policy. On other campuses, the sorority was not allowed to be a member of the Panhellenic Council because its Christian requirement is considered to be discrimination. The UC Berkeley chapter was allowed to return and join the Panhellenic Council in 1987.

In 2012, the sorority was involved in Alpha Delta Chi v. Reed, a lawsuit against the University of California, San Diego which had determined that the Christian sorority would have to accept an atheist leader. The case was appealed to the Supreme Court of the United States who declined to review the case.

== See also ==
- List of social sororities and women's fraternities
