= List of Pi Lambda Phi chapters =

Pi Lambda Phi is international social fraternity. It was founded on March 21, 1895, at Yale University in New Haven, Connecticut. It merged with Phi Beta Delta on February 1, 1941. It merged with Beta Sigma Tau in 1960 and Beta Sigma Rho in 1972. In the following chapter list, active chapters are indicated in bold and inactive chapters and institutions are in italics.

Chapter	Former name	Charter date and range	Institution	Location	Status	Ref.
Connecticut Iota	Iota	March 21, 1895 – 1906; 1917–1932	Yale University	New Haven, Connecticut	Inactive	
New York Alpha	Alpha	1896–1901, 1908–1931, 195x ?–1964	Columbia University	New York City, New York	Inactive	
New York Beta	Beta	1896–1902, 1959–1973	City College of New York	New York City, New York	Inactive	(Note: Chapter absorbed the local chapter of Beta Sigma Rho in 1960.)
Pennsylvania Epsilon Zeta	Zeta	1896–1900, 1912–1914, 1917–2019	University of Pennsylvania	Philadelphia, Pennsylvania	Inactive	(Note: Chapter absorbed the local chapters of Phi Beta Delta in 1941 and Beta Sigma Rho in 1972.)
New York Gamma	Gamma	1896–1901, 1910–1973	New York University	New York City, New York	Inactive	(Note: After going dormant, the chapter was revived by absorbing Sigma Iota, established in 1909.)
New York Delta	Delta	1896–1901, 1911–1973	Cornell University	Ithaca, New York	Inactive	
Massachusetts Delta Epsilon	Nu	1896–1900	Harvard University	Cambridge, Massachusetts	Inactive	
**Massachusetts Theta**	Delta Nu	1897–1900, 1941	Massachusetts Institute of Technology	Cambridge, Massachusetts	Active	(Note: Chapter was revived in 1941 by absorbing the Theta chapter of Phi Beta Delta, established in 1920.)
Illinois Omicron	Omicron	1897–1898, 1919–11949	University of Chicago	Chicago, Illinois	Inactive	
New York Xi	Xi	1897–1900	Union College	Schenectady, New York	Inactive	
Michigan Epsilon	Epsilon	1913–1915, 1924–1979, 1978–1980, 1988–1993, 1997–2000, 2009–2013	University of Michigan	Ann Arbor, Michigan	Inactive	(Note: Chapter formed from the Brhatrika Club (local), established in 1913. After dormancy, it reformed in 1924 from the Brhatrika Club (local), established in 1923. It absorbed the local chapter of Phi Beta Delta in 1941.)
**Pennsylvania Gamma Sigma**	Gamma Sigma	1914–2014, 2017	University of Pittsburgh	Pittsburgh, Pennsylvania	Active	(Note: Chapter formed from Gamma Sigma (local), established in 1912.)
**Pennsylvania Lambda**	Lambda	1915–1995, 2024	Lehigh University	Bethlehem, Pennsylvania	Active	(Note: Chapter formed from the Pioneer Club (local), in 1913. It was re-established as a colony in 2024.)
New Jersey Theta	Theta	1916–1996	Stevens Institute of Technology	Hoboken, New Jersey	Inactive	
Canada Eta	Eta	1921–1942, 1988–2003	McGill University	Montreal, Quebec, Canada	Inactive	
Canada Kappa	Kappa	1922–1966, 1969–1989	University of Toronto	Toronto, Ontario, Canada	Inactive	
**West Virginia Mu**	Mu	1922–1959, 2021 -	West Virginia University	Morgantown, West Virginia	Active Colony	(Note: Chapter formed from Alpha Beta, established in 1919.) (Note: Chapter was reestablished as a colony in 2020.)
New Hampshire Pi	Pi	1924–1971	Dartmouth College	Hanover, New Hampshire	Inactive	(Note: Chapter formed from Cosmos (local), established in 1915.)
Maryland Rho	Rho	1925–1943, 1979–1991	Johns Hopkins University	Baltimore, Maryland	Inactive	(Note: Chapter formed from Sigma Tau Omega, established in 1915.)
**Wisconsin Omega**	Tau	1926–1968, 1984	University of Wisconsin–Madison	Madison, Wisconsin	Active	(Note: Chapter formed from Phi Theta Ch, established in 1925.)
Massachusetts Upsilon	Upsilon	1927–1931	Amherst College	Amherst, Massachusetts	Inactive	(Note: Chapter formed from Flambeau Club (local), established in 1926.)
Nebraska Chi		1929–1952	Creighton University	Omaha, Nebraska	Inactive	(Note: Chapter formed from Pi Delta Sigma, established in 1925.)
**Rhode Island Phi**		1929–1963	Brown University	Providence, Rhode Island	Inactive	
Virginia Psi		1929–2003	College of William & Mary	Williamsburg, Virginia	Inactive	(Note: Chapter formed from Zeta Epsilon, established in 1929.)
Virginia Omega Alpha		1932–1944, 1969–200x ?, 20xx ?–2025	University of Virginia	Charlottesville, Virginia	Inactive	(Note: Chapter formed from the Lawn Club (local), established in 1931.)
North Carolina Omega Beta		1940–1984, 1999–2022	University of North Carolina at Chapel Hill	Chapel Hill, North Carolina	Colony	(Note: Chapter formed from Omega Beta (local), established in 1939.)
Pennsylvania Sigma		1940–1983	Lafayette College	Easton, Pennsylvania	Inactive	(Note: Chapter formed from Towers Club, established in 1925.)
**Ohio Mu**		1941–1973, 1992–2003	University of Cincinnati	Cincinnati, Ohio	Colony	(Note: Chapter formed from the Mu chapter of Phi Beta Delta, established in 1920.)
California Kappa		1941–1952	University of Southern California	Los Angeles, California	Inactive	(Note: Chapter formed from the Kappa chapter of Phi Beta Delta, established in 1920.)
Missouri Pi		1941–1967	Washington University in St. Louis	St. Louis, Missouri	Inactive	(Note: Chapter formed from the Pi chapter of Phi Beta Delta, established in 1921.)
**California Tau**		1941	University of California, Berkeley	Berkeley, California	Active	(Note: Chapter formed from the Tau chapter of Phi Beta Delta, established in 1922)
California Upsilon		1941–1969	University of California, Los Angeles	Los Angeles, California	Inactive	(Note: Chapter formed from the Upsilon chapter of Phi Beta Delta, established in 1922.)
Oklahoma Iota		1941–1963	University of Oklahoma	Norman, Oklahoma	Inactive	(Note: Chapter formed from the Iota chapter of Phi Beta Delta, established in 1922.)
Florida Delta		1941–2023, 2025	University of Florida	Gainesville, Florida	Active Colony	(Note: Chapter formed from the Delta chapter of Phi Beta Delta, established in 1925. It absorbed Zeta Beta Tau in 2015.)
**Pennsylvania Alpha Delta**		1941–2008, 2012	Temple University	Philadelphia, Pennsylvania	Active	(Note: Chapter formed from the Alpha Delta chapter of Phi Beta Delta, established in 1927.)
**Ohio Alpha Epsilon**		1941–1943, 1960–1978, 2021	Ohio State University	Columbus, Ohio	Active	(Note: Chapter formed from the Alpha Epsilon chapter of Phi Beta Delta, established in 1928. After dormancy, it was reformed in 1960 by absorbing the Ohio State chapter of Beta Sigma Tau, established in 1948.)
South Carolina Alpha Zeta		1941–1950	University of South Carolina	Columbia, South Carolina	Inactive	(Note: Chapter formed from the Alpha Zeta chapter of Phi Beta Delta, established in 1928.)
**Indiana Alpha Theta**		1941–1959, 2016	Indiana University Bloomington	Bloomington, Indiana	Active	(Note: Chapter formed from the Alpha Theta chapter of Phi Beta Delta, established in 1928.)
Illinois Tau Delta		1941–2009, 2013–2016	University of Illinois Urbana-Champaign	Champaign, Illinois	Inactive	(Note: Chapter formed from the Alpha Kappa chapter of Phi Beta Delta, established in 1934.)
Pennsylvania Omega Gamma		1942–1984, 19xx ?–2017	Pennsylvania State University	State College, Pennsylvania	Inactive	(Note: Chapter formed from the local chapter Phi Alpha Mu, established in 1941.)
New York Omega Epsilon		1943–1947, 1988–1997, 2001–2025	University at Buffalo	Buffalo, New York	Inactive	
Florida Omega Eta		1946–1962	University of Miami	Coral Gables, Florida	Inactive	
Pennsylvania Tau Omega		1947–1999	Franklin & Marshall College	Lancaster, Pennsylvania	Inactive	(Note: Chapter formed from Tau Omega, established in 1945.)
Pennsylvania Omega Kappa		1948–1981	Washington & Jefferson College	Washington, Pennsylvania	Inactive	(Note: Chapter formed from Sigma Delta Sigma, established in 1946.)
Massachusetts Alpha Epsilon		1949–1986	University of Massachusetts Lowell	Lowell, Massachusetts	Inactive	(Note: Chapter formed from Sigma Omega Psi, established in 1919.)
New York Beta Lambda		1945–1953, 1972–1976, 19xx?–1993	Syracuse University	Syracuse, New York	Inactive	(Note: Chapter formed from Lambda Club (local), established in 1946. After dormancy, it was reformed in 1972 from the Lambda chapter of Beta Sigma Rho, established in 1950.)
New York Omega Mu		1951–1966	New York University Washington Square and University College	Manhattan, New York City, New York	Inactive	
**New York Kappa Tau**		1954	Rensselaer Polytechnic Institute	Troy, New York	Active	(Note: Chapter formed from Kappa Tau, established in 1949.)
New York Sigma Tau		1958–1973	Brooklyn College	New York City, New York	Inactive	
Indiana Alpha Delta		1958–1999	Indiana State University	Terre Haute, Indiana	Inactive	(Note: Chapter formed from Alpha Delta Epsilon, established in 1957.)
Maine Beta Chi		1959–1984	Colby College	Waterville, Maine	Inactive	(Note: Chapter formed from Beta Chi (local), established in 1957.)
**Virginia Lambda Kappa**		1959–1997, 2018	Roanoke College	Salem, Virginia	Active	(Note: Chapter formed from Lambda Kappa Ps, established in 1947.)
Colorado Alpha Beta		1960–1973	University of Denver	Denver, Colorado	Inactive	
Ohio Beta Sigma		1960–1968	Ohio Wesleyan University	Delaware, Ohio	Inactive	(Note: Chapter formed from Beta Sigma Tau, established in 1948.)
Ohio Beta Tau		1960–2025	Baldwin Wallace University	Berea, Ohio	Inactive	(Note: Chapter formed from Beta Sigma Tau, established in 1948.)
Colorado Alpha Iota		1960–1963	University of Colorado Boulder	Boulder, Colorado	Inactive	(Note: Chapter formed from Beta Sigma Tau, established in 1949.)
New Jersey Alpha Lambda		1961–1969, 2017–2020	Rutgers University–New Brunswick	New Brunswick, New Jersey	Inactive	(Note: Chapter formed from the Knights Club (local), established in 1959.)
**New York Phi Lambda**		1963–1994, 2013	Adelphi University	Garden City, New York	Active	(Note: Chapter formed from Phi Lambda Rho, established in 1947.)
**Pennsylvania Delta Iota**		1965–2000, 2018	Drexel University	Philadelphia, Pennsylvania	Active	(Note: Chapter formed from Delta Iota (local), established in 1962.)
Connecticut Alpha Chi		1966–1969	University of Hartford	West Hartford, Connecticut	Inactive	(Note: Chapter formed from Alpha Chi, established in 1964.)
New York Alpha Mu		1967–1970	Lehman College	Bronx, New York	Inactive	(Note: Chapter may have included CUNY Hunter College.)
Massachusetts Kappa Nu		1967–1981, 2000–2002	University of Massachusetts Amherst	Amherst, Massachusetts	Inactive	(Note: Chapter formed from Phi Kappa Nu, established in 1965.)
New York Delta Epsilon		1967–1999	LIU Post	Brookville, New York	Inactive	
New York Lambda Delta		1967–1971	Queens College, City University of New York	Flushing, Queens, New York City, New York	Inactive	
New York Eta Chi		1968–1975	Hobart College	Geneva, New York	Inactive	(Note: Chapter formed from Beta Sigma, established in 1961.)
Pennsylvania Phi Delta		1968–1988	Alliance College	Cambridge Springs, Pennsylvania	Inactive	(Note: Chapter formed from Phi Delta Rho.) (Note: The college closed in 1987.)
Connecticut Delta Kappa		1968–1971	University of Bridgeport	Bridgeport, Connecticut	Inactive	
Connecticut Tau Kappa		1968–1975	Quinnipiac University	Hamden, Connecticut	Inactive	(Note: Chapter formed from Tau Kappa Beta, established in 1958.)
New Mexico Sigma Chi		1968–1972	New Mexico Highlands University	Las Vegas, New Mexico	Inactive	
Pennsylvania Gamma Chi		1968–1977	West Chester University	West Chester, Pennsylvania	Inactive	
**Pennsylvania Phi Sigma**		1969	Saint Joseph's University	Philadelphia, Pennsylvania	Active	(Note: Chapter formed from Rho Pi Phi, established in 1934. It was originally located at the University of Sciences in Philadelphia.)
Texas Lambda		1969–1973, 1994–2003	University of Texas at Austin	Austin, Texas	Inactive	(Note: After going dormant, the chapter was reformed from Lambda Society (local), established in 1993.)
**Rhode Island Gamma Upsilon**		1970–1974	University of Rhode Island	Houlton, Maine	Inactive	
Maine Kappa Beta		1970–1976	Ricker College	Las Vegas, New Mexico	Inactive	(Note: The college closed in 1978.)
Florida Delta Tau		1971–1992	Jacksonville University	Jacksonville, Florida	Inactive	
**North Carolina Delta Zeta**		1971–1978, 1994–200x ?	East Carolina University	Greenville, North Carolina	Active	(Note: Chapter was reestablished as a colony in 2018.)
Pennsylvania Omega Delta		1971–2005	Penn State Altoona	Logan Township, Pennsylvania	Inactive	
Texas Alpha Omega		1972–1975	Texas Tech University	Lubbock, Texas	Inactive	
Pennsylvania Beta Zeta		1972–1996	Carnegie Mellon University	Pittsburgh, Pennsylvania	Inactive	(Note: Chapter formed from the Zeta chapter of Beta Sigma Rho, established in 1922.)
New Jersey Beta Theta		1972–1983	Rutgers University–Newark	Newark, New Jersey	Inactive	(Note: Chapter formed from the Theta chapter of Beta Sigma Rho, established in 1935.)
Canada Kappa Iota		1972–2003	University of Western Ontario	London, Ontario, Canada	Inactive	(Note: Chapter formed from the Iota chapter of Beta Sigma Rho, established in 1945.)
**New York Beta Omicron**		1972–2012, 2017	St. John's University	New York City, New York	Active	(Note: Chapter formed from the Omicron chapter of Beta Sigma Rho, established in 1968.)
**North Carolina Omega Zeta**		1978–1997, 2012	Western Carolina University	Cullowhee, North Carolina	Active	
**Pennsylvania Beta Upsilon**		1982–2005	East Stroudsburg University of Pennsylvania	East Stroudsburg, Pennsylvania	Colony	(Note: Chapter was reformed as a colony in 2025.)
North Carolina Zeta Alpha		1983–1992, 1997–2002	University of North Carolina at Asheville	Asheville, North Carolina	Inactive	
Michigan Mu Delta		1984–1994	Michigan State University	East Lansing, Michigan	Inactive	
Pennsylvania Alpha Xi		1984–1988	King's College	Wilkes-Barre, Pennsylvania	Inactive	
**Pennsylvania Sigma Upsilon**		1984	Shippensburg University of Pennsylvania	Shippensburg, Pennsylvania	Active	
**Virginia Omega Rho**		1984–2013	Virginia Commonwealth University	Richmond, Virginia	Colony	
Virginia Omicron Zeta		1984–xxxx?, 2010–2023	Virginia Tech	Blacksburg, Virginia	Inactive	
Maryland Pi Phi		1985–2012	Towson University	Towson, Maryland	Inactive	
New York Kappa Alpha		1985–2005	University at Albany, SUNY	Albany, New York	Inactive	
Alabama Alpha Zeta		1986–1990	Auburn University	Auburn, Alabama	Inactive	
Massachusetts Kappa Theta		1986–1996	Boston University	Boston, Massachusetts	Inactive	
**Maryland Kappa Delta**		1986–19xx ?, 2017	Salisbury University	Salisbury, Maryland	Active	(Note: After going dormant, the chapter reformed as a colony in 2010.)
Michigan Alpha Omega		1986–2016	Siena Heights University	Adrian, Michigan	Inactive	
New York Kappa Gamma		1986–2001	State University of New York at Cortland	Cortland, New York	Inactive	
Canada Kappa Kappa		1987–2016	University of Windsor	Windsor, Ontario, Canada	Inactive	
Pennsylvania Kappa Eta		1987–2016	Widener University	Chester, Pennsylvania	Inactive	
Florida Kappa Epsilon		1987–2002	Florida Atlantic University	Boca Raton, Florida	Inactive	
Pennsylvania Kappa Omega		1988–1994	Albright College	Reading, Pennsylvania	Inactive	(Note: Chapter started as a colony in 1985.)
California Tau Alpha		1988–1990; 2020–2023	San Francisco State University	San Francisco, California	Inactive	
Michigan Delta Beta		1989–2018	Ferris State University	Big Rapids, Michigan	Inactive	
Pennsylvania Delta Phi		1989–1998	Edinboro University of Pennsylvania	Edinboro, Pennsylvania	Inactive	
New York Omicron Rho		1990–2019	Binghamton University	Vestal, New York	Inactive	
New Jersey Omicron Kappa		1991–1993	Fairleigh Dickinson University	Madison, New Jersey	Inactive	
New York Iota Chi		1991–1993	Ithaca College	Ithaca, New York	Inactive	
Virginia Delta Chi		1991–2018	University of Virginia's College at Wise	Wise, Virginia	Inactive	
Minnesota Kappa Chi		1991–2017	Winona State University	Winona, Minnesota	Disaffiliated (KX)	
Pennsylvania Gamma Zeta		1991–1993	Robert Morris University	Moon Township, Pennsylvania	Inactive	
**Florida Delta Upsilon**		1992	Florida Institute of Technology	Melbourne, Florida	Active	
**Virginia Alpha Psi**		1992–2011, 2015	Christopher Newport University	Newport News, Virginia	Active	
Maryland Chi Mu		1992–1994	University of Maryland, College Park	College Park, Maryland	Inactive	
**Maryland Alpha Omicron**		1993–2011, 2014	Frostburg State University	Frostburg, Maryland	Active	(Note: Chapter formed from Kappa Chi Kappa, established in 1989.)
Delaware Delta Alpha		1993–1994	University of Delaware	Newark, Delaware	Inactive	
Texas Alpha Mu		1993–1994	Texas A&M University	College Station, Texas	Inactive	
**Washington Epsilon Alpha**		1995	Eastern Washington University	Cheney, Washington	Active	
North Carolina Omega Tau		1996–2003	Appalachian State University	Boone, North Carolina	Inactive	
**Florida Epsilon Lambda**		1996–2013, 2020	Florida State University	Tallahassee, Florida	Active	
Florida Epsilon Delta		1996–2002	Lynn University	Boca Raton, Florida	Inactive	
Florida Epsilon Eta		1996–2002	Saint Leo University	St. Leo, Florida	Inactive	
Indiana Epsilon Gamma		1993–2020	Vincennes University	Vincennes, Indiana	Inactive	
North Carolina Epsilon Kappa		1997–2016	North Carolina State University	Raleigh, North Carolina	Inactive	
Michigan Alpha Chi		1997–2000	Central Michigan University	Mount Pleasant, Michigan	Inactive	
Indiana Epsilon Iota		2002–2003	Purdue University	West Lafayette, Indiana	Inactive	
Pennsylvania Beta Gamma		2007–2019	Indiana University of Pennsylvania	Indiana, Pennsylvania	Inactive	(Note: Chapter formed from Beta Gamma Alpha, established in 1988.)
Pennsylvania Gamma Psi		2010–2013	Lock Haven University of Pennsylvania	Lock Haven, Pennsylvania	Inactive	
Wisconsin Chi Upsilon		2011–2019	Carroll University	Waukesha, Wisconsin	Inactive	
Wisconsin Alpha Nu		2012–2016	University of Wisconsin–Stout	Menomonie, Wisconsin	Inactive	
Virginia Theta Xi		2016–2019	Radford University	Radford, Virginia	Inactive	(Note: Chapter was formed as a colony in 2009.)
**Pennsylvania Alpha Gamma**		2016	Bloomsburg University of Pennsylvania	Bloomsburg, Pennsylvania	Active	
Iowa Alpha Phi		2016–2017	University of Northern Iowa	Cedar Falls, Iowa	Inactive	
California Alpha Upsilon		2018–2023	University of California, Merced	Merced, California	Inactive	(Note: Chapter was formed as a colony in 2016.)
New York Alpha Pi		2018–2023	Stony Brook University	Stony Brook, New York	Inactive	
Michigan Beta Alpha		2020–2022	Grand Valley State University	Allendale, Michigan	Inactive	
**New York Alpha Rho**		2022	Pace University, Pleasantville Campus	Pleasantville, New York	Active	(Note: Chapter was formed as a colony in 2015.)
**New York Alpha Tau**		2023	Hofstra University	Hempstead, New York	Active	(Note: Chapter was formed as a colony in 2016.)
**Florida Beta Delta**			Florida International University	University Park, Florida	Colony	(Note: Colony established in 2024.)

Pi Lambda Phi assigned names to chapters that were defunct at the time of its mergers with Beta Sigma Rho, Beta Sigma Tau, and Phi Beta Delta. Unless these chapters were reactivated as Pi Lambda Phi chapters, they were excluded from this list. However, they can be found in the articles of the absorbed fraternities.
