= University of Kentucky student life =

The University of Kentucky in Lexington, Kentucky offers a variety of campus living and recreational options for students.

== Greek-letter organizations ==
There are more than fifty active fraternities and sororities at the University of Kentucky. The social fraternities and sororities have chapter houses.

=== Sororities ===
In the fall of 2023, 27 percent of the University of Kentucky's undergraduate women belong to a social sorority. Following are the social sororities at the University of Kentucky.

Name	Chapter name	Chapter charter date and range	Status	Ref.
Alpha Chi Omega	Delta Omega	1966–1976, 2015	Active	
Alpha Delta Pi	Beta Psi	1941	Active	
Alpha Delta Theta	Beta	1922–1937	Inactive	
Alpha Gamma Delta	Epsilon	1908	Active	
Alpha Kappa Alpha	Iota Sigma	1975	Active	
Alpha Omicron Pi	Kappa Omega	1982–2019	Inactive	
Alpha Phi	Iota Nu	2009	Active	
Alpha Xi Delta	Xi	1908–2004	Inactive	
Beta Sigma Omicron	Alpha Gamma	1926–1932	Inactive	
Ceres	Nu	1997–20xx ?	Inactive	
Chi Omega	Lambda Alpha	1914	Active	
Delta Delta Delta	Delta Rho	1923	Active	
Delta Gamma	Delta Beta	1962	Active	
Delta Phi Lamba			Active	
Delta Phi Mu (local)		2008–201x ?	Inactive	
Delta Sigma Theta	Mu Epsilon	1975	Active	
Delta Zeta	Alpha Zeta	1923–1942, 1945	Active	
Gamma Phi Beta	Gamma Omicron	1966–1982, 2019	Active	
Kappa Alpha Theta	Gamma Iota	1945	Active	
Kappa Beta Gamma	Alpha Nu	2017	Active	
Kappa Delta	Epsilon Omega	1910	Active	
Kappa Kappa Gamma	Beta Chi	1910	Active	
Phi Sigma Rho	Epsilon	1999	Active	
Phi Sigma Sigma	Beta Mu	1952–1957	Inactive	
Pi Beta Phi	Kentucky Beta	1962	Active	
Phi Mu	Rho Iota	2011	Active	
Sigma Gamma Rho	Mu Omicron	1992	Active	
Sigma Kappa	Theta Rho	1989–2010	Inactive	
Sigma Lambda Gamma	Omicron Zeta	2018	Active	
Sigma Phi Lambda	Alpha Tau	2018–2022	Inactive	
Tau Beta Sigma	Eta Zeta	1984	Active	
Theta Nu Xi	Alpha Omicron	2016	Active	
Zeta Phi Beta	Iota Mu	1983	Active	
Zeta Tau Alpha	Alpha Chi	1924–1992	Inactive	

=== Fraternities ===
In the fall of 2023, eighteen percent of the University of Kentucky's undergraduate male students belong to a social fraternity. Following are the social fraternities at the University of Kentucky.

Name	Chapter name	Chapter charter date and range	Status	Ref.
Alpha Epsilon Pi	Lambda Kappa	1972–1978	Inactive	
Alpha Gamma Rho	Omicron	1920	Active	
Alpha Lambda Tau	Sigma	1932–1935	Inactive	
Alpha Phi Alpha		1965	Active	
Alpha Phi Omega	Alpha Zeta	1933	Active	
Alpha Sigma Phi		1917–1960, 2017	Active	
Alpha Tau Omega		1909–2018	Inactive	
Beta Sigma Rho		1949–1952	Inactive	
Beta Theta Pi		1990–199x ?, 2013	Active	
Beta Upsilon Chi		2014	Active	
Chi Psi		2016	Active	
Delta Chi		1914–1954, 1978–1981	Inactive	
Delta Sigma Phi		1994	Active	
Delta Tau Delta		1924	Active	
FarmHouse		1951–2021	Inactive	
Iota Phi Theta		2007	Active	
Kappa Alpha Order		1893	Active	
Kappa Alpha Psi		1981	Active	
Kappa Sigma		1901	Active	
Lambda Chi Alpha		1930–2010	Inactive	
Omega Psi Phi		1980	Active	
Omicron Alpha Tau		1916–1918	Inactive	
Phi Beta Sigma		1990	Active	
Phi Delta Theta		1901–1972, 1979–1994, 2004–2011, 2018	Active	
Phi Gamma Delta		1958–1983, 1994	Active	
Phi Kappa Psi		1988–2016, 2025	Active	
Phi Kappa Tau		1920–1990, 1996	Active	
Phi Mu Alpha Sinfonia		1922	Active	
Phi Sigma Kappa		1926	Active	
Pi Kappa Alpha		1901–2014, 2018	Active	
Pi Kappa Phi		1996–200x ?; 2010–2014, 2024	Active	
Pi Lambda Phi		1949	Inactive	
Sigma Alpha Epsilon		1900–2020, 202x ?	Active	
Sigma Alpha Mu		1915–1924	Inactive	
Sigma Chi		1893	Active	
Sigma Lambda Beta	Chi Epsilon	2016	Active	
Sigma Nu		1902–1965, 1967–2012, 2016	Active	
Sigma Phi Epsilon		1933–1989, 1994–2009, 2015	Active	
Sigma Pi		1973–2011, 2917	Active	
Tau Kappa Epsilon		1951–199x ?	Inactive	
Theta Chi		1968–1990, 2011	Active	
Triangle		1920–1983, 2005	Active	
Zeta Beta Tau		1942–1973	Inactive	

=== Honor and recognition societies ===
Name	Chapter name	Chapter charter date and range	Status	Ref.
Alpha Alpha Alpha			Active	
Alpha Psi Omega	Alpha Zeta Epsilon		Inactive	
Kappa Kappa Psi	Eta Zeta	April 16, 1977	Active	
Omicron Delta Kappa	University of Kentucky	1925	Active	

=== Professional fraternities and sororities ===
Name	Chapter name	Chapter charter date and range	Status	Ref.
Block and Bridle		1923	Active	
Delta Sigma Delta	Alpha Xi	2008	Active	
Kappa Psi	Upsilon	1909	Active	
Lambda Kappa Sigma	Alpha Nu	1958	Active	
Phi Alpha Delta			Active	
Phi Delta Epsilon	Kappa Psi	1978	Active	
Sigma Alpha	Beta Omicron	2013	Active	
Sigma Alpha Iota	Delta Omega	1967	Active	

=== Hazing incidents ===
After Thomas “Lofton” Hazelwood, an 18-year-old freshman at UK was killed in a hazing incident in October 2021, a report commissioned by the university pointed to an active tradition of hazing at the school, and a “deeply ingrained culture of alcohol” in Hazelwood's fraternity. Some fraternities forced members to eat and drink, others instituted personal servitude. Lofton's Law, making hazing a felony/misdemeanor in Kentucky, was passed in 2023.

== Religion and life-philosophy ==
Following are some of the religious organizations at the University of Kentucky.

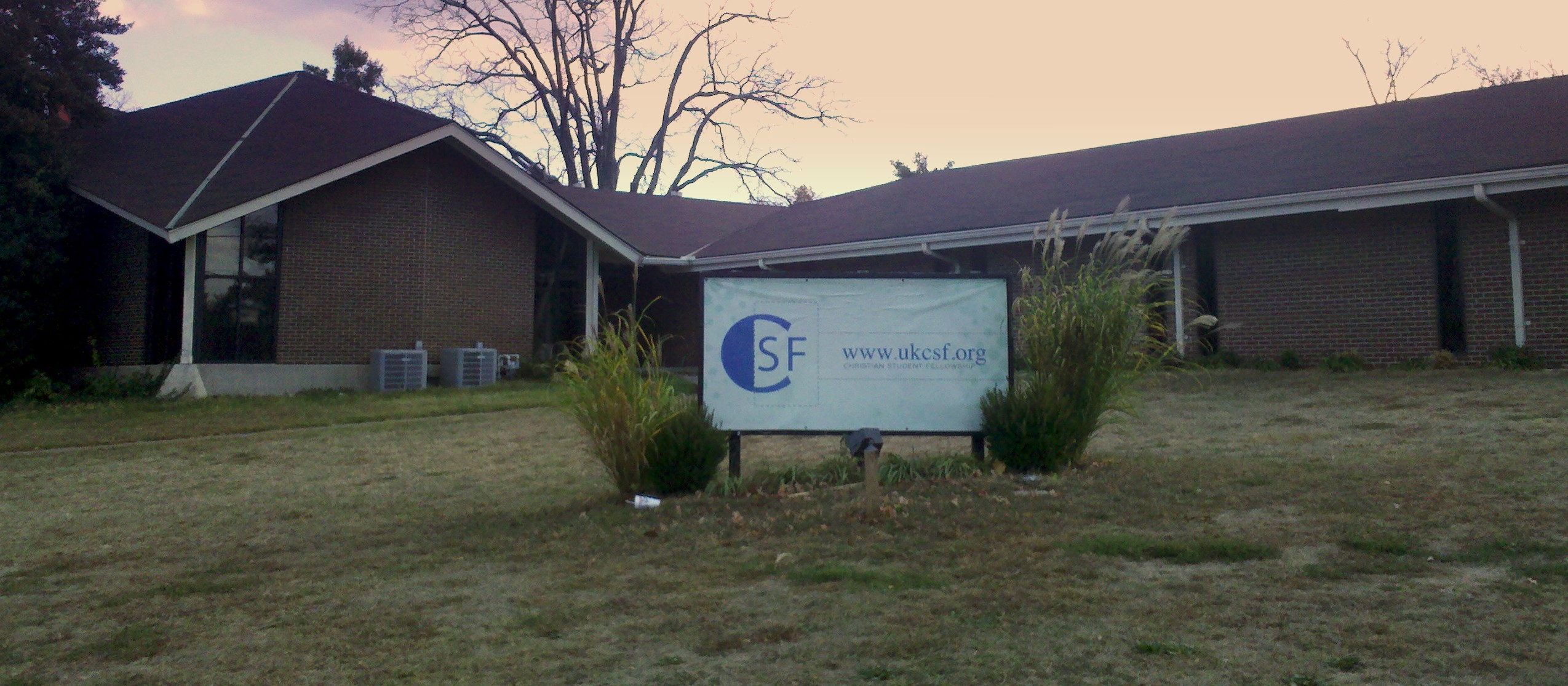
Christian Student Fellowship building

=== Christianity ===
- Baptist Campus Ministries
- Catholic Newman Center
- Christian Student Fellowship
- Cru
- Fellowship of Catholic University Students (FOCUS)
- Orthodox Christian Fellowship
- Reformed University Fellowship
- Wesley Foundation
- Young Life

=== Islam ===
- Muslim Student Association

=== Judaism ===
- Chabad on Campus
- Hillel Foundation

=== Secular humanism and nontheism ===
- Secular Student Alliance

== Campus recreation ==
The university has several campus recreational facilities. The Johnson Center features basketball courts, group fitness studios, racquetball courts, rock climbing walls, a running track, and weight lifting facilities. The Lancaster Aquatic Center, located next to the Johnson Center, opened in 1989. The Alumni Gym Fitness Center opened in 2018 and is a renovation of the historic Alumni Gymnasium, which was home to UK men's basketball from 1924 to 1950.

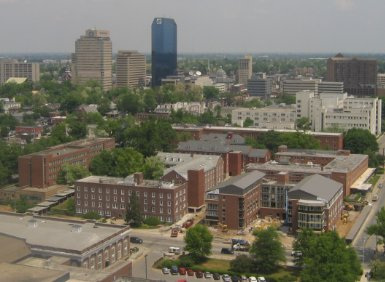
North Campus residence halls, with downtown Lexington in the background.

== Residence halls ==
In the fall of 2023, 34 percent of the students at the University of Kentucky lived in college-owned or affiliated housing, while 66 percent of student lived off campus. Following are residence halls at the University of Kentucky.

Name	Location	Opened date	Notes	Ref.
Baldwin Hall	Central Campus	2005		
Ball Hall	Central Campus	2014	Known as Woodland Glen II before 2020–21	
Blazer Hall	North Campus	2014		
Boyd Hall	North Campus	2016		
Chellgren Hall	Central Campus	2015		
Donovan Hall	Central Campus	2013		
Haggin Hall	Central Campus	2014		
Holmes Hall	North Campus	2016		
Ingels Hall	Central Campus	2005		
Jewell Hall	North Campus	2014		
Lyman T. Johnson Hall	Central Campus	2013		
Lewis Hall	Central Campus	2017		
Pigman Hall	Central Campus	2015		
Roselle Hall	North Campus	2005		
Smith Hall	Central Campus	2005		
University Flats	Central Campus	2017		
Wildcat Coal Lodge	North Campus	2012	Houses the men's basketball team	
Woodland Glen IV	Central Campus	2015		
Woodland Glen V	Central Campus	2015	Interprofessional Healthcare Residential College Community	

== Campus safety ==
The university has had issues with safety on campus. In a survey of 1,000 female university students, conducted in the spring of 2004, 36.5% reported having been victims of rape, stalking, or physical assault while on campus. While campus law enforcement statistics do not match the survey results, campus officials have taken steps to increase safety.

In response to the survey, university president Lee T. Todd, Jr. launched an initiative in September 2005 titled the Campus Safety Imperative, which included a quadrupling of annual expenditures on safety. Todd specifically linked campus safety to the goal of becoming a top-20 public research institution, stating that "We will never make gains toward becoming a top-twenty public research institution if our students are unsafe or if they lack a sense of physical security. It is part of our fundamental mission, then, to create a campus that provides a safe place to live, to work, and to learn."
