= Nelson L. Goldberg =

Nelson L. Goldberg (March 8, 1930 – September 25, 2005) was an innovator, pioneer and visionary in telecommunications and developed the first cable system to be acquired by Comcast. He was the son of the late Edward and Fannie Menzer Goldberg, was a native of New Kensington, Pennsylvania. He graduated from Arnold High and then Pennsylvania State University in 1956 where he was a member of the Pi Lambda Phi fraternity. He served in the United States Army during the Korean War.

Born of humble beginnings in 1930, he led an extraordinary life that touched countless people. Goldberg’s career began in radio sales at WKPA AM in New Kensington. In 1958, he became General Manager of [WKPA] and then purchased the station in 1961. Goldberg acquired WYDD-FM in 1963 and operated the radio stations for more than 25 years. WYDD was the first radio station to offer an all jazz format and Goldberg developed and promoted Jazz Horizons, Pittsburgh’s first jazz concert series that featured jazz legends such as Dizzy Gillespie, Dave Brubeck and Nina Simone. Goldberg developed WEFB-TV (TV3) and Westmoreland Cable in 1968, one of the first cable franchises in western Pennsylvania. The cable system was later sold to Comcast Corporation.

Further establishing himself at the forefront of telecommunications and technology, Goldberg founded Mass Communications and Management and Total Communications Systems (TCS). TCS was at one point heralded as the largest independently owned television production company in the country. Among the company’s achievements were the first pay-per-view broadcast of a sporting event (a Penn State vs. Cincinnati football game); syndicated broadcasts of Penn State, Notre Dame and Big Ten football; the first nationally syndicated college football highlight show (The Penn State Story); in 1981, the introduction of the largest and most sophisticated mobile television facility in the industry that was used to televise hundreds of events, including Super Bowls and Olympic broadcasts. He also developed the Meadows Racing Network (now Ladbroke Racing Network). Goldberg’s experience in sports broadcasting also led to a secondary career in sports marketing and representation, working with former NFL players such as Tony Dorsett, Jimmy Cefalo, Terry Bradshaw, and Matt Bahr.

In the 1980s, Goldberg was the first to privately own satellite transponders and perceptively anticipated the advent of commercial television satellite broadcasting. Throughout his career, he continuously broke ground in developing new kinds of broadcast programming and the manner in which they were transmitted.The 12-Year War: When Penn State vs. Notre Dame Was the World

In 1988, Nelson Goldberg was inducted into the Pi Lambda Phi PA Omega Gamma chapter Hall of Fame. This induction ceremony included a visit and introduction by Penn State head football coach Joe Paterno. In May 2011, Nelson L. Goldberg was inducted into the Western Pennsylvania Jewish Sports Hall of Fame.
