= List of Tau Delta Phi chapters =

Tau Delta Phi is a national collegiate fraternity founded in New York City in 1910.

== Chapters ==
In the following list, active chapters are in bold and inactive chapters are in italics.

Chapter	Charter date and range	Institution	Location	Status	Ref.
Alpha	June 22, 1910 – 19xx ?	City University of New York	New York, New York	Inactive	(Note: This chapter began at DeWitt Clinton High School as Phi Sigma Beta (local). The founders entered college between 1910 and 1912, taking the fraternity with them and forming its first three collegiate chapters. Later, Phi Sigma Beta changed its name to Tau Delta Phi.)
Beta	June 22, 1910 – 1927	New York College of Dentistry	New York City, New York	Consolidated	(Note: Beta chapter consolidated into Gamma chapter.)
Gamma	June 22, 1910 – 1970; 1983–1988; 1992–200x ?; 2012–202x ?	New York University	New York City, New York	Inactive	(Note: Gamma chapter absorbed NYU's Epsilon chapter' of Omicron Alpha Tau at that organization's national demise.)
Delta	1916–1931, 1942–1949, 1983–1985	Columbia University	New York City, New York	Inactive	
Epsilon	1917–1951	Boston University	Boston, Massachusetts	Inactive	
Zeta	1918–1929	Harvard University	Cambridge, Massachusetts	Inactive	
Eta	1919–1932	Massachusetts Institute of Technology	Cambridge, Massachusetts	Inactive	
Theta	1920–1933	Illinois Institute of Technology	Chicago, Illinois	Inactive	
Iota	1920–1970	University of Pennsylvania	Philadelphia, Pennsylvania	Inactive	
Kappa	1920–1928	University of Cincinnati	Cincinnati Ohio	Inactive	
Lambda	1921–1935	University of Chicago	Chicago, Illinois	Inactive	
Mu	1921–1923	Vanderbilt University	Nashville, Tennessee	Inactive	
Nu	1922–1935, 1947–1968	University of Michigan	Ann Arbor, Michigan	Inactive	
Xi	1923–1968	Northwestern University	Evanston, Illinois	Inactive	
Omicron	1924–1931	Ohio State University	Columbus, Ohio	Inactive	(Note: Chapter formed from Alpha Theta Omega (local), established in 1923.)
Pi	1924–1975	University of Illinois Urbana-Champaign	Champaign, Illinois	Inactive	
Rho	1926–1975	University of Texas at Austin	Austin, Texas	Inactive	
Sigma	1927–1933, 1948–1967	University of Southern California	Los Angeles, California	Inactive	
Tau	1927–1973	Lehigh University	Bethlehem, Pennsylvania	Inactive	(Note: Chapter formed from Upsilon Kappa (local), established in 1926.)
Chi	1928–1969	University of California, Los Angeles	Los Angeles, California	Inactive	
Phi	1928–1952	University of Minnesota	Minneapolis, Minnesota	Inactive	(Note: Chapter formed from Beta Sigma Epsilon (local), established in 1924.)
Upsilon	1929–1942	University of North Dakota	Grand Forks, North Dakota	Inactive	
Psi	1929–1974	Carnegie Mellon University	Pittsburgh, Pennsylvania	Inactive	(Note: Chapter formed from Gamma Nu (local), established in 1921.)
Omega	1928–1952	University of Manitoba	Winnipeg, Manitoba, Canada	Inactive	
Tau Alpha	1933–1972	Colby College	Waterville, Maine	Inactive	(Note: Chapters formed from Gamma Phi Epsilon (local), established in 1919. Colby College stopped allowing social fraternities and sororities in 1984.)
Tau Beta	1934–1971	Cornell University	Ithaca, New York	Inactive	(Note: Chapter formed from the Alpha chapter of Omicron Alpha Tau, originally chartered in 1912.)
Tau Gamma	1934–1976, 1993–199x ?	Rutgers University	New Brunswick, New Jersey	Inactive	(Note: Chapter formed from the Eta chapter of Omicron Alpha Tau, originally chartered in 1928.)
Gamma Upsilon	1938–1958, 1962–1969	New York University (Heights)	West Bronx, New York	Inactive	(Note: NYU's University Heights, Bronx campus was sold in 1973, with students consolidating to the main campus.)
Tau Delta	1947–1968	University of Arizona	Tucson, Arizona	Inactive	(Note: Chapter formed from the Pyramid Club, established in 1947.)
**Tau Epsilon**	1947	New Jersey Institute of Technology	Newark, New Jersey	Active	
Tau Zeta	1949–1978	Syracuse University	Syracuse, New York	Inactive	
Tau Eta	1950–1968	Loyola University Chicago	Chicago, Illinois	Inactive	
Tau Theta	1950–1959	Norwich University	Northfield, Vermont	Inactive	(Note: Chapter formed from Omega Iota (local), established in 1947.)
Tau Iota	1951–1976, 2008–201x ?	Rutgers University–Newark	Newark, New Jersey	Inactive	
Tau Kappa	1952–1973	Queens College, City University of New York	Queens, New York	Inactive	(Note: Chapter formed from Sigma Chi Beta (local), established in 1949.)
Tau Lambda	1952–1970	Alfred University	Alfred, New York	Inactive	(Note: Chapter formed from Beta Sigma Psi (local), established in 1947.)
Tau Mu	1953–1971	University of Miami	Coral Gables, Florida	Inactive	
Tau Nu	1952–1968	Hunter College, CUNY	New York City, New York	Inactive	
Tau Xi	1956–1971	LIU Brooklyn	Brooklyn, New York	Inactive	
Tau Omicron	1956–1972	Temple University	Philadelphia, Pennsylvania	Inactive	(Note: Chapter formed from Sigma Beta (local), established in 1954.)
Tau Pi	1957–1968	Roosevelt University	Chicago, Illinois	Inactive	(Note: Chapter formed from Alpha Mu Sigma (local), established in 1928.)
Tau Rho	1957–1968	Brooklyn College, CUNY	Brooklyn, New York	Inactive	(Note: Chapter formed from Phi Beta Upsilon (local), established in 1932.)
Tau Sigma	1962–1976	Pratt Institute	Brooklyn, New York	Inactive	(Note: Chapter formed from Delta Gamma Theta (local), established in 1898.)
Tau Tau	1965–1973, 2009–2011	Pennsylvania State University	University Park, Pennsylvania	Inactive	(Note: Chapter formed from the Pyramid Club (local), established in 1964. In 1973, the chapter withdrew and joined Tau Epsilon Phi's Epsilon Phi chapter. In 2007, the chapter was re-established from the Phi Society (local), a group that had broken away from Phi Delta Theta.)
Tau Upsilon	1966–1971	Michigan State University	East Lansing, Michigan	Inactive	
Tau Phi	May 27, 1967 – 1975	Seton Hall University	South Orange, New Jersey	Inactive	
Alpha Delta	1967–19xx ?	Baruch College, CUNY	New York City, New York	Inactive	
Tau Chi	1968–1970	University of Illinois Chicago	Chicago, Illinois	Inactive	
Tau Psi	1970–1971	LIU Post	Brookville, New York	Inactive	
Tau Omega	1969–1972	Texas A&M University–Corpus Christi	Corpus Christi, Texas	Inactive	(Note: Chapter formed from Alpha Beta Tau (local), established in 1968.)
Delta Beta	1969–1973	University of Maryland, College Park	College Park, Maryland	Inactive	(Note: Chapter formed from Tau Kappa Gamma (local), established in 1969.)
Delta Gamma	1969–19xx ?	Widener University	Chester, Pennsylvania	Inactive	(Note: Chapter formed from Gamma Phi Omega (local), established before 1969.)
Delta Delta	1969–200x ?	Polytechnic Institute of New York	New York City, New York	Inactive	(Note: Polytechnic Institute (then called Polytechnic University) affiliated with New York University.)
Delta Epsilon	1969–19xx ?	William Paterson University	Wayne, New Jersey	Inactive	(Note: Chapter formed from Tau Omega (local), established before 1969.)
Delta Zeta	1976–200x ?	Farmingdale State College	East Farmingdale, New York	Inactive	
Delta Eta	1975–200x ?	Cooper Union	New York City, New York	Inactive	
Delta Theta	1992–200x ?	SUNY, Stony Brook	Stony Brook, New York	Inactive	
Delta Iota	1994–2022	Ramapo College	Mahwah, New Jersey	Inactive	(Note: Chapter formed from Sigma Beta Tau (local), established before 1994.)
Delta Kappa	1995–2018	Stockton University	Galloway Township, New Jersey	Inactive	
Delta Lambda	1998–200x ?	Virginia Tech	Blacksburg, Virginia	Inactive	
Delta Mu	2002–200x ?	Polytechnic University	Brooklyn, New York	Inactive	(Note: Polytechnic University merged with New York University in 2014, becoming part of what is now New York University Tandon School of Engineering.)
Delta Nu	2004–2015	Christopher Newport University	Newport News, Virginia	Inactive	
**Delta Xi**	2008–2012, 2022	Caldwell University	Caldwell, New Jersey	Active	
Delta Omicron	2010–2012	George Mason University	Fairfax County, Virginia	Inactive	
**Delta Pi**	2012	Montclair State University	Montclair, New Jersey	Active	
**Delta Rho**	2013	Kutztown University of Pennsylvania	Kutztown, Pennsylvania	Active	
Delta Sigma	2014–2021	Rowan University	Glassboro, New Jersey	Inactive	
**Delta Tau**	2014	Monmouth University	West Long Branch, New Jersey	Active	
Delta Upsilon	2015–201x ?	Jacksonville State University	Jacksonville, Alabama	Inactive	

== See also ==
- List of social fraternities and sororities
- List of Jewish fraternities and sororities
