= Green Dot =

Green Dot may refer to:

- Green Dot Bystander Intervention, a bystander education approach
- Green Dot Corporation, a cash deposit and payment card network issuing Discover, MasterCard, and Visa cards
- Green Dot (India), a label in India for vegetarian food.
- Green Dot Public Schools, a not-for-profit organization which operates ten public schools in Los Angeles
- Green Dot (symbol), the license logo of Duales System Deutschland, an industry-funded packaging recycling system deployed first in Germany and later also some other European countries
- A name for 154.6 MHz in the business band service
