= The Center for Respect =

- Founded: 2003
- Founder: Mike Domitrz
- Area served: United States and Global
- Products: Voices of Courage, May I Kiss You?
- Website: www.centerforrespect.com

The Center for Respect (formerly Date Safe Project) is an anti-sexual assault organization in the United States which provides prevention materials and advocacy programs for middle schools, high schools, universities, community organizations, and the United States Military. Headquartered in Milwaukee, Wisconsin, The Center for Respect addresses consent, sexual assault awareness, bystander intervention, and support for survivors of rape.

The organization was formed by the American educator, activist, author and publisher, Mike Domitrz, in 2003 after his sister was sexually assaulted.

== Focus ==
The Center for Respect provides programs, trainings, and keynotes for helping communities and organization create a Culture of Respect. In schools and for the US military, they teach youth and adults that “asking first” makes a difference in creating safer intimacy and decreasing occurrences of sexual assault. They teach how a better understanding of consent leads to healthier dating and to a greater awareness of the issues surrounding human sexuality and sexual assault. The program focuses on a consent through asking first, bystander intervention, and supports survivors.

For businesses and associations, The Center for Respect provides keynotes and consulting for creating a culture of respect where every employee is equally valued. The Center for Respect also publishes educational materials for raising sexual assault awareness and reducing domestic violence and the Center for Respect itself has helped deliver the Domitrz's message worldwide.

== History ==
Mike Domitrz became an educator in the field of sexual assault awareness in 1991 after his older sister became a victim of a sexual assault in 1989. In 2003, he founded the organization, The Center for Respect, to help prevent such crimes. The organization helps sexual assault survivors cope with their trauma as well as arranges and gives presentations at schools and military institutions to prevent the issue all together from occurring in the society.

The Center for Respect, has been actively interacting with teenagers, school students, college & university students, Army, Air Force and Navy personnel to in its campaign to help them understand importance of such issues through various events.

The project came into being as a formal and overt start of Mike's initial campaign of dedicated seminars titled "Can I Kiss you?", in 1991, that focused on getting the participants to focus on clear communication via asking first as opposed to mind reading.

As a result of a series of events regarding the cause, the founder Mike Domitrz and The Center for Respect received media attention, interviews and coverage.

== Voices of Courage Project ==
12 survivors of sexual assault share their journeys from being raped to now living as survivors. This resource is available in paperback and in audio files (the survivors read their own chapters to the listener). The awareness of sexual assault provided by survivors aids in prevention and eradication of sexual violence and/or support survivors of sexual assault.
