= Phi Beta Delta =

Delta Phi Epsilon (ΔΦΕ) may refer to:

- Phi Beta Delta (fraternity), the social fraternity that was founded in 1912 and merged with Pi Lambda Phi in 1941
- Phi Beta Delta (honor society), the international honor society that was founded in 1986
