= Mike Domitrz =

- Occupations: Author, Publisher, Educator
- Known for: The Center for Respect
- Notable work: Voices of Courage, Can I Kiss You?
- Website: centerforrespect.com

Mike Domitrz is an American educator, author, publisher, subject matter expert, speaker, and the founder of Center for Respect (formerly Date Safe Project), an organization with a mission to prevent sexual assaults, teach consent, instill bystander intervention, increase survivor support, and address societal influences and expectations by building a culture of respect for all.

== Career ==
Domitrz started his career as an educator in the field of sexual assault awareness in 1991 after his older sister became a victim of a sexual assault in 1989. Domitrz started campaigning towards prevention of such crimes, interviewed experts and by 2003 he founded the organization, The Center for Respect (formerly Date Safe Project). The organization produces educational programs and gives presentations at schools and military institutions to prevent the issue all together from occurring in the society. The program focuses on a consent through asking first, bystander intervention, and supporting survivors.

As a part of his campaign with the project, Domitrz has gotten teenagers, school students, college & university students, and military personnel to partake in his campaign to help them understand importance of such issues. With the Military, Domitrz has worked with all of the branches: Navy, Marines, Space Force, Air Force, Army, and the Coast Guard.

At K12 schools Domitrz also presents programs for parents for helping them to better equip their kids with skills and strategies for respecting their boundaries and the boundaries of others.

Domitrz started the campaign as a formal one, in 1991, as a dedicated seminar titled "Can I Kiss you?" that focused on getting the participants to focus on clear communication via asking first as opposed to mind reading. Domitrz received in-depth media attention, interviews and coverage once his seminar and campaign became a part of the larger project which helped deliver his message worldwide.

Domitrz is often brought in by US Military installations for helping leaders transform the culture around respect.

In 2008, Domitrz earned the Certified Speaking Professional (C.S.P.) designation from the National Speakers Association.

In 2022, the National Speakers Association inducted Mike Domitrz into their Hall-of-Fame with the C.P.A.E. recognition (Council of Peers Award of Excellence).

In 2023, Domitrz was invited to be the Commencement Speaker at the University of Wisconsin-Whitewater where he graduated from in 1993.

In addition, Domitrz coaches entrepreneurs, authors, and speakers on how to be more impactful as a speaker and how to have more impactful speaking business.

In the late 1990s, Domitrz was a successful high school coach. In 1998, he was recognized as the WIAA Division I Coach of the Year for Men's Swimming Diving after leading Homestead High School to their first ever State Championship Title. Both the Boys and Girls teams were ranked 5th in the country during the 1997–1998 school year. The boys team would go on to win 4 consecutive state championships.

Domitrz is the father of 4 sons, married 30 years to Karen Domitrz, and they have 3 grandchildren.
