= Stanley Tolliver =

American lawyer and activist (1925–2011)

- Born: Stanley Eugene Tolliver Sr. October 29, 1925; Cleveland, Ohio, US
- Died: January 3, 2011 (aged 85); Cleveland, Ohio, U.S.
- Education: Baldwin - Wallace College, B.A. 1948; John Marshall School of Law, LLB 1951, LLD 1968, and J.D. 1969
- Occupation: Attorney
- Known for: Civil rights activist

Stanley Eugene Tolliver Sr. (October 29, 1925 – January 3, 2011) was an African-American attorney, school board president, and civil rights activist. He was a legal counsel for Martin Luther King Jr., the Southern Christian Leadership Conference, the Congress of Racial Equality, Fred Ahmed Evans, and students charged in the Kent State shootings. He was also the founder of Beta Sigma Tau, the first national collegiate fraternity that was interracial and interreligious.

== Early life ==
Toliver was born in Cleveland, Ohio, on October 29, 1925. His parents were Edna and Eugene Tolliver. He graduated from East Technical High School in 1944. During high school, he won the state championship in the 440-yard dash and the Ohio State Vocal Contest. His early hobbies were playing the violin and heavyweight boxing.

After graduation, he went on to earn his bachelor's degree at Baldwin-Wallace College (now Baldwin Wallace University) in 1948. During his time there, he majored in opera, ran on a relay team with Olympic gold medalist Harrison Dillard and was the founding president of Beta Sigma Tau, a pioneering interracial and interreligious fraternity that merged into Pi Lambda Phi.

Tolliver attended the John Marshall School of Law (now the Cleveland State University College of Law) LLB degree in 1951. He was drafted into the U.S. Army, serving as a private in the Counterintelligence Corps from 1951 to 1953. He passed his bar exam in 1953, while still in the Army. He returned to the John Marshall School of Law, earning a Legum Doctor (LLD) degree in 1968 and a Juris Doctor (J.D.) degree in 1969.

== Career ==
In 1965, Tolliver and Cleveland attorney Harold Tiktin were two of the legions of voting rights activists who descended on the American South to end black disenfranchisement. They volunteered there for a week, assisting as legal advisors to those who were attempting to register to vote for the first time, following the passage of the Voting Rights Act of 1965. He served as legal counsel for Martin Luther King Jr., the Southern Christian Leadership Conference, and the Congress of Racial Equality.

From its inception, Tolliver's law practice was characterized by an audacious defense of underdogs. Sometimes Tolliver met with failure, as with Melvin Bay Guyon, who killed FBI Agent Johnnie Oliver, or Mark DiMarco, who kidnapped and murdered Mary Jo Pesho in the 1990s.

In 1968, he represented Fred Ahmed Evans, who was convicted of murder in a Glenville Shootout with police. During the case, Ahmed Evans' brother William "Bootsie" was shot to death in the doorway of Tolliver's Quincy Avenue office. Police did not charge the shooter and said he was thwarting a robbery. Tolliver occasionally had a contentious relationship with law departments and often accused police of misconduct and prosecutors of selectively pursuing convictions. He also believed that police who killed someone should undergo alcohol tests as promptly as possible, as civilian suspects are required to. In 1968, shotgun blasts from a drive-by shooting barely missed family members in the living room of his house.

In 1970, Tolliver became the only African American attorney involved in the defense of the students charged in the Kent State shootings. Together with other Ohioans, Tolliver also led the call for the Cleveland Public Schools to desegregate. In 1977 he was admitted to the U.S. Supreme Court.

After state and local boards of education were found guilty of operating a segregated school system, Tolliver was appointed to the Committee on the Office of School Monitoring and Community Relations in 1978.

In 1981, he was elected to membership on the Cleveland Board of Education and in his twelve years of service, was elected board President twice. Beginning with this appointment, he often spoke on the value of more parental involvement in the lives of Cleveland schoolchildren and was firmly entrenched in the issues of civil rights in the community. Tolliver was president of the Norman S. Minor Bar Association and the local chapter of the National Conference of Black Lawyers.

== Honors ==
In 1978, Tolliver received the Outstanding Alumnus Award from Baldwin-Wallace College and was inducted into the East Technical High School’s Athletic Hall of Fame. He was awarded the Cleveland Chapter's NAACP Freedom Award in 2000. A street was named after him in Cleveland.

== Personal life ==
Tolliver was married to the former Dorothy Olivia Greenwood in 1951. They remained married for 49 years until she died in 2001 and had three children: Stephanie Tolliver, Sherrie Tolliver, and Stanley Tolliver Jr.

A lifelong runner, Tolliver completed a marathon in Hawaii in his 50s, won a 400-meter race at a Senior Olympics, and jogged through University Circle in his 80s. Tolliver served as Chairman of the Board of Trustees at Antioch Baptist Church where he was also a soloist in the Sanctuary choir, the aGospel choirs, and the Men's Chorus. He was also a lifelong member of the NAACP. He also collected wide-brimmed hats.

Tolliver hosted the weekly radio show, "Conversations with Stanley E. Tolliver, Sr." on WERE-AM. The show took telephone calls from listeners and consisted of a dialogue about politics and events in Cleveland, with emphasis on the plight of poor people and the effort to improve the lives of minorities and include black history in the school curriculum.

Tolliver died on the morning of January 3, 2011, at the Stokes Cleveland VA Medical Center due to complications from congestive heart failure (it was erroneously stated in the news that he died from cancer). He was 85 years old.
