= Green Dot Bystander Intervention =

Bystander violence prevention education approach

Green Dot Bystander Intervention is a bystander education approach that aims to prevent violence with the help of bystanders. It is built on the premise that violence can be measurably and systematically reduced within a community. Bystander intervention as a way of violence prevention programs are becoming popular within society. Its mission is to reduce power-based violence by being a proactive bystander and a reactive bystander.

== History ==
Title IX of the 1972 Education Amendment is a tool meant to combat campus violence. The law requires colleges and universities to fight gender-based violence, harassment, and respond to the needs of survivors promoting equal educational access. The Green Dot Bystander Intervention Program was founded in 2006 by Dr. Dorothy Edwards. The program trains people about sexual assault and domestic violence on college campuses, primary and secondary schools, and communities. It develops and offers training for sexual assault and domestic violence. The method teaches students to intervene by using the 3 D's: Direct, Delegating the responsibility to others, and creating a Distraction to defuse a potentially dangerous situation. As described by Green Dot an example of this is in a situation at a party, intervening could mean that instead of calling out an inebriated student, an individual can create a distraction by "accidentally" spilling their drink on a potential aggressor.

Prior to creating the program, Edwards worked as the University of Kentucky's Violence Intervention and Prevention Director where she discovered that individuals were not sure how to respond when witnessing a potential sexual assault. In her first year of running the program she trained 10 individuals, but by the time she left the University of Kentucky she was training 3,500 students and volunteers. The initiative led by Dr. Edwards was supported by a new focus on bystanders in The White House. Green Dot, Bringing in the Bystander, and Coaching Boys Into Men are preventative bystander programs that have begun to make cultural changes.

=== Sexual assault in education ===
Sexual violence in schools and on campuses is a pressing civil rights issue. According to the National Women's Law Center students who suffer from sexual assault and harassment are deprived the liberty of equal education. A majority of sexual assaults involving college students also involve drugs and alcohol. A female or male who is incapacitated due to drugs and alcohol is legally incapable of giving consent and someone who has sex with an incapacitated person can be prosecuted for rape.

== Purpose ==
The goal of Green Dot is to implement a bystander intervention strategy that prevents and reduces power-based personal violence. Power-based violence includes: sexual violence, domestic violence, dating violence, stalking, child abuse, elder abuse, and bullying. The curriculum is created from the concepts and lessons learned through research and theory across disciplines including: violence against women, diffusion of innovation, public health, social networking, psychology, bystander dynamics, perpetration, and marketing/advertising.

A Green Dot is a behavior, choice, or action that promotes safety for everyone. It communicates intolerance for sexual violence, dating violence, and stalking. The goal is to promote safety on college campuses.

== Training ==
Green Dot develops programs, strategies, curriculum, and training courses designed to address power-based personal violence across environments. Training strategies include: strategic planning, bystander mobilization, communication, and coalition building. The program provides training courses for leadership and professionals that focus on the core areas necessary for successful implementation of the program.

The Green Dot bystander program uses four training modules to educate bystanders on their impact.

1. The first module provides bystanders with an overview of the strategy, where key definitions and strategies are discussed.
2. The second module reviews the observable behaviors associated with the major forms of power-based violence and educates about how to recognize potential dangerous or harmful situations.
3. Module three educates bystanders on obstacles within themselves that stop them from intervening.
  - There are three major categories of influence it uses:
    - The categories are personal, relationship, and general issues, which impact the way in which individuals intervene. Personal characteristics may include being shy, fearful, or uncertain and not wanting to risk embarrassment. Relationship characteristics involve not wanting to upset friends or a party policer. General issues include the belief that someone else will intervene, the risk of embarrassment, or creating a scene.
4. Module four focuses on building skills and generating confidence in the performance of the program.
  - There are two types of Green Dots: proactive and reactive. The goal of proactive Green Dots is to set the two norms that are communicated: violence will not be tolerated and everyone is expected to do his or her part to contribute to fostering a safe community. Reactive Green Dots are done in reaction to seeing concerning behavior or potential dangers, either to stop them from happening or decrease the likelihood they will get worse.

The heart of the Green Dot Bystander Intervention program are the 3 D's: direct, distract, and delegate. Direct interaction with the potential perpetrator or victim can be used to address concern. Through Distraction a bystander can create a diversion to diffuse the potentially problematic situation. Lastly, through delegation a bystander can ask for someone else to help intervene in the situation. The 3 D's work in situations of high risk to act as reactive Green Dots.

Examples of proactive Green Dots are creating social media campaigns, checking-in with friends, promoting awareness, and hosting green dot sports games.

Examples of reactive Green Dots include: directly confronting a situation, distracting by changing the conversation and the energy of the interaction or by distracting the individuals, or delegating by finding someone who will be more successful in fixing the problem (bar tender, other friends, Police officer, etc.)

=== Case studies ===
Ann Coker at the University of Kentucky's Center for Research on Violence Against Women (CRVAW) led a 2014 study pertaining to the effectiveness at Green Dots' reduction of sexual violence. In the study, CRVAW found a greater than 50% reduction in the self-reported frequency of sexual violence perpetration by students at schools that received Green Dot training. The CRVAW study also found a 40% reduction in self-reported frequency of total violence perpetration including sexual violence, sexual harassment, stalking, and dating violence. Ann Coker, and the CRVAW team identify violence prevention as a public health priority.

A 2011 study of 2,504 college undergraduate students between 18 and 24 looked at the impact of bystander intervention on college campuses. The study found that 46% of the students surveyed had heard a Green Dot speech on their college campus. Out of the sample size surveyed, only 14% had received active bystander training in the past two years. Students trained in Green Dot bystander intervention reported engaging in significantly more bystander behaviors and observing more self-reported active bystander behaviors compared to non-trained students. Those receiving bystander intervention training appeared to report more active bystander behaviors than those simply hearing a Green Dot speech, and both intervention groups reported more observed and active bystander behaviors than non-exposed students.
