= Beta Sigma Rho =

American Jewish fraternity (1910–1972)

- ΒΣΡ
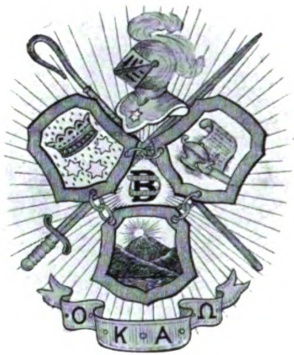
- Founded: October 12, 1910; 116 years ago Cornell University
- Type: Social
- Former affiliation: NIC
- Status: Merged
- Merge date: December 12, 1972
- Successor: Pi Lambda Phi
- Emphasis: Jewish, originally
- Scope: National
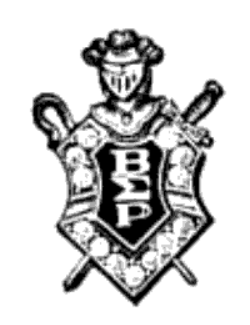
- Member badge
- Colors: Blue and Gold
- Publication: The Beta Sigma Rho New Letter
- Chapters: 15
- Members: 5,380 lifetime
- Headquarters: New York City, New York; United States

Beta Sigma Rho (ΒΣΡ) was an American social fraternity founded at Cornell University in 1910. Most of its active chapters were absorbed into Pi Lambda Phi fraternity in 1972.

== History ==
Beta Sigma Rho was formed on October 12, 1910, at Cornell University. It was originally named Beta Samach (Βס), "the Greek Beta and the Hebrew Samach suggesting the application of the Greek society idea to the social and cultural life of the Jewish undergraduate". Its founders were Nathaniel E. Koenig, Lester D. Krohn, M. H. Milman, and M. M. Milman.

Beta Samach was notable for a lack of initiation fees and dues and was slow to establish a constitution, ritual or the other surface attributes standard to other fraternal organizations. No formal expansion program existed for its first decade even while a Beta chapter emerged at Penn State, and Gamma chapter at Columbia. By the end of its first decade, growing pressure on the fraternity's trustees by its members resulted in the establishment of a structure of dues and fees, along with a constitution and new operational program.

On April 21, 1920, pragmatic adjustments resulted in a recasting of Beta Samach with a new name, Beta Sigma Rho, around the time of the establishment of its Delta chapter at Buffalo.

During the fraternity's approximately 62-year history, it eventually chartered chapters at fifteen colleges, including two in Canada. The fraternity gradually removed religious requirements from its governing documents, reflecting this change in its ritual in 1950.

=== Merger ===
Beta Sigma Rho merged with Pi Lambda Phi on December 12, 1972, whose records indicate the latter fraternity gained five active chapters and merged two chapters. (Note: Note that Pi Lambda Phi participated in two mergers during this period, adding similarly named fraternities Beta Sigma Tau and Beta Sigma Rho to its rolls. An earlier merger had occurred in 1941 with the absorption of Phi Beta Delta.) At Cornell, the original Beta Sigma Rho house survived the merger, with the Pi Lambda Phi house folding, and the Beta Sig house was renamed Pi Lambda Phi starting the next school year. That Pi Lam chapter folded several years later.

The chapter at Pennsylvania State University's main campus would not agree to a merger with the existing Pi Lambda Phi chapter on the campus, therefore the Beta chapter of Beta Sigma Rho became the local fraternity Beta Sigma Beta.

At the time of the merger, Beta Sigma Rho's total membership was 5,380. Its headquarters were in New York City.

== Symbols ==
The badge was a shepherd's staff crossed with a sword behind a shield. A plumed helmet was atop the shield, with 13 pearls placed on the circumference, and the letters ΒΣΡ placed vertically. The badge was gold, highlighted with black.

Colors of the society were blue and gold. Its publication was The Beta Sigma Rho New Letter.

== Chapters ==
These were the chapters of Beta Sigma Rho.

Chapter	Charter date and range	Institution	Location	Status	Ref.
Alpha	October 12, 1910 – 1972	Cornell University	Ithaca, New York	Merged (ΠΛΦ)	
Beta	1913–1972	Pennsylvania State University	University Park, Pennsylvania	Withdrew	(Note: Withdrew and became Beta Sigma Beta (local). It remains active as of August 2021.)
Gamma	1919–1965	Columbia University	New York City, New York	Inactive	
Delta	1920–196x ?	University at Buffalo	Buffalo, New York	Inactive	
Epsilon	1922–1972	University of Pennsylvania	Philadelphia, Pennsylvania	Merged (ΠΛΦ)	
Zeta	1922–1972	Carnegie Mellon University	Pittsburgh, Pennsylvania	Merged (ΠΛΦ)	(Note: This chapter had originated as Alpha Pi (local) in 1919.)
Eta	1930–19xx ?	University of Toronto	Toronto, Ontario, Canada	Inactive	
Theta	1935–1972	Rutgers University–Newark	Newark, New Jersey	Merged (ΠΛΦ)	(Note: This chapter had originated as "Theta House" (local) in 1933.)
Iota	1945–1972	University of Western Ontario	London, Ontario, Canada	Merged (ΠΛΦ)	
Kappa	1949–1952	University of Kentucky	Lexington, Kentucky	Inactive	
Lambda	1950–1972	Syracuse University	Syracuse, New York	Merged (ΠΛΦ)	
Mu	1958–1963	University of Miami	Coral Gables, Florida	Inactive	
Nu	1962–1965	New York University	New York City, New York	Inactive	
Xi	1964–1972	City College of New York	New York City, New York	Withdrew	(Note: Chapter withdrew at the time of the national merger and became a location fraternity. Baird's Manual does not list the successor name; appears to have soon dissipated.)
Omicron	1969–1972	St. John's University	New York City, New York	Merged (ΠΛΦ)	

== See also ==
- List of social fraternities
- List of Jewish fraternities and sororities
- Beta Sigma Tau
- Phi Beta Delta
- Pi Lambda Phi
