= Omicron Alpha Tau =

Defunct North American collegiate Jewish fraternity

- ΟΑΤ
- Founded: 1912; 114 years ago Cornell University
- Type: Social
- Former affiliation: NIC
- Status: Merged
- Merge date: 1934
- Successor: Tau Delta Phi
- Emphasis: Jewish
- Scope: National
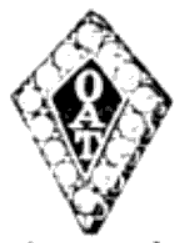
- Member badge
- Colors: Orange and Blue
- Flower: Goldenrod
- Publication: OAT Digest; The Oath
- Chapters: 21 ?
- Headquarters: United States

Omicron Alpha Tau (ΟΑΤ) was an historically Jewish fraternity founded in 1912. It merged with Tau Delta Phi in 1934.

== History ==
Omicron Alpha Tau was founded at Cornell University in the Spring of 1912. Its founders were Benjamin Brickman, James Castelle, Jack Grossman, Abraham Haibloom, Jules Jokel, Joseph Seidlin, and Nat Shiren. At the time, the founders had no intention of forming a national Greek letter fraternity. Omicron Alpha Tau remained a local fraternity until 1915 when David Browman founded a second chapter at the Columbia University College of Dental and Oral Surgery in New York City.

Growth continued throughout New York, extending to eastern and southern schools. Its first Midwest chapter was established in 1924 at Valparaiso University. The fraternity became an international organization in 1927 with the formation of the Rho chapter at McGill University in Montreal. Additional Midwestern chapters were also established at the University of Illinois and the University of Chicago, also in 1927. Upsilon chapter was formed in 1928 at Marquette University; this may have been the last chapter formed; Baird's Manual of American College Fraternities notes "at least eighteen chapters were installed", ending its list with Upsilon. However, the 1930 edition of The Illio yearbook notes there were 21 chapters .

The fraternity held its ninth convention in Milwaukee, Wisconsin on April 28, 1935, with the Marquette chapter as host.

Baird's Manual notes that several chapters died during the Great Depression, predicating national dissolution. In 1934, Tau Delta Phi absorbed the chapters at Rutgers University, New York University, Marquette, and Cornell. The chapter at Syracuse University was absorbed by Phi Epsilon Pi. The chapter at the University of Pennsylvania merged into Phi Beta Delta.

== Symbols and traditions ==
The fraternity's colors were orange and blue. Its flower was the goldenrod.

Omicron Alpha Tau was particularly known for their houses having adherence to traditional Jewish dietary laws. Several chapters maintained kosher kitchens. At Cornell, it was known as "the most Jewish of fraternities."

One of the songs of the fraternity was "Onward Our O.A.T.":

Onward our O.A.T.
Forever onward greater to be,
For with the Orange and Blue
Leading sons ever true
We fear no adversity.
Lead us, Oh, Orange and Blue
Oh lead us on to honor you,
For where'er your sons may be,
We shall always fight for thee,
Oh, Onward Our O.A.T.

The fraternity's magazine, as of 1923, was called the OAT Digest and was distributed monthly. Later, the magazine's name was changed to The Oath and was issued three times a year.

== Chapters ==
The chapters of Omicron Alpha Tau include:

Chapter	Charter date and range	Institution	Location	Status	Ref.
Alpha	1912–1934	Cornell University	Ithaca, New York	Merged (ΤΔΦ)	(Note: Became the Tau Beta chapter of Tau Delta Phi.)
Beta	1915–1925	Columbia University College of Dental and Oral Surgery	New York, New York	Consolidated	(Note: Baird's Manual says this chapter started in 1913.) (Note: In 1925, Beta chapter consolidated with Gamma chapter, which was formed the following year, also at Columbia.)
Gamma	1916–1927	Columbia University	New York, New York	Inactive	(Note: Gamma chapter was dormant by 1927 or earlier.)
Delta	1916–1918	University of Kentucky	Lexington, Kentucky	Inactive	(Note: Delta chapter was dormant by 1918 or earlier.)
Epsilon	1919–1934	New York University	New York, New York	Merged (ΤΔΦ)	(Note: Absorbed by the Gamma chapter of Tau Delta Phi.)
Zeta	1920–1930	Syracuse University	Syracuse, New York	Merged (ΦΕΠ)	(Note: May have been absorbed in 1930 by the Chi chapter of Phi Epsilon Pi. Baird's records are unclear.)
Iota	1921–19xx ?	Harvard University	Cambridge, Massachusetts	Inactive	
Theta	1922–19xx ?	Lafayette College	Easton, Pennsylvania	Inactive	
Kappa	1922–19xx ?	University of Connecticut	Storrs, Connecticut	Inactive	
Lambda	1922–1934	University of Pennsylvania	Philadelphia, Pennsylvania	Merged (ΦΒΔ)	(Note: Joined the Eta chapter of Phi Beta Delta, which later merged with Pi Lambda Phi.)
Mu	1922–19xx ?	Fordham University	New York, New York	Inactive	
Nu	1924–1930	Valparaiso University	Valparaiso, Indiana	Inactive	
Xi	1925–19xx ?	University of Buffalo	Buffalo, New York	Inactive	
Omicron	1927–19xx ?	University of Alabama	Tuscaloosa, Alabama	Inactive	
Pi	1927–1932	University of Illinois	Urbana, Illinois	Inactive	
Rho	1927–1934	McGill University	Montreal, Quebec	Inactive	(Note: The Almanac notes the formation of this chapter in 1917, but listed in order as if it was created in 1927. This appears to be a typo; needs confirmation, perhaps with a check of the yearbooks.)
Sigma	1927–19xx	University of Chicago	Chicago, Illinois	Inactive	
Eta	1927–1934	Rutgers University	New Brunswick, New Jersey	Merged (ΤΔΦ)	(Note: Originally formed in 1925 as the Evergreen Club (local). It became the Tau Gamma chapter of Tau Delta Phi.)
Tau	1928–1932	George Washington University	Washington, D.C.	Inactive	
Upsilon	1928–1934	Marquette University	Marquette, Wisconsin	Inactive	(Note: Originally formed in 1927 as Sigma Beta Tau (local). The name similarity with the non-sectarian national of that same name appears to have been coincidental.) (Note: One reference noted that Upsilon chapter became a Tau Delta Phi chapter but this is not supported by the Baird's Manual. This appears to have been an error; the Marquette chapter met its demise in the same year as other chapters merged and the national ceased operations.)

== Notable members ==
- David Sarnoff (Honorary), businessman

== See also ==
- List of Jewish fraternities and sororities
