= University of Kentucky Wesley Foundation =

Methodist campus ministry

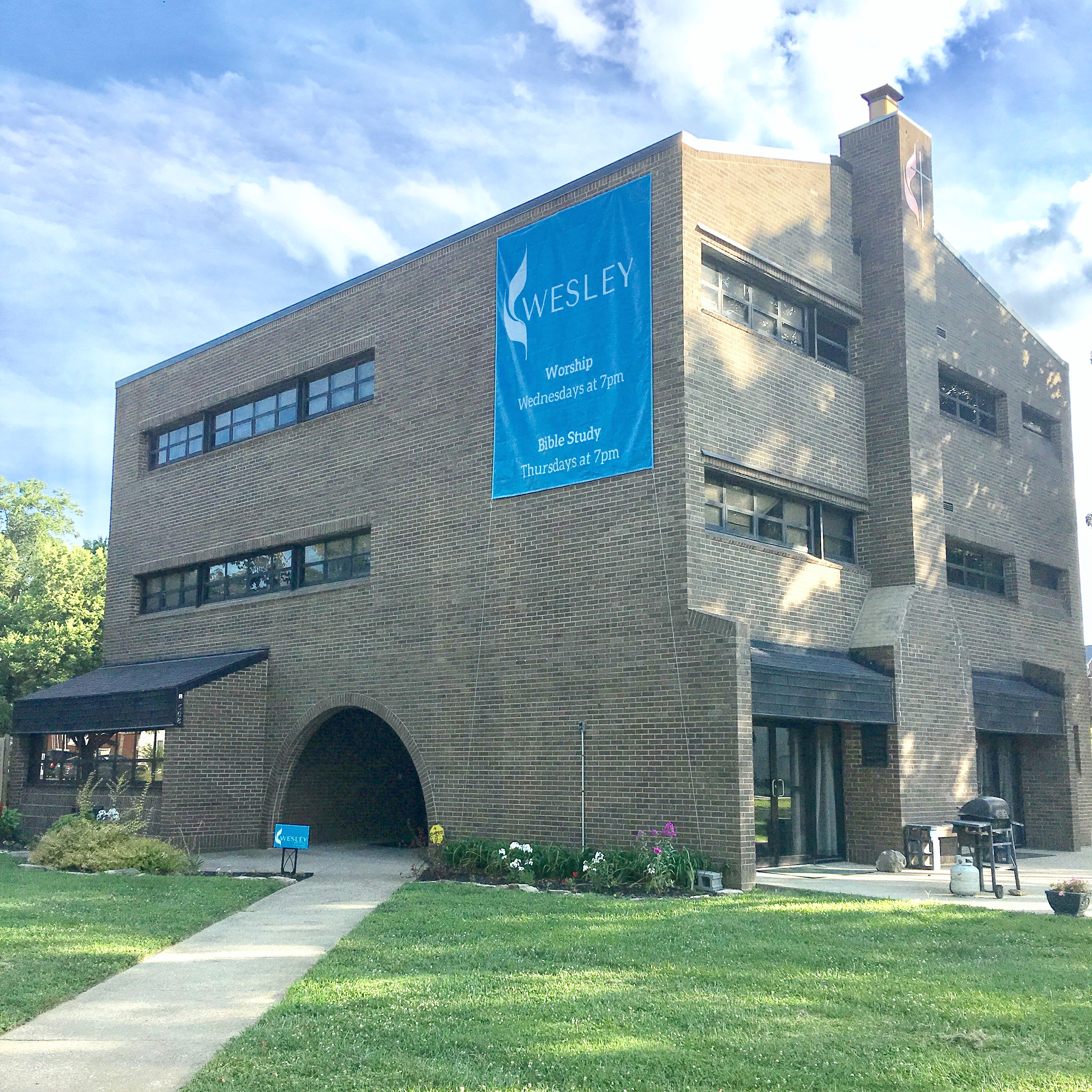

The University of Kentucky Wesley Foundation is a United Methodist campus ministry and Christian living community for students.

== Living community ==
The Wesley Foundation has two residential floors, one holding 24 women and one holding 24 men. Two members of the student leadership team serve as men's and women's RA, and share the responsibility of overseeing day-to-day aspects of the residential ministry.

== Ministry and missions ==
The Wesley Foundation is also a campus ministry that provides a weekly worship service, free dinners, events, small groups, and co-ed Bible studies. Its mission is to "connect, develop, and send a new generation of Christian leaders who will make disciples of Jesus Christ and transform the world".

The ministry is led by a director, an ordained minister in the United Methodist Church; an assistant director, usually a seminary student or recent graduate of the ministry; and a student leadership team of 7-12 students.

The Wesley Foundation also hosts many events that happen every year or every semester, including Fall Retreat, Thirst, 12 Days of Christmas, Love Week, Coffee House, and a campus-wide Worship Night held at the university's Singletary Center for the Arts.
