= Bystander intervention =

Type of training in tertiary education

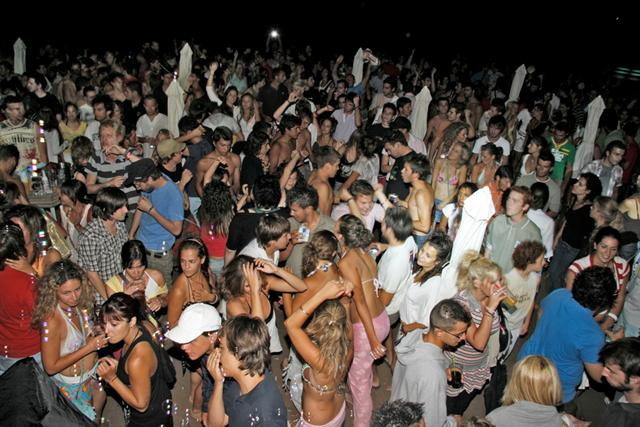
Bystander intervention training aims to teach people to intervene at parties and dances when they see a person making sexual advances on an intoxicated person.

Bystander intervention is a type of training used in post-secondary education institutions to prevent sexual assault or rape, binge drinking and harassment and unwanted comments of racist, homophobic, or transphobic nature. A bystander is a person who is present at an event, party, or other setting who notices a problematic situation, such as a someone making sexual advances on a drunk person. The bystander then takes on personal responsibility and takes action to intervene, with the goal of preventing the situation from escalating.

The bystander who is intervening has several options, including distracting either of the people, getting help from others, checking in later, or directly intervening. There are risks to bystander intervention; it can lead to fights, it can ruin the mood for the people who were "intervened" into, and it can lead to confrontations. Bystander intervention may also be called "bystander education", because the model is based on a system of educating trainers and leaders who will then go on to train people from their community.

== Prevention of sexual assault ==
One bystander intervention researcher suggests that a potential sexual assault should be stopped by pretending to spill a drink on a drunk person who is trying to make sexual moves on another intoxicated person, to distract him and "...stop bad behavior before it crosses the line from drunken partying to sexual assault". Advocates hope that bystander intervention programs can yield the same results on sexual assault that designated driver initiatives have had in reducing impaired driving; another similarity is that both programs do not discourage drinking itself, only the combination of drinking and law-breaking. Some US universities are introducing bystander education initiatives to comply with Title IX, which requires US universities which receive federal funding to not discriminate on basis of gender.

== Research ==
A study on bystander intervention by the University of New Hampshire showed that 38 percent of the men who participated in a bystander intervention campaign training said they intervened to stop a sexual assault, versus only 12 percent of the control group (who did not see the campaign). An Ohio University study compared men who took a bystander intervention session with a group of men who did not have the training; 1.5 percent of the bystander intervention participants said they had committed sexual assault over the last four months, versus 6.7 percent from the untrained group.

== See also ==
- Green Dot Bystander Intervention
- Bystander effect
