= Phi Beta Delta (fraternity) =

Defunct national collegiate fraternity

- ΦΒΔ
- Founded: April 4, 1912; 114 years ago Columbia University
- Type: Social
- Former affiliation: NIC
- Status: Merged
- Merge date: February 1, 1941
- Successor: Pi Lambda Phi
- Scope: National
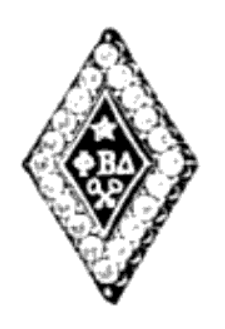
- Member badge
- Colors: Blue and Gold
- Symbol: star. crossed keys
- Flower: Hyacinth
- Jewel: Pearl
- Publication: What's Doing in Phi Beta Delta; The Tripod of Phi Beta Delta
- Chapters: 36 inactive
- Members: 1,800+ lifetime
- Headquarters: 36 Mill Plain Rd, Ste 309; Danbury, Connecticut 06811; United States

Phi Beta Delta (ΦΒΔ) was an American college social fraternity for Jewish students. It was founded at Columbia University in 1912. After chartering 36 chapters, the fraternity merged with Pi Lambda Phi in 1941.

== History ==
Phi Beta Delta was founded at Columbia University on April 12, 1912 as a college social fraternity for Jewish students. Its eight founders were David H. Cohen, Henry C. Fenton, William Haas, Darcy M. Heinemann, Joseph Michtom, Samuel Null, Julius Rudd, and Bernard Shapiro

The founders stated, "Its purpose is to inculcate among its membership a fine spirit of loyalty, activity, and scholarship toward their Alma Mater, to develop the highest ideals of conduct, and to promote a close fraternal bond through means of carefully selected associates."

While entering the ranks of national fraternities somewhat later than its national peers, the organization quickly grew, with chapters quickly formed at several eastern schools. In 1934, Phi Beta Delta absorbed the UPenn chapter of Omicron Alpha Tau, a smaller Jewish fraternity that was dispersing that year. This group either merged with the existing Phi Beta Delta chapter on the campus or re-established it. Four of ΟΑΤ's other chapters went to Tau Delta Phi.

In 1930, Phi Beta Delta had initiated 1,811 members and chartered 32 chapters, with three being inactive. Ten chapters owned houses. The fraternity had alumni clubs in Boston, Chicago, Denver, Los Angeles, New Jersey, New York City, Oklahoma, Philadelphia, St. Louis, and Western Pennsylvania.

Phi Beta Delta effectively merged into Pi Lambda Phi on February 1, 1941. Baird's Manual (19th edition) notes the merger documents were signed on October 1, 1940. At the time, Pi Lambda Phi had twenty active chapters, and Phi Beta Delta had sixteen. Considering duplications, the combined post-merger fraternity had a net of 33 chapters. All members and alumni of Phi Beta Delta were admitted into Pi Lambda Phi.

== Symbols ==
The Phi Beta Delta badge was diamond-shaped and edged with twenty pearls. Across the center, it displayed the Greek letters ΦΒΔ in gold on a blue background. Above the letters was a five-pointed star, and below were two crossed keys.

The fraternity's colors were blue and gold. Its jewel was the pearl. Its flower was the hyacinth. Its publications were the monthly What's Doing in Phi Beta Delta and the quarterly magazine The Tripod of Phi Beta Delta.

== Chapters ==
Following are the chapters of Phi Beta Delta, listed in the order of formation, with inactive chapters and institutions are in italics.

| Chapter | Charter date and range | Institution | Location | Status | Ref. |
|---|---|---|---|---|---|
| Alpha | April 5, 1912 – 1929 | Columbia University | New York City, New York | Inactive | |
| Gamma | 1912–1935 | City College of New York | New York City, New York | Inactive | |
| Lambda | 1912–1926 | New York College of Dentistry | New York City, New York | Inactive | (Note: Chapter went inactive when the College of Dentistry merged with New York University.) |
| Sigma | 1913–1918, 1934–1941 | Cornell University | Ithaca, New York | Merged (ΠΛΦ) | (Note: Chapter went inactive during World War I when all of its members enlisted. In 1934, the chapter reformed from Phi Delta Mu (local), established in 1925. With the national merger, it joined the NY Delta chapter of Pi Lambda Phi.) |
| Zeta | 1915–1934 | New York University | New York City, New York | Inactive | |
| Beta | 1916–1935 | Fordham University | New York City, New York | Inactive | |
| Eta | 1919–1941 | University of Pennsylvania | Philadelphia, Pennsylvania | Merged (ΠΛΦ) | (Note: Eta absorbed the Lambda chapter of Omicron Alpha Tau in 1934 when that national fraternity disbanded. With the national merger, Eta joined the PA Epsilon Zeta chapter of Pi Lambda Phi.) |
| Epsilon | 1919–1939 | University of Chicago | Chicago, Illinois | Inactive | (Note: Chapter formed from Kappa Omega (local).) |
| Theta | 1920–1941 | Massachusetts Institute of Technology | Boston, Massachusetts | Merged (ΠΛΦ) | (Note: With the national merger, the chapter restored the Theta chapter of Pi Lambda Phi.) |
| Mu | 1920–1941 | University of Cincinnati | Cincinnati, Ohio | Merged (ΠΛΦ) | (Note: With the national merger, the chapter became the OH Mu chapter of Pi Lambda Phi.) |
| Nu | 1920–1935 | Polytechnic Institute of New York (Tandon) | New York City, New York | Inactive | (Note: Chapter formed from Lambda Beta (local).) |
| Kappa | 1921–1941 | University of Southern California | Los Angeles, California | Merged (ΠΛΦ) | (Note: With the national merger, the chapter became the CA Kappa chapter of Pi Lambda Phi.) |
| Omicron | 1921–1941 | University of Michigan | Ann Arbor, Michigan | Merged (ΠΛΦ) | (Note: With the national merger, the chapter joined the MI Epsilon chapter of Pi Lambda Phi.) |
| Rho | 1921–1925 | Worcester Polytechnic Institute | Worcester, Massachusetts | Inactive | |
| Xi | 1921–1930 | Tufts University | Medford, Massachusetts | Inactive | |
| Pi | 1921–1941 | Washington University in St. Louis | St. Louis, Missouri | Merged (ΠΛΦ) | (Note: With the national merger, the chapter became the MO Pi chapter of Pi Lambda Phi.) |
| Tau | 1922–1941 | University of California, Berkeley | Berkeley, California | Merged (ΠΛΦ) | (Note: With the national merger, the chapter became the CA Tau chapter of Pi Lambda Phi.) |
| Upsilon | 1922–1941 | University of California, Los Angeles | Los Angeles, California | Merged (ΠΛΦ) | (Note: With the national merger, the chapter became the CA Upsilon chapter of Pi Lambda Phi.) |
| Iota | 1922–1941 | University of Oklahoma | Norman, Oklahoma | Merged (ΠΛΦ) | (Note: Chapter formed from Sigma Beta Tau (local), established in 1921. With the national merger, it became the OK Iota chapter of Pi Lambda Phi.) |
| Phi | 1922–1936 | University of Iowa | Iowa City, Iowa | Inactive | |
| Chi | 1924–1934 | University of Wisconsin–Madison | Madison, Wisconsin | Inactive | (Note: Chapter formed from the Chi Club (local), established in 1922.) |
| Psi | 1924–1930 | Drake University | Des Moines, Iowa | Inactive | (Note: Chapter formed from Sigma Delta Phi (local), established in 1923.) |
| Delta | 1925–1941 | University of Florida | Gainesville, Florida | Merged (ΠΛΦ) | (Note: With the national merger, the chapter became the FL Delta chapter of Pi Lambda Phi.) |
| Omega | 1925–1931 | University of Pittsburgh | Pittsburgh, Pennsylvania | Inactive | (Note: Chapter formed from Delta Gamma Tau (local), established in 1923.) |
| Alpha Alpha | 1925–1933 | University of Minnesota | Minneapolis, Minnesota | Inactive | |
| Alpha Beta | 1927–1934 | University of Denver | Denver, Colorado | Inactive | (Note: Chapter formed from Alpha Beta Phi (local), established in 1922.) |
| Alpha Gamma | 1927–1933 | Lehigh University | Bethlehem, Pennsylvania | Inactive | (Note: Chapter formed from Omega Phi (local), established in 1926.) |
| Alpha Delta | 1927–1933, 19xx ?–1941 | Temple University | Philadelphia, Pennsylvania | Merged (ΠΛΦ) | (Note: Chapter formed from Sigma Iota Sigma (local), established in 1924. With the national merger, it became the PA Alpha Delta chapter of Pi Lambda Phi.) |
| Alpha Epsilon | 1927–1941 | Ohio State University | Columbus, Ohio | Merged (ΠΛΦ) | (Note: Chapter formed from Phi Delta Gamma (local), established in 1923. With the national merger, it became the OH Alpha Epsilon chapter of Pi Lambda Phi.) |
| Alpha Zeta | 1928–1941 | University of South Carolina | Columbia, South Carolina | Merged (ΠΛΦ) | (Note: Chapter formed from The Evergreen Club (local) in 1927. With the national merger, it became the SC Alpha Zeta chapter of Pi Lambda Phi) |
| Alpha Eta | 1928–1937 | University of Alabama | Tuscaloosa, Alabama | Inactive | (Note: Chapter formed from The Pioneers Club (local).) |
| Alpha Theta | 1928–1941 | Indiana University | Bloomington, Indiana | Merged (ΠΛΦ) | (Note: Chapter formed from Gamma Tau (local), established in 1927. With the national merger, it became the IN Alpha Theta chapter of Pi Lambda Phi) |
| Alpha Iota | 1931–1934 | University of Colorado | Boulder, Colorado | Inactive | (Note: Chapter formed from The Alpha Club (local), established in 1929.) |
| Alpha Kappa | 1934–1941 | University of Illinois Urbana-Champaign | Champaign, Illinois | Merged (ΠΛΦ) | (Note: Chapter formed from Delta Pi (local), established in 1925. With the national merger, it became the IL Tau Delta chapter of Pi Lambda Phi.) |

== Notable members ==
- Maurice Caro, Massachusetts State Legislature
- Richard Feynman (Theta, 1935) theoretical physicist
- Max Fisher (Alpha Epsilon) businessman and philanthropist
- Leopold Calvin Glass, Supreme Court of Pennsylvania
- Joseph L. Kun, judge on the Philadelphia Court of Common Pleas
- Louis B. Mayer, film producer and co-founder of Metro-Goldwyn-Mayer studios
- Aaron M Sakolski, author

== See also ==
- List of Jewish fraternities and sororities
- List of social fraternities
