= Beta Sigma Tau =

American collegiate fraternity (1948–1960)

- ΒΣΤ
- Founded: May 1948; 78 years ago Roosevelt University
- Type: Social
- Affiliation: Independent
- Status: Merged
- Merge date: November 1, 1960
- Successor: Pi Lambda Phi
- Emphasis: Non-sectarian, interracial
- Scope: National
- Chapters: 18
- Headquarters: United States

Beta Sigma Tau (ΒΣΤ) was an American social fraternity founded in 1948 in Chicago, Illinois. It was the first national fraternity that was interracial and interreligious. It formed eighteen chapters before merging with Pi Lambda Phi fraternity in 1960.

== History ==
Stanley Tolliver of Baldwin Wallace College was the founder of Beta Sigma Tau. In May 1948, he called a meeting of twelve intercultural fraternities during the National Conference of Intercultural Fraternities held at Roosevelt University in Chicago, Illinois. They drafted the constitution and structure of Beta Sigma Tau, new national intercultural fraternity. In November 1948, the groups met again and completed the organization of Beta Sigma Tau. Once consolicated, the new fraternity consisted of sixteen chapters from New York to California.

Beta Sigma Tau was the first national social college fraternity that was "open to all Races and Religions". According to its constitutional preamble, Beta Sigma Tau was founded "to level, not raise barriers among people", and was based "upon a brotherhood and democracy which transcends racial, national, and religious differences".

The fraternity expanded to additional campuses, expanding to at least eighteen chapters. However, Beta Sigma Tau merged into Pi Lambda Phi on November 1, 1960. At the time of the merger, two chapters reverted to local status and later joined other national fraternities. The chapter at Tri-State University was not able to participate in the merger because the university had lost its accreditation at the time.

== Chapters ==
Beta Sigma Tau included the following collegiate chapters.

Name	Charter date and range	Institution	Location	Status	Ref.
Baldwin-Wallace	May 1948 – November 1, 1960	Baldwin Wallace University	Berea, Ohio	Merged (ΠΛΦ)	(Note: Chapter formed from Sigma Sigma Epsilon (local), established in April 1946. It became the OH Beta Tau chapter of Pi Gamma Phi.)
SUNY, Buffalo	1948–1960	University at Buffalo	Buffalo, New York	Inactive	(Note: Chapter formed from Omega Phi Delta (local), established in 1947.)
Ohio State	1948 – November 1, 1960	Ohio State University	Columbus, Ohio	Merged (ΠΛΦ)	(Note: Chapter formed from Lambda Alpha Gamma (local), established in 1947. With the national merger, it re-established the OH Alpha Epsilon chapter of Pi Gamma Phi.)
Ohio Wesleyan	1948 – November 1, 1960	Ohio Wesleyan University	Delaware, Ohio	Merged (ΠΛΦ)	(Note: Chapter formed from Iota Chi Epsilon (local), established in 1947. With the national merger, it became the OH Beta Sigma chapter of Pi Lambda Phi.)
Roosevelt	1948–1960	Roosevelt University	Chicago, Illinois	Inactive	(Note: Chapter formed from Delta Chi Alpha (local), established in 1948.)
Santa Barbara	1948–1953	University of California, Santa Barbara	Santa Barbara County, California	Inactive	
Cal Berkeley	1948–1954	University of California, Berkeley	Berkeley, California	Inactive	
Lincoln (PA)	1949–195x ?	Lincoln University	Oxford, Pennsylvania	Inactive	
New Mexico Highlands	1949–1952	New Mexico Highlands University	Las Vegas, New Mexico	Inactive	
Morgan State	1949–195x ?	Morgan State University	Baltimore, Maryland	Inactive	
Morgan State	1949–195x ?	Johns Hopkins University	Baltimore, Maryland	Inactive	
Morgan State	1949–195x ?	Loyola College of Maryland	Baltimore, Maryland	Inactive	
Colorado	1949 – November 1, 1960	University of Colorado Boulder	Boulder, Colorado	Merged (ΠΛΦ)	(Note: With the national merger, it became the CO Alpha Iota chapter of Pi Lambda Phi.)
Southern California	1949–1955	University of Southern California	Los Angeles, California	Inactive	
Columbia	1950 – November 1, 1960	Columbia University	New York City, New York	Merged (ΠΛΦ)	(Note: With the national merger, it joined the Alpha chapter of Pi Gamma Phi.)
Tri-State	1950–1960	Tri-State University	Angola, Indiana	Withdrew (local)	(Note: Chapter formed from Theta Mu Phi (local), established in 1948. While the chapter was included in the national merger preparations, Tri State was not accredited at the time and could not have a Pi Lambda Phi chapter under the National Interfraternity Conference rules. As a result, the chapter was forced to withdraw from ΒΣΤ; it became Beta Sigma Chi (local), lasting as a local organization until 1966 when it revived the Beta-Epsilon chapter of ΤΚΕ.)
Johns Hopkins	1951–1956	Johns Hopkins University	Baltimore, Maryland	Inactive	
Hobart	1951–1960	Hobart College	Geneva, New York	Withdrew (local)	(Note: Chapter formed from Gamma Sigma (local), established in 1948. With the national merger, it withdrew as Beta Sigma (local), becoming the NY Eta Chi chapter of Pi Lambda Phi in 1968.)
UCLA	1952 – November 1, 1960	University of California, Los Angeles	Los Angeles, California	Merged (ΠΛΦ)	(Note: With the national merger, the chapter was absorbed by the CA Upsilon of Pi Lambda Phi.)
Indiana Tech	1957–1960	Indiana Institute of Technology	Fort Wayne, Indiana	Withdrew (local)	(Note: Chapter formed from Theta Mu Phi (local), established in 1956. At the time of the national merger, the chapter withdrew as Theta Mu Phi (local). In 1966, it joined Sigma Pi as its Gamma-Kappa chapter.)

== Legacy ==
Beta Sigma Tau (local) was formed at the University of Toledos formed in 1996, influenced by the ideals of the original fraternity. This organization had no legal connection to Beta Sigma Tau national, nor to Pi Lambda Phi. By 2006, the Toledo group "swayed from its multicultural mission and folded as its founders and core leaders graduated."

== Notable members ==
- James Lawson – activist, professor, and key figure in the civil rights movement
- Stanley Tolliver – legal counsel for Martin Luther King Jr. and founder of Beta Sigma Tau
- Ezra F. Vogel – sociologist and professor of the social sciences at Harvard University

== See also ==
- List of social fraternities
