= Tau Delta Phi =

North American collegiate fraternity

- ΤΔΦ
- Founded: June 22, 1910; 116 years ago City College of New York
- Type: Social
- Affiliation: NIC
- Status: Active
- Scope: National
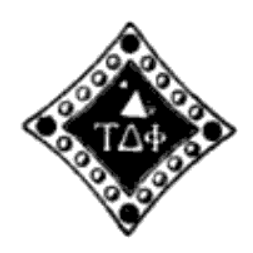
- Member badge
- Colors: Navy blue and White
- Symbol: Pyramid
- Flower: White Chrysanthemum
- Publication: The Pyramid
- Chapters: 5
- Headquarters: 1050 Connecticut Avenue NW, Suite 500; Washington D.C. 20036; United States
- Website: taudelt.net

Tau Delta Phi (ΤΔΦ), whose members are commonly known as Tau Delts, is a national social fraternity founded on June 22, 1910, in New York City. Since its inception, dozens of chapters have been founded and thousands of men initiated its membership. Today, the Tau Delta Phi fraternity operates five active chapters and colonies located primarily in the northeastern United States.

== History ==
=== Founding ===
The predecessor to Tau Delta Phi was called Phi Sigma Beta, a high school fraternity founded on June 22, 1910 by Jewish students at DeWitt Clinton High School. Phi Sigma Beta started as a fraternity for Jewish men who were otherwise barred from fraternity life at that time. The group maintained itself as a single unit until 1912 when it became necessary to split in into two divisions, eventually three. Matriculating to several colleges, Alex Siegel, Milt Goodfriend, and Max Coyne entered the City College of New York, becoming the Alpha class, initiating themselves under the new name of Tau Delta Phi on July 16, 1914. That same year, Gus Schieb and Leo Epstein created the Beta class at the New York School of Dentistry. Maxime Klaye, Samuel Klaye, Ben Gray, and Mac Goldman created the Gamma class at New York University's School of Commerce. These "classes" became the first chapters as the founders moved into the collegiate phase of their lives.

The founders are Phi Sigma Beta are:

- Alexander B. Siegel
- Milton J. Goodfriend
- Maximilian A. Coyne
- Gustave Schieb
- Leo Epstein
- Maxime Klaye
- Samuel Klaye
- Benjamin Gray
- Maxwell S. Goldman

Soon to follow was a string of new chapters formed, beginning with the Delta chapter at Columbia University in 1916. While the initial focus was on the New York metropolitan area, by 1917 interest from men outside of the area sparked the move to become a national organization, with the establishment of Epsilon chapter at Boston University. The decade saw a steady increase in membership. The "Pyramid" grew and expansion took its course from a regional to a national level.

By 1933 the fraternity had grown to nineteen chapters. In 1934, Tau Delta Phi absorbed several chapters from Omicron Alpha Tau, a smaller Jewish fraternity with similar ideals, also active primarily in the Northeast. These included chapters at Rutgers, NYU, and Cornell.

=== Recent history ===
The fraternity notes several "firsts": While formed to provide a fraternal experience for Jewish men, Tau Delta Phi became the first NIC fraternity to integrate by welcoming all races, creeds, ethnicities, and religions (1945), and was the first to open membership to include transgender, gender fluid, and non-binary members (February 2021).

Ironically, the integration that Tau Delta Phi pioneered may have been a factor in chapter loss during the 1960's through 1990's. That period showed a marked contraction of chapters coinciding with the period's adoption of integration by virtually all if not all, other national fraternities. (Note: Many Jewish themed national fraternities and sororities formed in the first half of the 20th Century but consolidated or closed in the decades after WWII. Why? The Sanua reference, "Going Greek," provides an extensive discussion of this trend. In the modern era, some have maintained a Jewish identity, while others note their Jewish heritage but do not specifically target Jewish students for recruitment. Others have adopted an even more general, interfaith, or secular model. The Talk page for the List of Jewish Fraternities and Sororities has a further summary.)

Tau Delta Phi hired an executive director for the first time in decades, in 2012. Since that time staff and volunteers have spearheaded several expansion projects, aimed to rebuild the fraternity.

== Fraternity structure ==
The grand chapter of Tau Delta Phi Fraternity is the highest power. It convenes at every national convention and governs every aspect of the fraternity. It is composed of the executive council members, two delegates from each chartered chapter, the past living grand consuls, and one delegate from every alumni chapter in good standing.

Each chapter has a Chapter House Corporation to evaluate the property needs of each chapter and try to either rent, lease or purchase a chapter house for each chapter. Each House Corporation has its board of directors which are usually composed of fraters from their respective chapters.

The Tau Delta Phi Foundation is the nonprofit arm of the fraternity which seeks to support the educational mission of Tau Delta Phi and offer scholarships and grants to fraters of the fraternity.

=== The executive council ===
The executive council is the board of directors of the fraternity. in between conventions, the Executive Council governs the fraternity. It is composed of all the grand officers and members of the board. The Tau Delta Phi Management Company is a for-profit arm of the fraternity. It manages the finances of and provides support services to each House Corporation and issues a service contract for those services.

The executive council of Tau Delta Phi is the supreme legislative authority between conventions. The board is composed of all the grand officers and the members of the board. The executive council is responsible for governing the fraternity and developing strategic plans to meet educational and brotherhood outcomes.

=== The national office ===
In 2012, the executive council hired its first full-time professional executive director in three decades. In 2014, the national office hired a graduate assistant and chapter consultant, who can visit chapters and colonies, and provide support for educational programs. The national office is host to the annual leadership conference, The Pyramid Leadership Institute.

== Notable members ==
- Len Berman, sportscaster, NBC
- Colonel Bernard Bernstein, U.S. Army financial adviser to Dwight Eisenhower
- Dave Calloway, basketball player
- Gilbert Cates, producer/director
- Sammy Davis Jr., entertainer
- Kinky Friedman, musician, humorist, novelist, politician (expelled)
- Donald P. Greenberg, the Jacob Gould Schurman Professor of Computer Graphics at Cornell University
- Edward Hurwitz, diplomat
- Daniel James III, Lt.Gen.U.S. Air Force, Director of Air National Guard-Pentagon
- Floyd Little, Pro Football Hall of Fame inductee
- Ed Orgeron, college football coach
- Irv Kupcinet, TV host and Newspaper columnist
- Irving Rapper, director
- Geraldo Rivera, broadcast journalist
- Tony Roberts, Broadway and movie actor.
- David Sarnoff, first general manager of Radio Corporation of America, Founder of NBC
- Stellan Skarsgård, actor, director
- Jerry Stiller, actor/comedian
- Ira Wolfert, war correspondent

== See also ==
- List of social fraternities
- List of Jewish fraternities and sororities
