= Pi Lambda Phi =

International collegiate fraternity

- ΠΛΦ
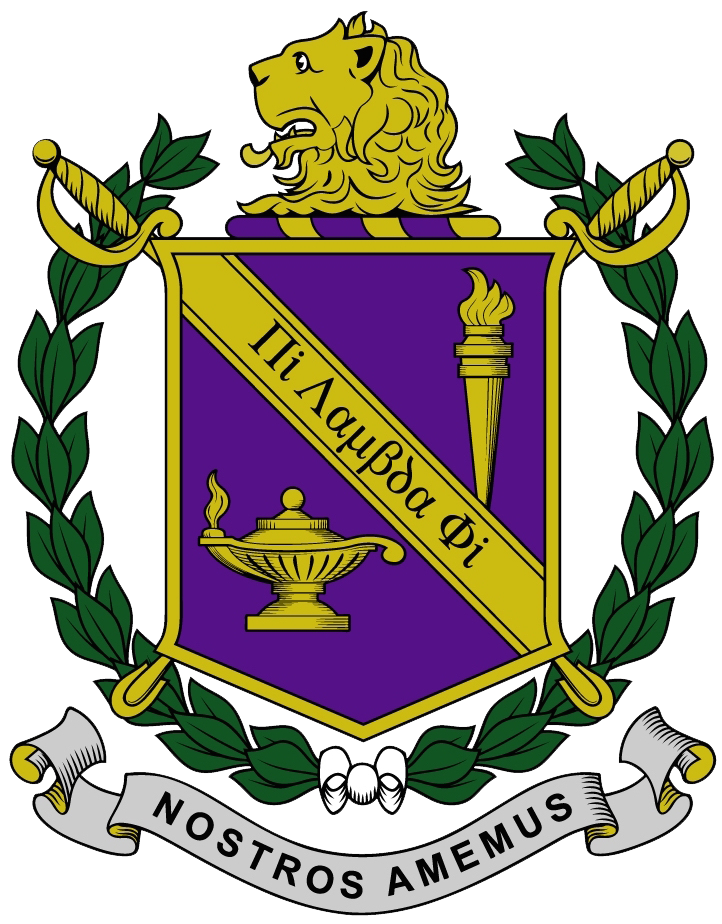
- Founded: March 21, 1895; 131 years ago Yale University
- Type: Social
- Affiliation: NIC
- Status: Active
- Scope: International
- Motto: Nostros Amemus "Not Four Years But a Lifetime"
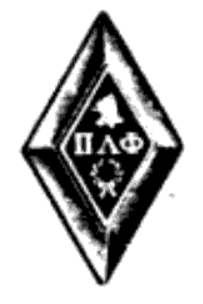
- Member badge
- Colors: Purple and Gold
- Flag
- Flower: Woodbine
- Philanthropy: The elimination of prejudice
- Chapters: 44 active
- Headquarters: 60 Newtown Road, #118; Danbury, Connecticut 06810; United States
- Website: pilambdaphi.org

Pi Lambda Phi (ΠΛΦ), commonly known as Pilam, is a social fraternity with 145 chapters (44 active chapters/colonies). The fraternity was founded in 1895 at Yale University in New Haven, Connecticut.

== History ==
Very little is known about the early foundings of the fraternity. After groups of men were denied admission to other fraternities at Yale University because of their religious and racial backgrounds in 1895, Frederick Manfred Werner, Louis Samter Levy, and Henry Mark Fisher were determined to start something new. They decided to start the first fraternity that was "a fraternity in which all men were brothers, no matter what their religion; a fraternity in which ability, open-mindedness, farsightedness, and a progressive, forward-looking attitude would be recognized as the basic attributes." Chapters at other universities started soon after. While non-sectarian, it was predominantly Jewish until the end of World War II. During its history, three national fraternities merged with Pi Lambda Phi: Phi Beta Delta, Beta Sigma Tau and Beta Sigma Rho.

== Merging fraternities ==
=== Phi Beta Delta ===
Phi Beta Delta was founded at Columbia University, April 4, 1912. The Founders stated, "Its purpose is to inculcate among its membership a fine spirit of loyalty, activity and scholarship toward their Alma Mater, to develop the highest ideals of conduct and to promote a close fraternal bond through means of carefully selected associates." Phi Beta Delta merged into Pi Lambda Phi on February 1, 1941. At the time, Pi Lambda Phi had 20 active chapters and Phi Beta Delta had 16, considering duplications, the combined Pi Lambda Phi fraternity was a net of 33 chapters. It was at this time that Pi Lambda Phi chapters were prefixed by a state designation to distinguish duplicate Greek letter names. All members and alumni of Phi Beta Delta were admitted into Pi Lambda Phi.

The founders of Phi Beta Delta were David H. Cohen, Henry C. Fenton, William Haas, Darcy M. Heinemann, Joseph Michtom, Samuel Null, Julius Rudd, and Bernard Shapiro. All of them were students at Columbia University.

=== Beta Sigma Tau ===
Beta Sigma Tau was founded in 1948 at Baldwin–Wallace College, which was later renamed Baldwin Wallace University. The Founders stated that the purpose of the fraternity was "to end barriers among people and to have a foundation based upon a brotherhood and democracy which transcends racial, national and religious differences." Beta Sigma Tau was merged into Pi Lambda Phi November 1, 1960. At the time of the merger there were 8 active chapters of Beta Sigma Tau. The Baldwin–Wallace College (OH Beta Tau) chapter is the sole surviving chapter of Beta Sigma Tau. The founder of Beta Sigma Tau was Stanley Tolliver of Baldwin–Wallace College (1947).

The University of Toledo also recognized a local chapter called Beta Sigma Tau from 1996–2005, without legal or institutional connection to the national fraternity, but which nevertheless professed to continue its "ideal of transcending racial, national, and religious differences."

=== Beta Sigma Rho ===
Beta Sigma Rho was founded at Cornell University on October 12, 1910. Beta Sigma Rho was organized under the name Beta Samach, the Greek letter Beta and the Hebrew letter Samach suggesting the application of the Greek society idea to the social and cultural life of the Jewish undergraduate student.

In 1950 the Beta Sigma Rho ritual was changed to reflect a non-sectarian viewpoint.

Beta Sigma Rho merged into Pi Lambda Phi on December 12, 1972, adding 5 active chapters, and merging 2 chapters. The existing two chapters at the Pennsylvania State University would not merge, thus at that school Beta Sigma Rho's Beta chapter became local, Beta Sigma Beta. The merger agreement stipulated "Each Honorary Fellow, Associate Fellow and Alumni Fellow of Beta Sigma Rho will become an accredited member of Pi Lambda Phi."

== Elimination of Prejudice ==
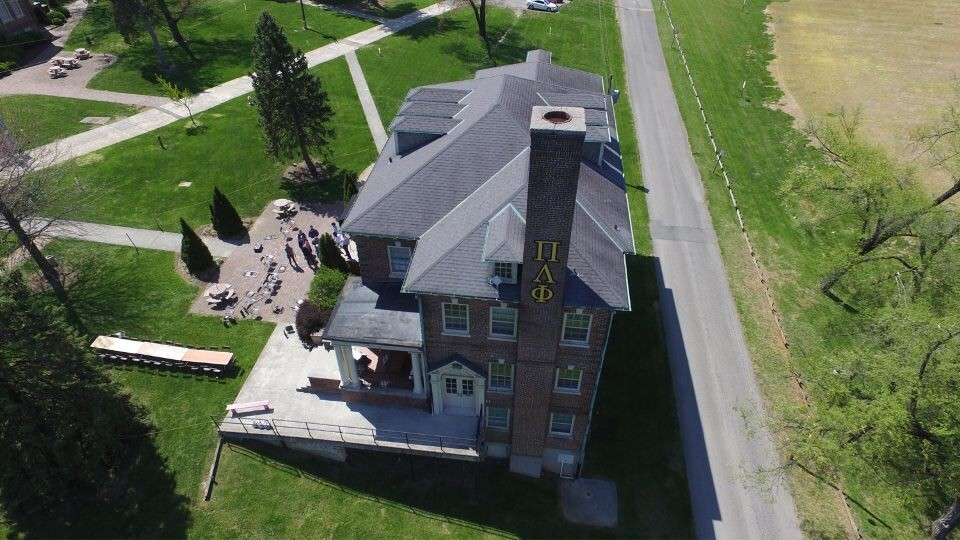
The Pi Lambda Phi house at Roanoke College's Virginia Lambda Kappa Chapter

The Elimination of Prejudice is the fraternity's official philanthropy. The non-profit organization was founded in 1996, and is headquartered in Berea, Ohio. The Elimination of Prejudice works to set the conditions for sensitive societal conversations to take place, and promotes the principles of equality and inclusiveness to the widest possible audience. It holds video and essay contests, and runs youth-based educational programs and retreats. The Elimination of Prejudice raises money to fund the aforementioned programs and others. Presently, the Elimination of Prejudice is active on 31 college campuses and universities, and works with nearly 1,000 students in the U.S. and Canada.

== Scholarship and membership development ==
In 1938, The Pi Lambda Phi Fraternity Foundation was founded to provide educational scholarships for the brothers of the fraternity and it was reestablished again in 1991 as the Pi Lambda Phi Educational Foundation, Inc." The foundation is the fraternity's charitable arm. In addition to providing scholarship and educational programs, the foundation provides recognition of humanitarian work for individuals outside of the fraternity through its sponsorship of the Pi Lambda Phi Humanitarian Award.

=== Pi Lambda Phi University ===
Pi Lambda Phi University is an online fraternity educational program hosted by the International Headquarters Staff.

== See also ==
- List of social fraternities and sororities
- List of Jewish fraternities and sororities
- Beta Sigma Rho
- Beta Sigma Tau
- Phi Beta Delta
